= Rochfort family =

Family

The Rochfort family came to Ireland (possibly from France) in the thirteenth century and acquired substantial lands in counties Kildare, Meath and Westmeath. Several members of the family were prominent lawyers and politicians. They gained the title Earl of Belvedere, and gave their name to the village of Rochfortbridge. The main Rochfort line ended with the death of the 2nd Earl of Belvedere in 1814.

== History ==
While the name is clearly French, the family's precise origins are a matter of conjecture. They had settled in Ireland by 1243, when Sir Richard de Rochfort and Sir John de Rochfort were the lords of Crom and Adare. Sir John was still alive in 1269. In 1300 Henry de Rochfort surrendered three manors in Kildare to the Crown. In about 1316 his widow Isabel, who had held Rathcoffey, Kildare as her dower lands, died: Rathcoffey reverted to the Crown, which granted it to John Wogan, lately Justiciar of Ireland. Sir Maurice Rochfort was Lord Justice of Ireland in 1302. Another Sir John Rochfort, who held his lands as a tenant-in-chief from the Crown, died in 1359, in which year the Privy Council of Ireland ordered that his widow Joanna be paid "a reasonable dower".

The main Rochfort line descends from Sir Milo de Rochfort, who was living in 1309. His great-grandson John was Lord of Tristledelan in about 1415 John settled at Kilbryde, which was the principal family seat for centuries. He and his wife Elizabeth had already received a royal pardon in 1407 for "intruding" in Kilbryde, i.e. trying to hold it before their rights to it were established. John's son Thomas had two sons, Robert and Roger: Robert inherited the main family estates including Kilbryde, while Roger was the father of the distinguished judge and cleric Thomas Rochfort (died 1522) Master of the Rolls in Ireland and Dean of St. Patrick's Cathedral, Dublin. Robert in the 1450s held the important office of attorney to Richard, Duke of York on his Irish estates.

Robert Rochfort of Kilbryde (1434–1489) married Genet Nangle, daughter of Thomas Nangle, Baron of Navan and had issue, a son Christopher, (b. 1462 in Kileen, County Meath). Christopher married Margaret Eustace (b. 1466) and had issue one son, Robert (b. 1488) and a daughter, Genet, who married David Sutton of Castletown. Robert married firstly Jane St. Johns and had issue: Robert, his heir, and two daughters Elinor and Ismay. Elinor apparently lived all her life at Dunboyne; she never married. Ismay married the distinguished judge Sir John Elliott, Baron of the Court of Exchequer (Ireland), by whom she had four sons: Henry, Oliver, Thomas and Christopher. Their tomb can still be seen in the ruined church of Balsoon, County Meath, which they built.

The senior Robert married secondly Jane Boix, (b. 1490), daughter of James Boix, and had issue four children: 1. James, who married Margaret Lynum, 2. Walter, who married Joan Fitz Symons, 3. Katherine, who married Nicholas Dillon, and 4. Elizabeth (b. 1522 in Laragh, County Kildare, and married Robert Lutrell).

Walter Rochfort, (d. 1630) married Catherine Sarsfield and had issue: Alexander, Henry, James, and Nicholas. It is James Rochfort's first son, Captain James Rochfort, who died in the service of his majesty under Lord Dillon's Regiment of Foot at Kilshaughlin on 24 Feb 1641

During the English Civil War Prime Iron Rochfort of Clogrenane, County Cork, served under Sir Charles Coote's Regiment in 1641, and in 1642 he was a Captain of Foot, garrisoned in Naas with 100 other men. In 1647 he was a Lt. Col under Col. Long. It was around this time he was married to Thomasine Pigott Hull, daughter of Sir Robert Pigott and widow of Argentine Hull of Leamcon, Co. Cork, who died in 1637. Widow Hull had two children, Charles (b. 1636) and Mary (b. 1638) who was probably born posthumously. "TCD, 1641 Depositions Project, online transcript January 1970

Lt. Col Prime Iron Rochfort was court-martialed for the death of Major Turner, a fellow army officer, on 9 March 1652. The trial of Lt.Col.Rochfort indicates that Major Turner was bludgeoned to the head, without malice or intent to kill, but later died of his wounds. There is no detail in the court transcript to indicate what precipitated the incident. "I. Gentles, H. Maclean & M.

Prime Iron Rochfort's son Robert Rochfort (1652-1727) was born 9 months to the day of his father's court-martial, and having been "bred to the law", had a highly distinguished career, being Speaker of the Irish House of Commons and Chief Baron of the Irish Exchequer. Robert's grandson, also named Robert, was created 1st Earl of Belvedere in 1756. Their principal residences were Gaulstown House and, later, Belvedere House in Westmeath, of which only the latter still exists.

== Notable family members ==
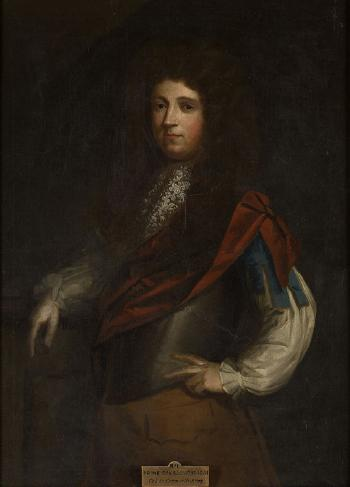
James Rochfort, nicknames "Prime Iron"

- Thomas Rochfort, Master of the Rolls in Ireland and Dean of St. Patrick's Cathedral, Dublin
- James Rochfort, generally known by his nickname "Prime Iron", Cromwellian army officer, executed for murder
- Robert Rochfort, son of Prime Iron, Speaker of the Irish House of Commons and Chief Baron of the Exchequer of Ireland
- John Rochfort, MP for Ballyshannon and Mullingar, son of the above Robert
- George Rochfort, Chief Baron of the Exchequer, son of the above Robert, father of Robert, below:
- Robert Rochfort, 1st Earl of Belvedere
- Arthur Rochfort, Westmeath MP
- George Rochfort, 2nd Earl of Belvedere
- George Rochfort, brother to the above 1st Earl of Belvedere and Arthur, builder of Tudenham Park House, father of the below:
- Gustavus Hume Rochfort, Westmeath MP, Lord Lieutenant of Westmeath.
- George Augustus Boyd-Rochfort, High Sheriff of Westmeath
- George Boyd-Rochfort, Irish Victoria Cross recipient.
- Horace William Noel Rochfort, High Sheriff of Carlow and of Queen's County
- Alexander Rochfort, Lieutenant Governor of Jersey, son of the above Horace

== Places associated with the Rochfort family ==
- Belvedere House, near Mullingar
- Clogrennane Castle, County Carlow
- Bloomfield House Hotel, near Mullingar
- Gaulstown House, County Westmeath
- Tudenham Park House, County Westmeath
- The Jealous Wall, Mullingar
- Kilbryde, County Meath
- Killadoon, Celbridge, County Kildare
- Rathcoffey Castle, County Kildare
- Rochfortbridge, County Westmeath
