= John Rochfort (politician) =

John Rochfort (c. 1690 – 30 January 1771) was a member of the pre-1801 Parliament of Ireland, in the Irish House of Commons.

== Early life ==
Rochfort was born in c. 1690 into the Rochfort family. He was the second son of Hannah Hannock (a daughter of William Hannock) and Robert Rochfort, who served as Attorney General for Ireland, Chief Baron of the Irish Exchequer, and Speaker of the Irish House of Commons. His elder brother, George Rochfort, was MP for County Westmeath, and married Lady Elizabeth Moore (a daughter of the 3rd Earl of Drogheda), and had eleven children, including Robert Rochfort, 1st Earl of Belvedere and Arthur Rochfort.

== Career ==
Rochfort served in the Irish Parliament for Ballyshannon, County Donegal from 1713 to 1714 and from 1715 to 1727 and for Mullingar, County Westmeath from 1727 to 1760.

His estate included the lands of Newpark in Dublin, estates in County Westmeath and County Wexford. His primary estate was Clogrennane in County Carlow, which included the lands of Raheendoran, the ruins of Clogrennane Castle, and his seat, Clogrennane Lodge. When in Dublin, they had a residence on Jervis Street and another on Ormond Quay. In Carlow, they had a residence on Dublin Street.

== Personal life ==
On 19 June 1722, he married Deborah Staunton (c. 1695–1737), a daughter of Thomas Staunton. They lived in Clogrennane, County Carlow, and Newpark, County Dublin, and, together, were the parents of:

- Robert Rochfort (d. 1755), who graduated from Trinity College, Dublin, in 1744; he died unmarried.
- John Rochfort (1735–1812), who married Dorothea Burgh, daughter of Thomas Burgh, MP for Lanesborough and Anne Downes; her brother was Thomas Burgh.
- Deborah Rochfort (b. c. 1733), who married George Bishop of Bishop's Hall, County Kilkenny, in 1754. After his death, she married her cousin, Capt. Philip Rochfort, son of Arthur Rochfort, MP for Westmeath, in 1770.
- Mary Rochfort (d. 1791), who married Thomas Maunsell of Plassey, MP for Kilmallock, (Note: Thomas Maunsell (c. 1726-c. 1814) was a son of Thomas Maunsell. Thomas and his brother Robert were co-founders of Maunsell's Bank in Limerick. One of their junior partners was Sir Matthew Blakiston, 2nd Baronet, the wife of Mary's niece Anne.)

After his first wife's death in 1737, he married Emilia (née Eyre) Wilson (c. 1709–c. 1770), a daughter of John Eyre, MP for Galway Town, of Galway and widow of Rev. William Wilson of Shingles, County Westmeath, on 24 May 1746.

Rochfort died on 30 January 1771 and was succeeded in his estates by his only surviving son John. John added to the estate by leasing estates at Clonskee in County Galway and purchasing additional lands of Adamstown and Milltown, Dublin.

=== Descendants ===
Through his son John, he was grandfather to Anne Rochfort (c. 1762–1862), who married Sir Matthew Blakiston, 2nd Baronet (heir of Sir Matthew Blakiston, 1st Baronet); and John Staunton Rochfort (1763–1844), who married Harriette Mann, a daughter of Sir Horatio Mann, 2nd Baronet and Lady Lucy Noel (a daughter of the 4th Earl of Gainsborough) and Mary Burgh, a daughter of Thomas Burgh, MP; and the Rev. Robert Rochfort (1775–1811), the notorious "Slashing Parson" of 1798.
