= Robert Rochfort (disambiguation) =

Robert Rochfort may refer to:

- Robert Rochfort (1652–1727), Anglo-Irish lawyer, politician and judge
- Robert Rochfort, 1st Earl of Belvedere (1708–1774), Anglo-Irish politician and peer
- Robert Rochfort (1743–1797), Anglo-Irish politician
