= Gilliard =

Gilliard is a surname. Notable people with the surname include:

- Carl Gilliard (born 1958), American actor, director, and producer
- Clifton Gilliard (1938–2017), American football player, coach, and college athletics administrator
- Ernest Thomas Gilliard (1912–1965), American ornithologist
- Lawrence Gilliard Jr., African-American character actor
- Nicolas Gilliard (born 1947), Swiss swimmer who competed at the 1968 Summer Olympics
- Pierre Gilliard (1879–1962), Swiss citizen and French tutor for the five children of Tsar Nicholas II from 1905 to 1918
- Alexandra Tegleva Gilliard (1894–1955), Russian nursemaid for the five children of Tsar Nicholas II, wife of Pierre Gilliard
- Seth Gilliard (born 1989 or 1990), South Carolina violinist who covers pop tunes
- Steve Gilliard, (1964–2007), American liberal journalist and blogger
- Wendell Gilliard (born 1954), American politician, steelworker, and union official
- Edward “Figgy Fig” Gilliard, African American Sports Talk Media Personality for Sportsradio 610 KILT-AM in Houston, Texas

== See also ==
- Gillard (disambiguation)
- Gilliard's bird of paradise, named after Ernest Thomas Gilliard
- Gilliard's flying fox, a mammal
- Gilliard's honeyeater, a species of bird described by Ernest Thomas Gilliard
