= Richard Nugent, Lord Delvin =

Richard Nugent, Lord Delvin (1742 – 6 August 1761) was an Irish duellist and Member of Parliament.

Nugent was the eldest son and heir of Thomas Nugent, 6th Earl of Westmeath and adopted the courtesy title of Lord Delvin in 1754 when his father acceded to the earldom.

In 1759, he was elected Member of Parliament for Fore, although he was underage. He was also commissioned a cornet in the 1st Regiment of Dragoons.

In July 1761 aged only 19, the drunken Lord Delvin accosted a female acquaintance of Captain George Reilly, and was challenged to a duel. The two crossed swords in the music room at Marlborough Bowling Green close to the site of present day Tyrone House, and Delvin was mortally wounded. The incident led to the abandonment of Marlborough Bowling Green as a fashionable resort.

Parliament of Ireland
Preceded by Robert Perceval; Richard Malone	Member of Parliament for Fore; 1759–1761; With: Robert Perceval	Succeeded by Godfrey Lill; John Newenham
