= William Handcock (1704–1741) =

Irish politician

William Handcock (1704 – 13 August 1741) was an Irish politician.

He was the oldest son of William Handcock and his wife Susan Warburton, daughter of Richard Warburton. His younger brother was John Gustavus Handcock and his cousins were William Handcock, 1st Viscount Castlemaine and Richard Handcock, 2nd Baron Castlemaine. In 1727, Handcock entered the Irish House of Commons and represented Fore until his death in 1741.

He married Elizabeth Vesey, second daughter of Sir Thomas Vesey, 1st Baronet and sister of John Vesey, 1st Baron Knapton. Their marriage was childless.

Parliament of Ireland
Preceded by Robert Perceval; Walter Nugent	Member of Parliament for Fore; 1727–1741; With: Robert Perceval	Succeeded by Robert Perceval; Richard Malone
