= Gillard (disambiguation) =

Julia Gillard (born 1961) is an Australian former politician and lawyer who served as the Prime Minister of Australia from 2010−2013.

Gillard may also refer to:

== People ==
- Brett Gillard (born 1970), Australian rugby league footballer
- Doug Gillard (born 1965), American guitarist
- Frank Gillard (1909–1998), British radio broadcaster and administrator
- Ian Gillard (born 1950), English footballer
- Linda Gillard, British writer
- Nick Gillard (born 1955), film stunt performer
- Reg Gillard (1920−2001), Australian politician
- Stuart Gillard (born 1950), Canadian film director
- William Gillard (1812–1897), British painter

== Other uses ==
- Gillard (kart manufacturer), British kart manufacturer

== See also ==
- Franck Gilard (born 1950), French politician
- Gilliard (disambiguation)
