= John Handcock (Philipstown MP) =

Irish politician (1755–1786)

John Handcock (1755 – October 1786) was an Irish politician and soldier.

He was a descendant of Eliah Handcock, second son of Thomas Handcock and his wife Doroth Green. Handcock was a captain in the artillery and major of Charles Fort. He served later as lieutenant-governor of Kinsale. In 1776, he entered the Irish House of Commons.

Parliament of Ireland
Preceded by Duke Tyrrell; Richard Rochfort-Mervyn	Member of Parliament for Philipstown; 1776–1783; With: Hugh Carleton	Succeeded by John Toler; Henry Cope
