= Richard Malone =

Richard Malone may refer to:

- Richard Joseph Malone (born 1946), American former Catholic Bishop of Buffalo
- Richard Malone, 1st Baron Sunderlin (died 1816), Anglo-Irish politician and peer
- Richard Malone (Irish MP), Irish barrister and politician
- Richard Brent Malone (1941–2004), Bahamian photorealist painter
- Richard Malone (designer), Irish artist and designer
- Dick Malone, Scottish footballer
