= John Rochfort =

John Rochfort may refer to:

- John Rochfort (surveyor)
- John Rochfort (politician)
