= Anthony Malone =

18th-century Irish lawyer and politician

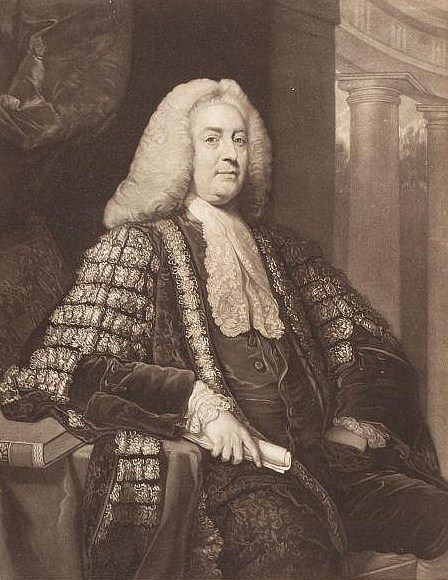

Member of the Irish House of Commons
- In office 1727 – 8 May 1776
- Preceded by: Richard Levinge
- Succeeded by: Benjamin Chapman
- Constituency: County Westmeath (1727-1761); Castlemartyr; (1761-1768); County Westmeath (1768-1776)

Personal details
- Born: 5 December 1700
- Died: 8 May 1776 (aged 58)

Anthony Malone (5 December 1700 – 8 May 1776) was an Irish lawyer and politician.

== Life ==
The eldest son of Richard Malone of Baronston (or Baronstown) House, Ballynacarrigy, County Westmeath, who was a barrister like his three eldest sons, and Marcella, daughter of Redmond Molady of Robertstown, County Kildare and his wife Mary, a Malone cousin, he was born on 5 December 1700; the noted Shakespearean scholar Edmond Malone was his nephew, son of Edmond Malone senior, and a younger brother, Richard Malone (1706–1759) was MP for Fore from 1741 to his death. All three brothers held the office of Serjeant-at-law, but only Edmond was appointed a High Court judge, sitting in the Court of Common Pleas (Ireland). Anthony was educated at Mr. Young's school in Abbey Street, Dublin, and on 6 April 1720 was admitted a gentleman-commoner of Christ Church, Oxford. After two years at university, he entered the Middle Temple, and was called to the Irish Bar in May 1726. In 1737, he was created LL.D. of Trinity College Dublin.

Malone made a successful career as a lawyer (his father had been considered the finest barrister of his time). From 1727 to 1760, and again from 1769 to 1776, he represented the County Westmeath, and from 1761 to 1768 Castlemartyr, in the Irish parliament. In 1740, he was appointed Serjeant-at-law, but was dismissed from office in 1754 for opposing the claim of the Crown to dispose of unappropriated revenue. The decision aroused much public indignation, as he was extremely popular, and there were public demonstrations in his favour. In 1757, he was made chancellor of the exchequer, but his attitude in council in regard to the Money Bill of 1761 led to him again being removed from office. His treatment was regarded as too severe by William Pitt; and Malone, who drew a distinction between advice offered in council and his conduct in parliament, introduced the measure as chairman of the committee of supply. He was shortly afterwards granted a patent of precedence at the bar, but was charged with having sold his political principles for money. In the 1750s, he was a partner in a short-lived banking firm, which collapsed during the financial crisis towards the end of the decade, leaving him for a time in some financial difficulty.

Malone supported John Monck Mason's bill for enabling Roman Catholics to invest money in mortgages on land. His tolerance in religious matters sometimes led to accusations that he was a Catholic himself; a suspicion strengthened by the fact that his mother had been raised in that faith, and that earlier generations of Malones had also been Catholics. In 1762 he was appointed, with Sir Richard Aston, to try the Whiteboys of Munster; they agreed in ascribing the rural violence to local and individual grievances.

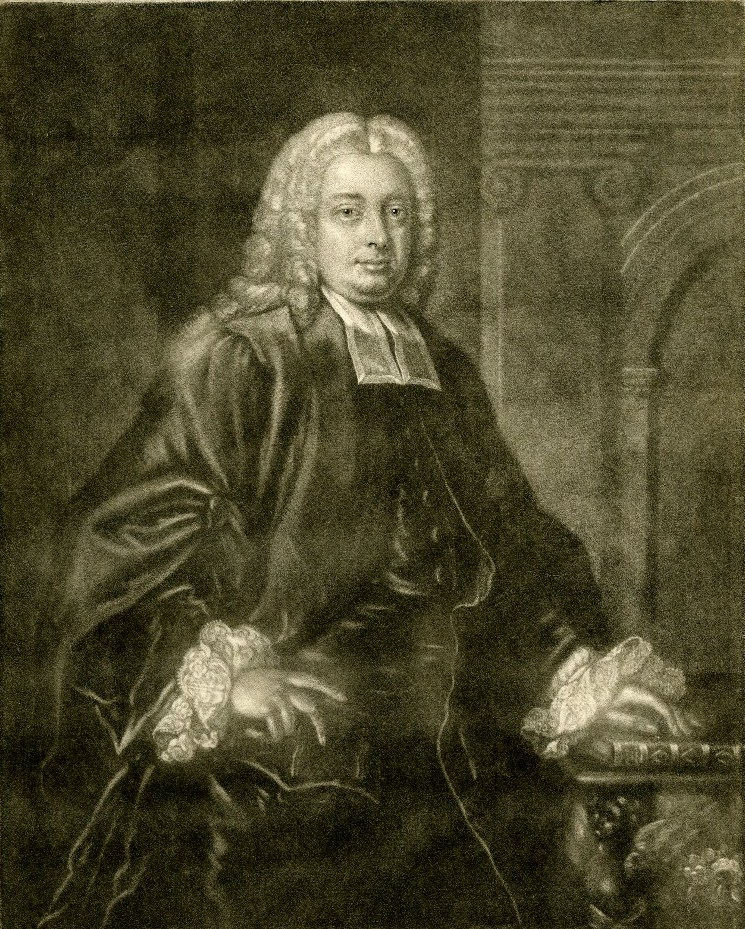
Anthony Malone, engraving by Charles Spooner

Malone died on 8 May 1776. A marble bust of him used to adorn Baronston House.

== Family ==
Malone married in 1733 Rose, daughter of Sir Ralph Gore, 4th Baronet, Speaker of the Irish House of Commons and his first wife Elizabeth Colville, daughter of Sir Robert Colville; they had no children. By his will, made in July 1774, he left all his estates in the counties of Westmeath, Roscommon, Longford, Cavan, and Dublin to his nephew, Richard Malone, 1st Baron Sunderlin as he became, eldest son of his brother Edmund. On his death without issue in 1816, and his brother Edmund junior also having died without heirs, the right of succession to the family estates was disputed, due it was said to Anthony's will being so badly drafted.

== Notes ==
Attribution

This article incorporates text from a publication now in the public domain: Lee, Sidney, ed. (1893). "Malone, Anthony". Dictionary of National Biography. Vol. 35. London: Smith, Elder & Co.

Parliament of Ireland
Preceded by John Wood; Richard Levinge	Member of Parliament for County Westmeath; 1727–1761; With: George Rochfort 1727–1731; Robert Rochfort 1731–1738; Arthur Rochfort 1738–1761	Succeeded by George Rochfort, Viscount Belfield; Richard Rochfort
Preceded by John Lysaght; Michael O'Brien Dilkes	Member of Parliament for Castlemartyr; 1761–1768; With: John Magill	Succeeded by Sir John Colthurst, 1st Bt; Attiwell Wood
Preceded by George Rochfort, Viscount Belfield; Richard Rochfort	Member of Parliament for County Westmeath; 1768–1776; With: George Rochfort, Viscount Belfield	Succeeded by Robert Rochfort; Benjamin Chapman
