= Gustavus Hume Rochfort =

Anglo-Irish politician (died 1824)

Gustavus Hume Rochfort (c. 1750 – 30 January 1824) was an Anglo-Irish politician.

Rochfort was the son of George Rochfort and Alice, daughter of Sir Gustavus Hume, 3rd Baronet. His father was the son of George Rochfort, and grandson of Robert Rochfort.

He was the High Sheriff of Westmeath in 1796 and the Member of Parliament for County Westmeath in the Irish House of Commons from 1798 until the Acts of Union 1800. He subsequently represented County Westmeath in the House of Commons of the United Kingdom between 1801 and his death in 1824 as a Tory. He was Lord Lieutenant of Westmeath from 1815 to 1824.

Rochfort married Frances Bloomfield in July 1779, with whom he had seven sons and five daughters.

Parliament of Ireland
Preceded by Robert Rochfort; William Smyth	Member of Parliament for County Westmeath; 1798–1800; With: William Smyth	Constituency abolished
Parliament of the United Kingdom
New constituency	Member of Parliament for County Westmeath; 1801–1824; With: William Smyth (1801–1808); Hon. Hercules Robert Pakenham (1808–1824)	Succeeded by Hon. Hercules Robert Pakenham; Robert Smyth
