= Richard Rochfort-Mervyn =

British Army officer and politician

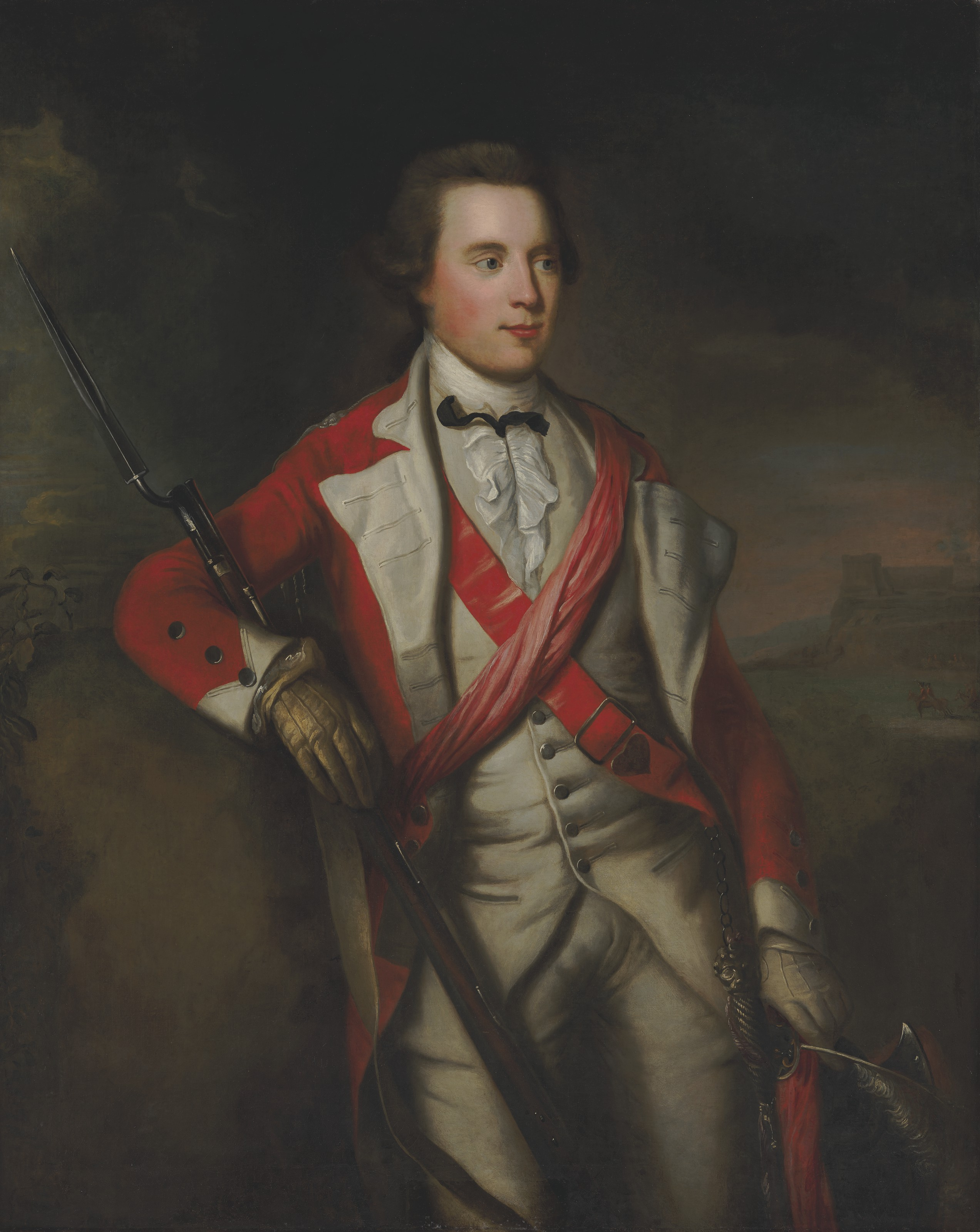
Portrait of Rochfort-Mervyn by Robert Hunter

Lieutenant-Colonel Richard Rochfort-Mervyn (12 December 1740 – 20 February 1776) was a British Army officer and politician.

== Biography ==
Rochfort-Mervyn was born Hon. Richard Rochfort, the second son of Robert Rochfort, 1st Earl of Belvedere and Hon. Mary Molesworth, daughter of Richard Molesworth, 3rd Viscount Molesworth. On 9 June 1764, he married Letitia, daughter of James Mervyn and Arabella Edwards, and assumed the surname of Mervyn.

He was an officer in the British Army and became a lieutenant colonel in the 35th Regiment of Foot. In 1761 he was elected to the Irish House of Commons as the Member of Parliament for County Westmeath. In 1768 he was elected for Philipstown. He represented the constituency until his death, without children, in 1776.

Parliament of Ireland
| Preceded by Arthur Rochfort; Anthony Malone | Member of Parliament for County Westmeath; 1761–1768; With: Viscount Belfield | Succeeded by Viscount Belfield; Anthony Malone |
| Preceded by Robert Rochford; Duke Tyrrell | Member of Parliament for Philipstown; 1768–1776; With: Robert Rochford (1768–1769); Duke Tyrrell (1769–1776) | Succeeded by John Handcock; Hugh Carleton |
