= Francis Knox =

Irish politician

Francis Knox (1754 – 12 April 1821) was a Member of Parliament (MP) for Philipstown from 1798 to 1800.

Parliament of Ireland
Preceded by John Longfield; William Sankey	Member of Parliament for Philipstown; 1798–1800; With: Robert Crowe	Succeeded by Robert Johnston; James Mahon
