= Gilliard's honeyeater =

Conservation status
- Near Threatened (IUCN 3.1)

Scientific classification
- Kingdom: Animalia
- Phylum: Chordata
- Class: Aves
- Order: Passeriformes
- Family: Meliphagidae
- Genus: Vosea; Gilliard, 1960
- Species: V. whitemanensis

Binomial name
- Vosea whitemanensis Gilliard, 1960

Synonyms
- Melidectes whitemanensis

Species of bird found in Papua New Guinea

Gilliard's honeyeater (Vosea whitemanensis) or the Bismarck honeyeater, is a bird species in the family Meliphagidae. It is the only species placed in the genus Vosea. It is endemic to New Britain. Its natural habitat is subtropical or tropical moist montane forests.

Gilliard's honeyeater was described by the American ornithologist Thomas Gilliard in 1960 from specimens collected in the Whiteman Mountains on the island of New Britain in the Bismarck Archipelago. Gilliard introduced the genus Vosea and coined the binomial name Vosea whitemanensis. The genus name Vosea was chosen to honour the memory of Charles R. Vose (1890–1957), an American businessman, explorer and sponsor. The specific epithet whitemanensis is from the type locality. The species was formerly placed in the genus Melidectes but was transferred to its own genus Vosea based on the results of a molecular phylogenetic study published in 2019. The species is monotypic: no subspecies are recognised.

Formerly classified as a species of least concern by the IUCN, it was suspected to be rarer than generally assumed. Following the evaluation of its population size, this was found to be correct, and it is consequently uplisted to near threatened status in 2008.
