= Arthur Rochfort =

Anglo-Irish politician

Arthur Rochfort (7 November 1711 – 22 April 1774) was an Anglo-Irish politician.

Rochfort was the son of Rt. Hon. George Rochfort (son of Robert Rochfort, Chief Baron of the Irish Exchequer), and Lady Elizabeth Moore, daughter of Henry Hamilton-Moore, 3rd Earl of Drogheda. Between 1738 and 1760 he was a Member of Parliament for County Westmeath in the Irish House of Commons.

He married Sara Singleton, daughter of Rev. Rowland Singleton of Drogheda, and the couple had a number of children, including Eliza Rochfort (1772 – 1861) who went onto marry George Hyde Clark of Hyde Hall, New York.

Parliament of Ireland
Preceded by Robert Rochfort; Anthony Malone	Member of Parliament for County Westmeath; 1738–1760; With: Anthony Malone	Succeeded by Viscount Belfield; Richard Rochfort-Mervyn
