= Marianne Trotter =

Irish artist (died 1777)

- Born: Marianne Hunter; 1752?
- Died: 1777 (aged 24–25)

Marianne or Mary Anne Trotter (1752?–1777) was an Irish artist and engraver.

== Life ==
Marianne Trotter was born Marianne Hunter possibly in 1752. She was the daughter of the prominent portrait painter, Robert Hunter. She married the portrait painter, John Trotter, in December 1774. The couple had two daughters who were also artists, Eliza H. and Mary.

Trotter's first recorded exhibited painting was a self portrait shown with the Society of Artists in 1765, when she was 13. It was described as "her first attempt in colours". The Dublin Society awarded her four premiums for her portraits and history paintings. It appears that she worked in partnership with her husband, working from their studios at Stafford Street Dublin, and later Jervis Street and Britain Street. She exhibited as Mrs Trotter in 1775 and 1777. She died in 1777.
