= Eliza H. Trotter =

Irish artist

- Born: before 1777; Dublin
- Known for: portrait and historical paintings

Eliza H. Trotter (fl. 1800–1815) was an Irish artist.

== Life ==
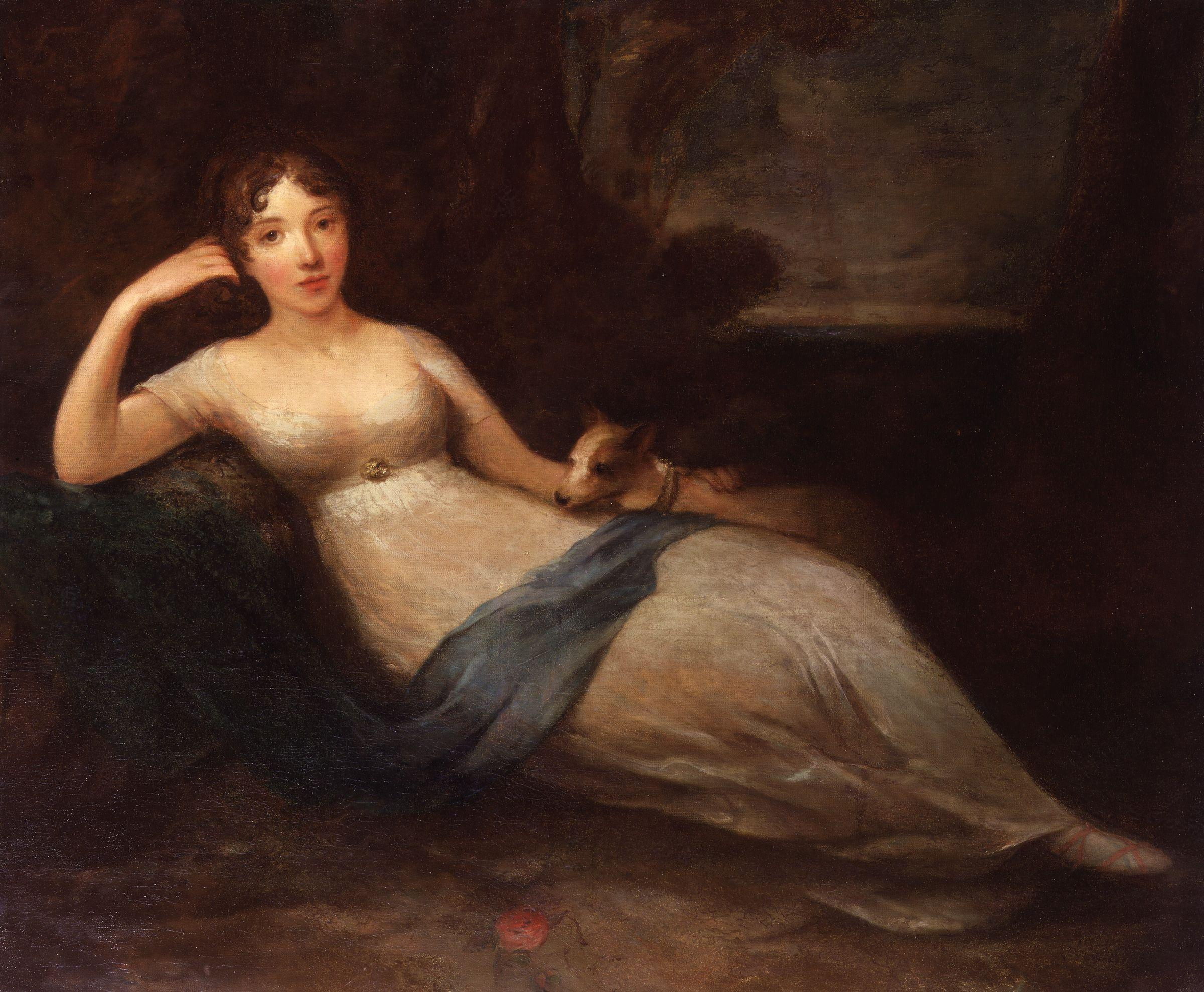
Lady Caroline Lamb by Eliza H. Trotter

Eliza H. Trotter was the younger daughter of artists Marianne Hunter and John Trotter. Her mother died in 1777. The first record of her exhibiting was in 1800 from 16 Strafford Street, Dublin. In 1802 she exhibited from Parliament House, and in 1804 she was living at 30 Cuffe Street.

In 1804 she decorated a house in Glasnevin which was gifted to Charles Lindsay, the Bishop of Kildare by the Harp Society of Dublin. Her portrait of Patrick Quin was engraved for use in the Monthly Pantheon by Henry Brocas. Brocas also created an engraving from Trotter's portrait of John Bernard Trotter, the secretary of the Harp Society. In 1809 she exhibited six portraits with the Dublin Society in Hawkins House. In 1811 she was in London and exhibited a Portrait of a Young Lady with the Royal Society, while studying at the Royal Academy Schools. From 1811 to 1814 she exhibited historical and subject paintings with the British Institution, from addresses in Westminster and Hammersmith. No more is known about her life after this point. One of her best known works is a portrait of Lady Caroline Lamb held in the National Portrait Gallery, London.
