= Fore (Parliament of Ireland constituency) =

Pre-1801 Irish constituency

- Former borough constituency for the Irish House of Commons
- County: County Westmeath
- Borough: Fore

1612–1801
- Replaced by: Disfranchised

Fore was a constituency in County Westmeath represented in the Irish House of Commons from 1612 to 1800.

== History ==
In the Patriot Parliament of 1689 summoned by James II, Fore was represented with two members.

== Members of Parliament ==
- 1634–1635: Lucas Fitzgerald and Thomas Nugent (died 1634 and replaced by John Nugent)
- 1639–1649: John Nugent (died 1647 and replaced by Oliver Walshe)
- 1661–1666: Sir Timothy Tyrrill of Buckinghamshire (absent/died and replaced 1662 by Charles Viscount Falkland. Falkland died and was replaced 1663 by John Forrest) and William Markham

=== 1689–1801 ===
| Election | First MP | Second MP |
|---|---|---|
| 1689 | John Nugent | Christopher Nugent |
| 1692 | John Adams | James Nugent |
| 1695 | Walter Pollard | Thomas Smith |
| 1713 | Viscount Tamworth | Denis Kelly |
| 1715 | William Smyth | Patrick Fox |
| November 1727 | Robert Perceval | Walter Nugent |
| December 1727 | Robert Perceval | William Handcock |
| 1741 | Robert Perceval | Richard Malone |
| 1759 | Robert Perceval | Lord Delvin |
| 1761 | Godfrey Lill | John Newenham |
| 1768 | Thomas Eyre | John Armstrong |
| 1772 | Benjamin Chapman | John Armstrong |
| 1776 | James FitzGerald | Cornelius O'Keefe |
| 1780 | James FitzGerald | Lord Delvin |
| 1783 | Gervase Parker Bushe | Lord Delvin |
| 1790 | Stephen Francis William Fremantle | Lord Delvin |
| 1792 | Stephen Francis William Fremantle | John Macartney |
| 1794 | Richard Magenis | John Macartney |
| January 1798 | Robert Ross (Note: Also elected for Old Newry in 1798, for which he chose to sit) | Hon. Richard Annesley (Note: Also elected for Blessington in 1798, for which he chose to sit) |
| March 1798 | Cromwell Price | Sir John Tydd, 1st Bt |
| 1798 | John Staunton Rochfort | Sir John Tydd, 1st Bt |
| 1800 | John Staunton Rochfort | Thomas Burgh |
| 1801 | Constituency disenfranchised | |

== Bibliography ==
- O'Hart, John (2007). The Irish and Anglo-Irish Landed Gentry: When Cromwell came to Ireland. Vol. II. Heritage Books. ISBN 978-0-7884-1927-0.
- Leigh Rayment's historical List of Members of the Irish House of Commons. Cites: Johnston-Liik, Edith Mary (2002). The History of the Irish Parliament 1692-1800 (6 volumes). Ulster Historical Foundation.
