= Philipstown (Parliament of Ireland constituency) =

Pre-1801 Irish constituency

- Former borough constituency for the Irish House of Commons
- County: King's County
- Borough: Philipstown (now Daingean)

–1801
- Seats: 2
- Replaced by: Disfranchised

Philipstown in King's County was a constituency represented in the Irish House of Commons until 1800. The town was later renamed Daingean in 1922.

== Members of Parliament ==
Election	First MP	Second MP	
1585	John Freman	Edward Williams	
1613	Colley Philips	Robert Leicester	
1634	Robert Leicester	Thomas Moore	
1639	John Moore	Simon Digby	
1661	Dudley Colley	Sir George Blundell	
1692	Peter Purefoy	Duke Giffard	
1695	Robert Peppard	Duke Giffard	
1698	John Lovett	Duke Giffard	
1703	George Monck	John Moore	
November 1713	John Forster	James Peppard	
1713	William Purefoy	James Peppard	
1715	William Tichborne	James Forth	
1717	William Molesworth	James Forth	
1727	William Molesworth	Robert Adair	
1737	William Molesworth	Boleyn Whitney	
1759	William Molesworth	Viscount Belfield	
May 1761	Robert Rochford	Viscount Belfield	
1761	Robert Rochford	Duke Tyrrell	
1768	Robert Rochford	Richard Rochfort-Mervyn	
1769	Duke Tyrrell	Richard Rochfort-Mervyn	
1776	John Handcock	Hugh Carleton	
1783	John Toler	Henry Cope	
1790	William Sankey	Arthur O'Connor	Patriot/Whig
1795	William Sankey	John Longfield	
1798	Francis Knox	Robert Crowe	
1800	Robert Johnson	James Mahon	
1801	Constituency disenfranchised		
