= William Handcock (Westmeath politician) =

English-born Irish politician (1631–1707)

William Handcock (c. 1631 – c. 1 July 1707) was an Irish politician.

== Life ==
Originally from Lancashire, son of Christopher Handcock and Mary Browne, Handcock entered the Irish House of Commons in 1661, holding his seat for County Westmeath until 1666. He was then appointed to the Council of the Lord President of Connaught and in 1680, he received a grant to erect a manor in Twyford, County Westmeath. Handcock represented Athlone in the Commons from 1692 until 1699 and sat in the following parliament again for Westmeath from 1703 until his death in 1707.

=== Personal life ===
On 25 July 1652, he married Abigail Stanley, daughter of Rev. Thomas Stanley, according to her memorial. They had eight children. His sons William and Thomas sat also in the Parliament of Ireland. Two other sons, Matthew and Stephen, were senior Church of Ireland clergymen. One of their daughters Hannah married the leading politician and judge Robert Rochfort: their descendants held the title Earl of Belvedere. Her sister Sarah married Captain Chichester Phillips of Drumcondra Castle, MP for Askeaton. A third daughter Elizabeth married Duke Gifford of Castlejordan, County Meath. Duke was the heir, of Sir Thomas Gifford, first and last of the Gifford baronets.

Parliament of Ireland
Preceded by Patriot Parliament	Member of Parliament for Athlone; 1692–1699; With: Arthur St George	Succeeded by William Jones; William Handcock
Preceded by George Peyton; Robert Rochfort	Member of Parliament for County Westmeath; 1703–1707; With: Robert Rochfort	Succeeded by George Rochfort; Robert Rochfort
