= Edmond Malone (judge) =

Irish barrister, politician and judge

Edmund Malone (1704–1774) was an Irish barrister, politician and judge. He was the second of three brothers who all rose to the top of the legal profession, as their father had before them. He was the father of the first and only Lord Sunderlin, and of Edmund Malone junior, the noted Shakespearean scholar.

He was born at Baronston (or Baronstown) House, Ballynacarrigy, County Westmeath, second son of Richard Malone and Marcella Molady, daughter of Redmond Molady of Robertstown, County Kildare, nephew and heir of Sir Patrick Molady. His father was a highly successful barrister who was held in high regard by the English Crown, having as a young man performed a number of diplomatic missions for King William III. The eldest son, Anthony Malone, was both a fine barrister and a leading figure in Government.

Edmund entered the Middle Temple in 1722 and was called to the English bar in 1730. He practised successfully in England for a number of years, but in time encountered serious difficulties in his profession, and with a wife and growing family to support, thought it best to return home. He settled once more in his native Westmeath, at an estate called Shinglas. He was called to the Irish bar in 1740 and built up a good practice. He became King's Counsel in 1745 and Second Serjeant-at-law (Ireland) on the death of his younger brother Richard Malone in 1759. Since Anthony had also been Serjeant this family "hat-trick" was unprecedented, and caused some unfavourable comment, especially as both the Malone parents came from families which were traditionally Roman Catholic, at a time when the Penal Laws preventing Roman Catholics from practising law, or any other profession, were quite strictly enforced.

He entered politics, sitting in the Irish House of Commons as MP for Askeaton 1753–61 and then for Granard 1761–7. In 1767, he was appointed a justice of the Court of Common Pleas (Ireland) and served on the Court until his death.

He married in 1736 Catherine Collier, daughter and heiress of Benjamin Collier of Ruckholt, Essex and his wife Catherine Knight, who was a close relative, probably an aunt, of the first Earl of Catherlough. They had two surviving sons, Edmund and Richard Malone, 1st Baron Sunderlin, and two daughters, Henrietta and Catherine. The elder Catherine, who had suffered from ill health for years, died in 1765. Since his elder brother Anthony had no issue, on his death in 1776, he left all the family estates to his nephew Richard, who however died childless in 1816.

== Sources ==
- Ball, F. Elrington The Judges in Ireland 1221-1921 London John Murray 1926
- Debrett's Peerage 3rd Edition London 1790
- Hart, A.R. History of the King's Serjeants at law in Ireland Dublin Four Courts Press 2000
