= Robert Rochfort (1743–1797) =

Anglo-Irish politician

Robert Molesworth Rochfort (12 December 1743 – 17 October 1797) was an Anglo-Irish politician.

Rochfort was the third son of Robert Rochfort, 1st Earl of Belvedere and Hon. Mary Molesworth, daughter of Richard Molesworth, 3rd Viscount Molesworth. In 1776 he was elected to the Irish House of Commons as a Member of Parliament for County Westmeath. He held the seat until his death in 1797.

Parliament of Ireland
Preceded by Viscount Belfield; Anthony Malone	Member of Parliament for County Westmeath; 1776–1797; With: Sir Benjamin Chapman, Bt (1776–1783); Richard Malone (1783–1784); William Smyth (1784–1797)	Succeeded by Gustavus Hume Rochfort; William Smyth
