= John Trotter (painter) =

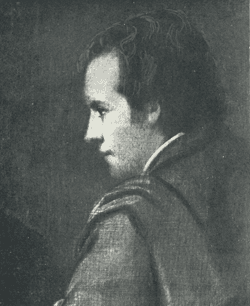
- Died: February 1792; Britain Street, Dublin

John Trotter (died 1792) was an Irish artist and portrait painter.

== Life ==
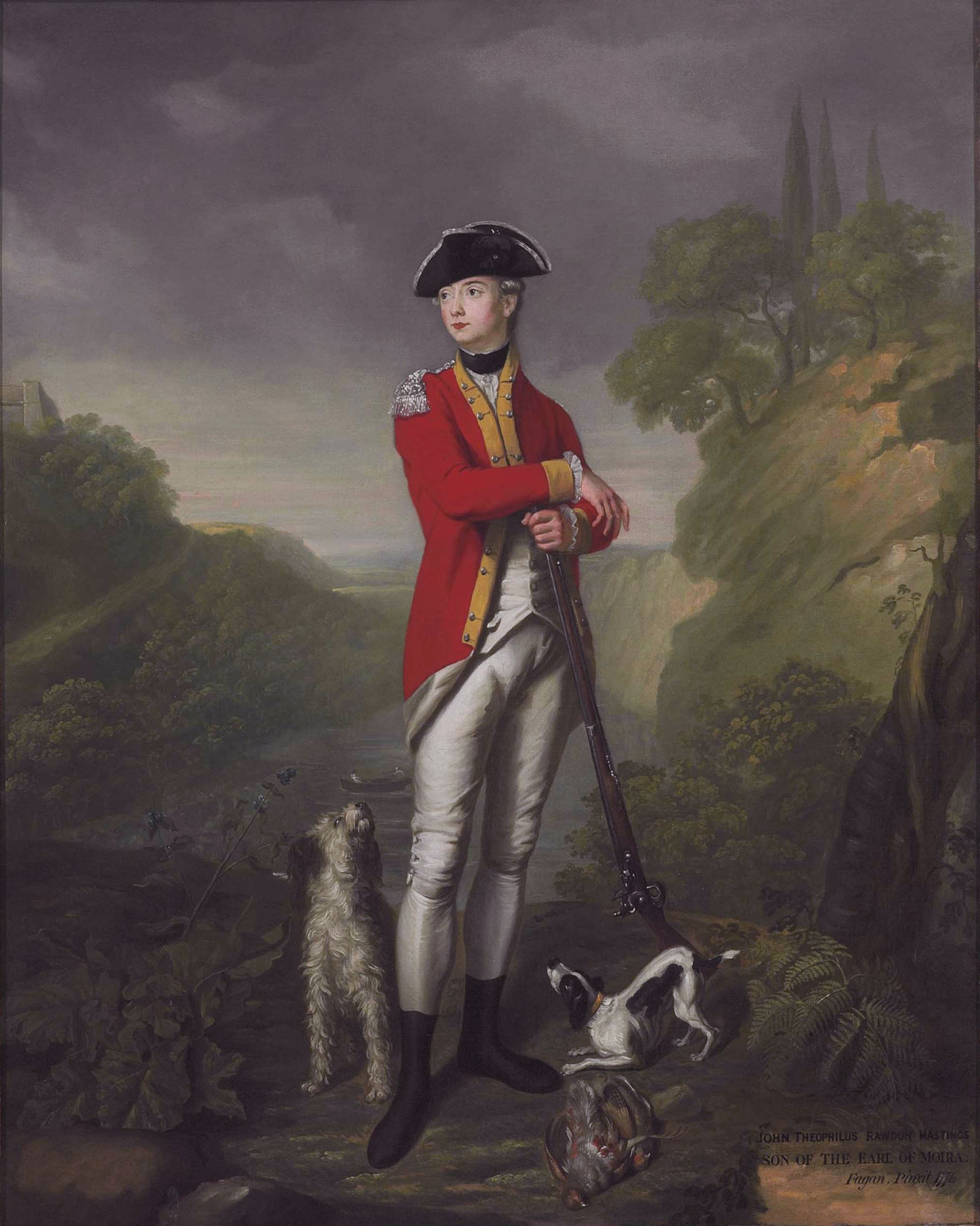
John Theophilus Rawdon-Hastings by John Trotter

The first record of John Trotter appear in 1756, when his work was lauded by the Hibernian Journal while he was still a student in the Dublin Society's School. He spent a decade studying art in Italy. He returned to Ireland, establishing a studio at Stafford Street, Dublin from 1773, and later Jervis Street and Britain Street. He exhibited in Dublin with various groups, including the Society of Artists. He best known for his portraits of military men such as John Theophilus Rawdon-Hastings.

He married fellow artist Marianne Hunter in December 1774. The couple had two daughters, Eliza H. and Mary, who were both artists. After Marianne's death, he remarried.

He died at his home at Britain Street in February 1792.

Trotter's works have been featured in exhibitions such as the An Exhibition of 17th, 18th, 19th and 20th Century Irish Paintings at Gorry Gallery, and the Exhibiting Art in Georgian Ireland at the Irish Georgian Society in 2018, which displayed a work by Trotter from a private collection, Portrait of an officer of an Irish Volunteer Regiment in a wooded landscape, holding a spontoon.

=== Notable works ===
One of his most noted works is a group portrait he executed for the boardroom of the Blue Coat School, Dublin, which was most likely painted around 1779. Along with Trotter himself (standing with palette in hand to far-right), the painting also depicts 8 other people either sitting or standing including John Wilson the secretary or registrar of the school and later executant architect after Ivory's resignation (standing far left), J Tudor, Alderman Trulock and Alderman Tucker (both on the building committee), Warner or Thomas Blackhall, Benjamin Ball (standing clothed in black, speaking with Trotter to far-right), Thomas Ivory architect (sitting in centre in maroon coat), and Simon Vierpyl sculptor (sitting to right of Ivory, in white jacket). The painting was presented to the school by the son of Benjamin Ball in 1835.
