= William Handcock (1676–1723) =

Irish politician

William Handcock (1676 – August 1723) was an Irish politician.

He was the eldest son of Thomas Handcock and his wife Dorothy Green. Handcock entered the Irish House of Commons in 1703, representing the constituency of Athlone until 1714. He sat for Dublin City from 1721 until his death two years later.

He married Sarah Warburton, daughter of Richard Warburton and had by her six sons and four daughters. His oldest son William and his sixth son John Gustavus Handcock both were also members of the Parliament of Ireland.

Parliament of Ireland
Preceded by William Handcock; Arthur St George	Member of Parliament for Athlone; 1703–1714; With: William Jones	Succeeded by William Jones; Henry St George
Preceded by John Wood; Edward Pakenham	Member of Parliament for County Westmeath; 1721–1723; With: John Wood	Succeeded by John Wood; Richard Levinge
