= Earl of Belvedere =

Irish peerage from 1756 to 1814

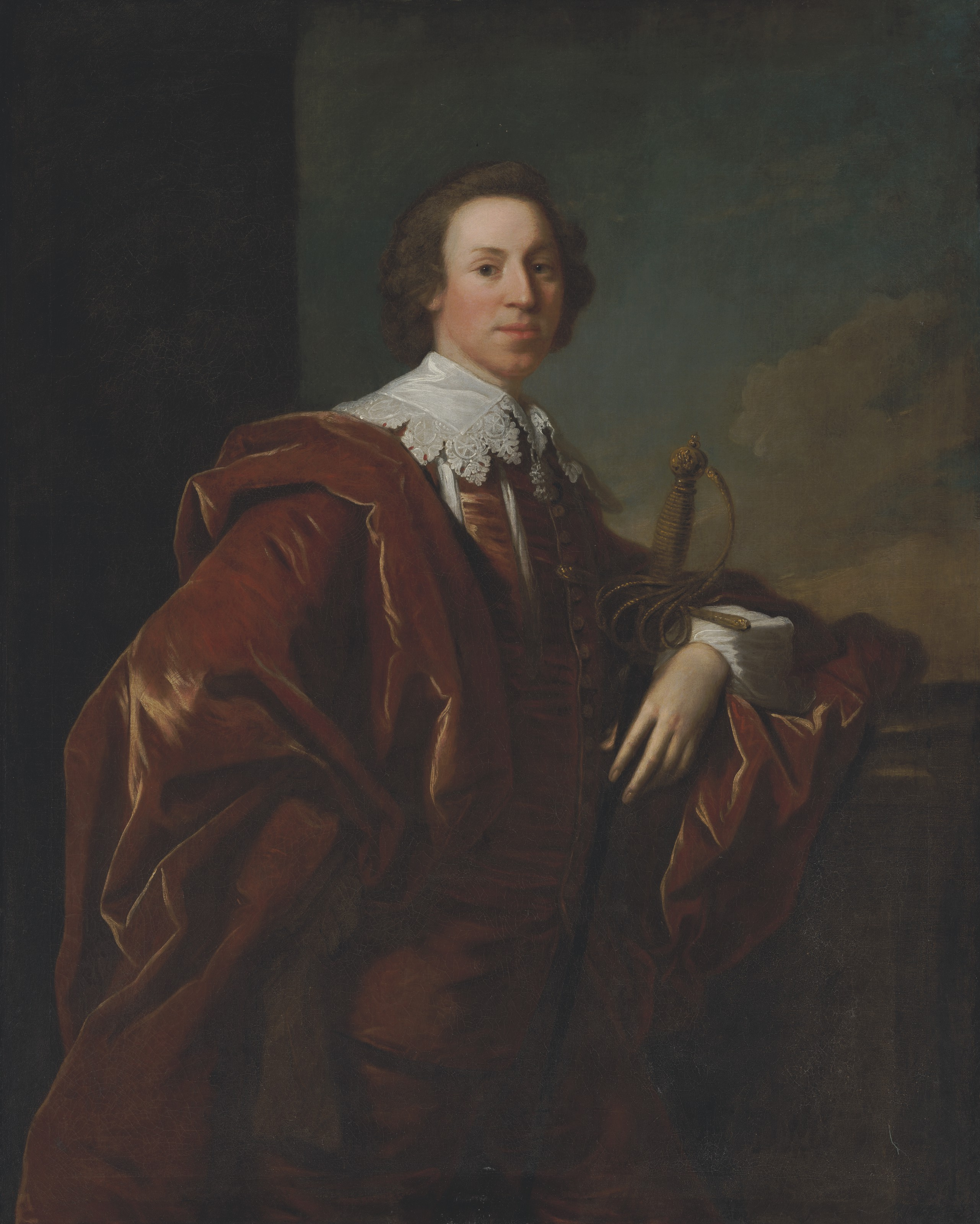
Portrait of Robert Rochfort, 1st Earl of Belvedere, by Robert Hunter

Earl of Belvedere (alternative spelling: Belvidere) was a title in the Peerage of Ireland created in 1756 for Robert Rochfort, 1st Viscount Belfield. The title and its subsidiaries became extinct in 1814.

== History ==
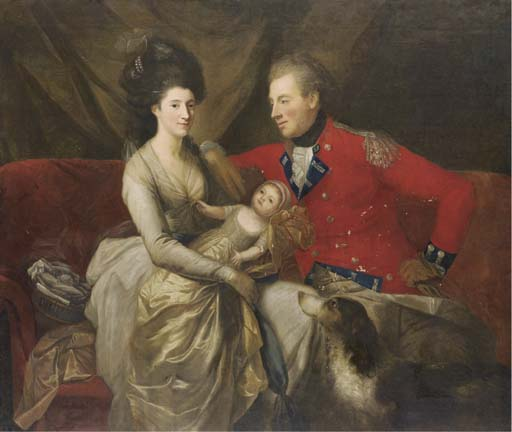
George Rochfort, 2nd Earl of Belvedere with the Countess of Belvedere and their child, c. 1804

The title was created for Robert Rochfort, an Anglo-Irish politician who had represented Westmeath in the Irish House of Commons. He was the son of Rt. Hon. George Rochfort, a politician and a descendant of the English settler Rochfort family. Robert Rochfort had already been created Baron Belfield in 1738 and Viscount Belfield in 1751, both also titles in the Peerage of Ireland. The first earl was succeeded by the eldest son from his second marriage, George Rochfort, who was also a politician. The titles became extinct upon his death in 1814.

During his life the first Earl commissioned Belvedere House, thought to be designed by Richard Castles but James Gibbs is most likely to have been the architect. It is still an admired piece of Georgian architecture and is now run by the Westmeath County Council. Robert's achievement with Belvedere House could be considered marred by his spitefulness however, as he had a 180 ft tall 'folly' built, purely to obscure the view to the house for his brother George.

=== The Rochfort family without Earldom ===
After the Earl's death, his wife remarried and bore a son whom she christened George Augustus Rochfort Boyd. He chose to live on the estate in Westmeath. A descendant of the family, George Arthur Boyd-Rochfort, was awarded the Victoria Cross for service in France during the First World War. The village of Rochfortbridge in Westmeath was named after the grandfather of the 1st Earl of Belvedere – also Robert Rochfort – (1651–1727).

== Earls of Belvedere (1756–1814) ==
Arms of the Earls of Belvedere - Azure, a Lion rampant Argent, armed and langued gules

- Robert Rochfort, 1st Earl of Belvedere (1708–1774)
- George Rochfort, 2nd Earl of Belvedere (1738–1814)
