= Robert Hunter (painter) =

Irish painter (1715–1803)

Robert Hunter (c. 1715 – c. 1803) was an Irish painter who specialised in portrait painting. He studied under the elder Pope, and had a considerable practice in Dublin in the middle of the eighteenth century. He modelled his tone of colouring on the painting of old masters.

== Life ==
Robert Hunter was born in Ulster in c. 1715. By 1748 he was creating portraits. His early work tended to be three-quarter portraits with a landscape as a background. His daughter, Marianne, was also an artist. She married the portrait painter John Trotter. His portraits were excellent likenesses, if not of the first rank in painting. He had an extensive practice until the arrival of Robert Home in 1783, who attracted Hunter's prime business. Hunter contributed frequently to the Dublin Society of Artists after helping to found it. Many of his portraits were engraved in mezzotint, including John, lord Naas (by W. Dickinson), Simon, earl Harcourt, now at Nuneham Park (by E. Fisher), Dr. Samuel Madden (by R. Purcell), John Wesley, painted in Dublin (by James Watson), and others.

The entry from A Dictionary of Irish Artists (1913) reads:

Robert Hunter, the principal portrait painter of his time in Ireland, was a native of Ulster, but of his family and of his early years nothing is known. He studied art under Thomas Pope (q.v.). A portrait by him of Tom Echlin, the noted Dublin wit, was engraved and published by Edward Lyons of Essex Street in 1752. The print was advertised in "Faulkner's Journal," 4 November 1752: "A half-length etched print of the facetious Tom Echlin, from an original painting extremely like." In 1753 Hunter painted a portrait of Sir Charles Burton, Lord Mayor, which was afterwards engraved in mezzotint by J. McArdell; and ten years later, in 1763, the Dublin Society awarded him a premium of ten guineas for a full-length portrait of Lord Taaffe, which was engraved in mezzotint the same year by John Dixon.

He contributed six works, including a "Susanna and the Elders," to the exhibition of the Society of Artists in George's Lane in 1765, and was then living in Bolton Street. In 1766 he was in Stephen Street, and from 1769 at 16 Stafford Street. He regularly contributed to the exhibitions of the Dublin Artists down to 1777, and again, for the last time, in 1800. He was employed by the Corporation of Dublin in 1788 to repair a portrait of Charles II. Hunter was for many years at the head of his profession as a portrait painter and had a large and profitable practice; but after the arrival of Robert Home in 1780 his vogue declined. In 1792 Hunter held one of the earliest one-man shows of his pictures in Dublin. He was living in 1803, but the date of his death has not been ascertained. In Carey's "Memoirs" he is described as "a walking chronicle of everything relative to the Irish artists and arts and was intimate with Madden and Prior." "Sleator's Gazetteer" for 12 March 1763, contains verses on the merits of Hunter as a portrait painter. After lauding his great genius and matchless merits the writer concludes with the lines:

Could Hogarth, Reynolds, view the bold design, They'd gladly weave their richest wreaths with thine.

Hunter's works are good in colour and evince considerable talent. An excellent example is the "Portrait of a Gentleman" which was formerly at Bellevue, Co. Wicklow, and was sold in 1906, a work which might almost pass as a Reynolds or a Cotes. W. B. S. Taylor ("Fine Arts in Great Britain and Ireland") says "he took excellent likenesses and his practice was extensive; he was truly a gentleman in feeling, and had he practised his art at a time or in a country where the arts were better understood, he would have been very eminent in his profession.

== Gallery ==
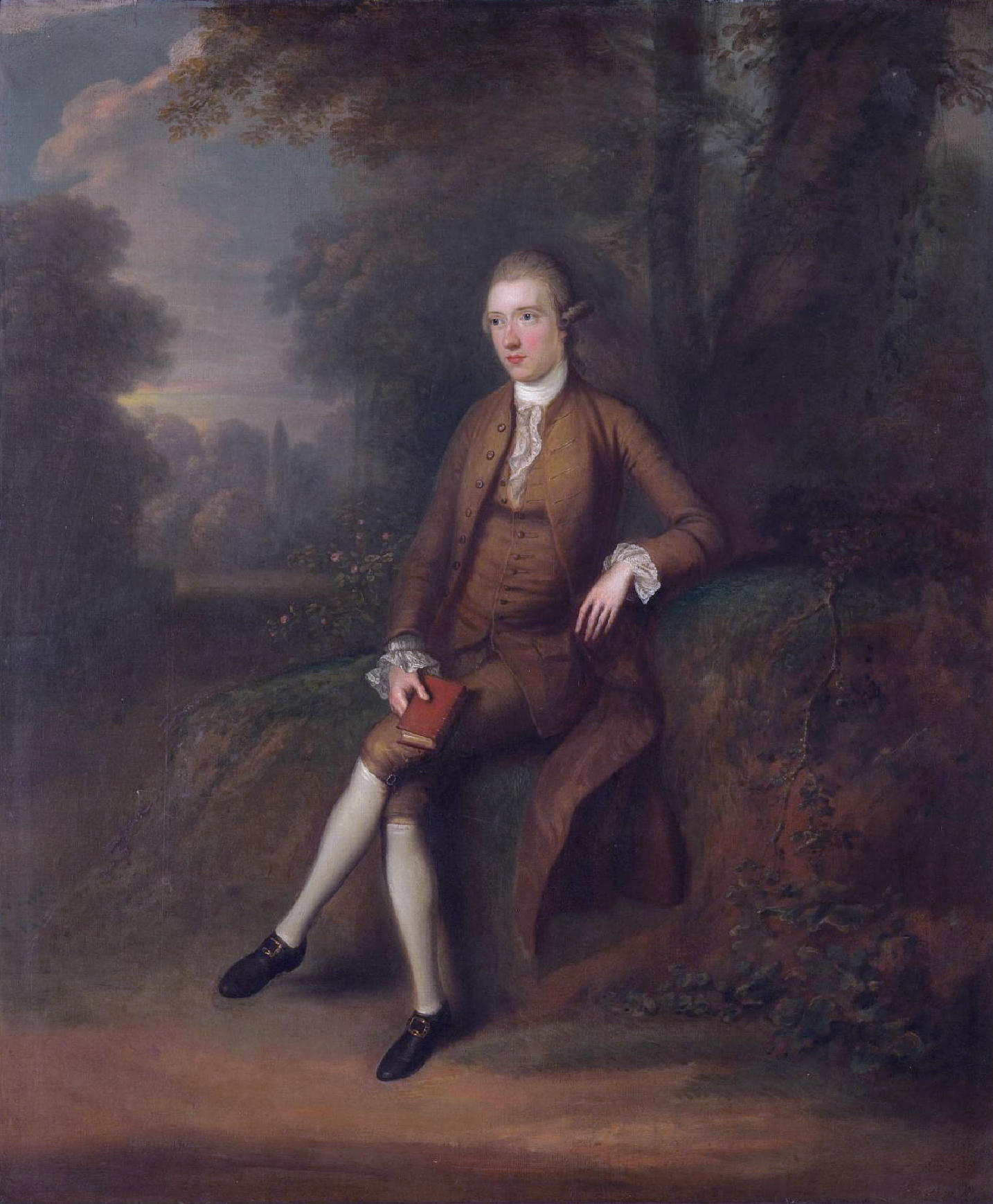
Hercules Rowley, 2nd Viscount Langford

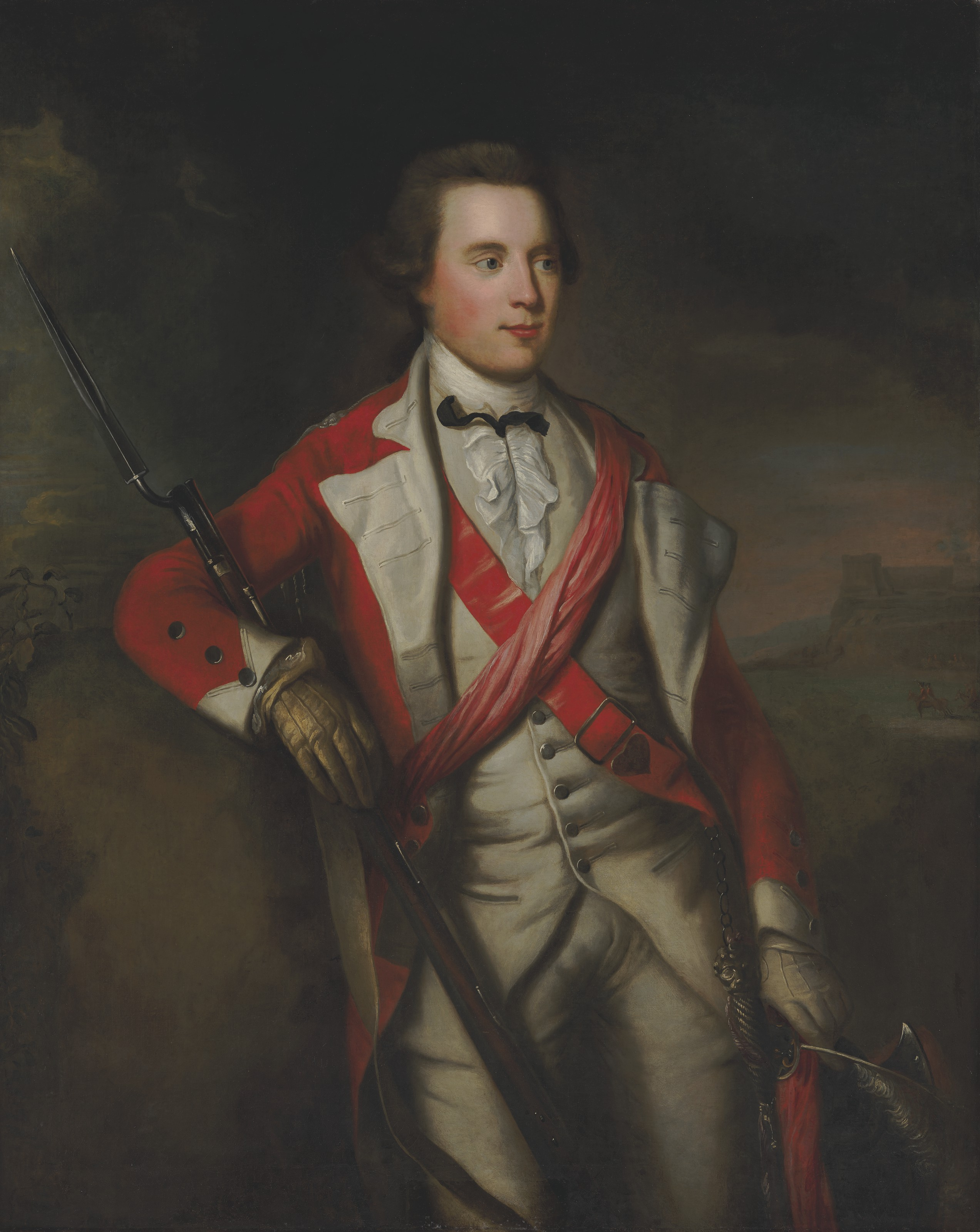
Richard Rochfort-Mervyn

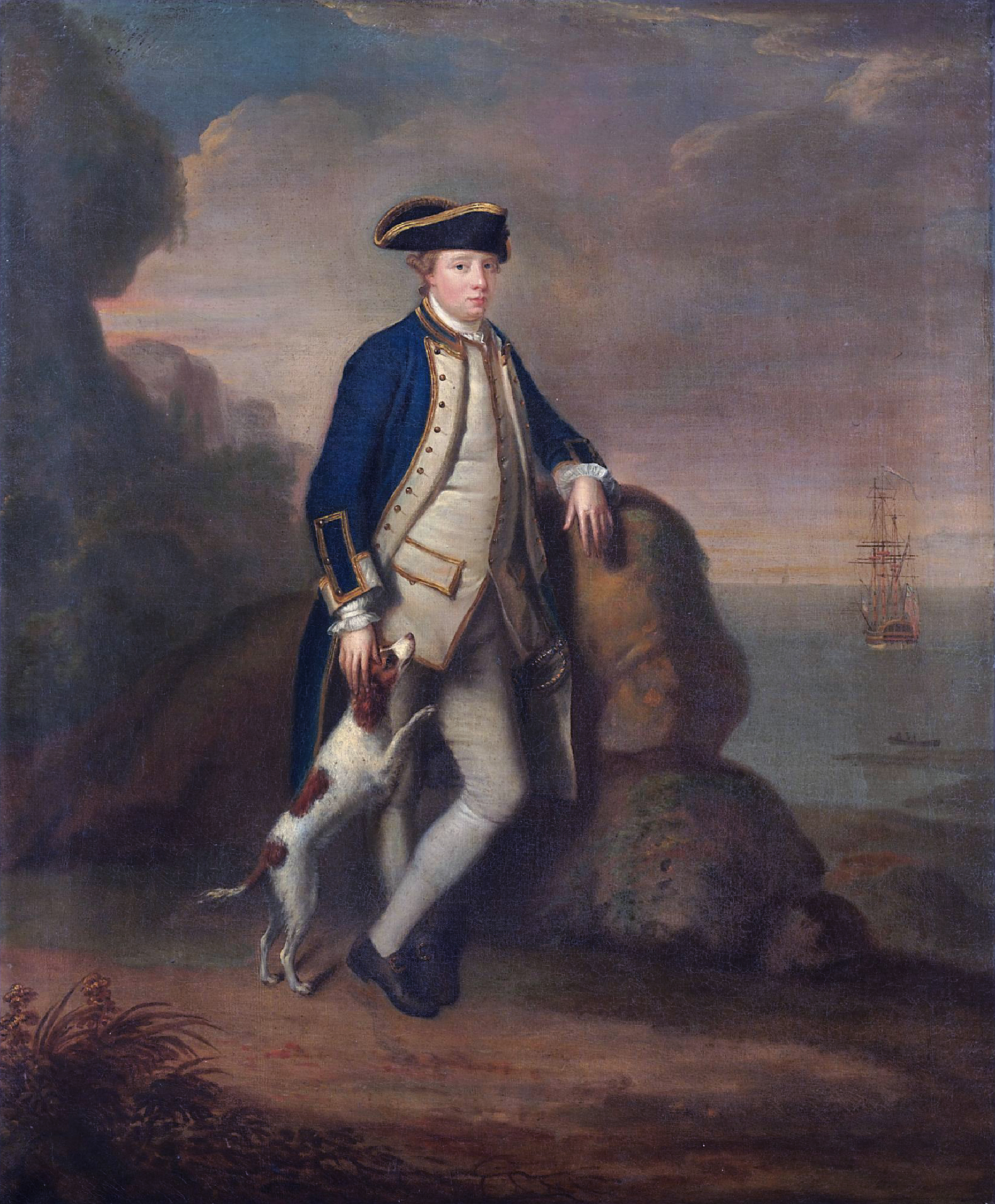
Edward Pakenham, 2nd Baron Longford

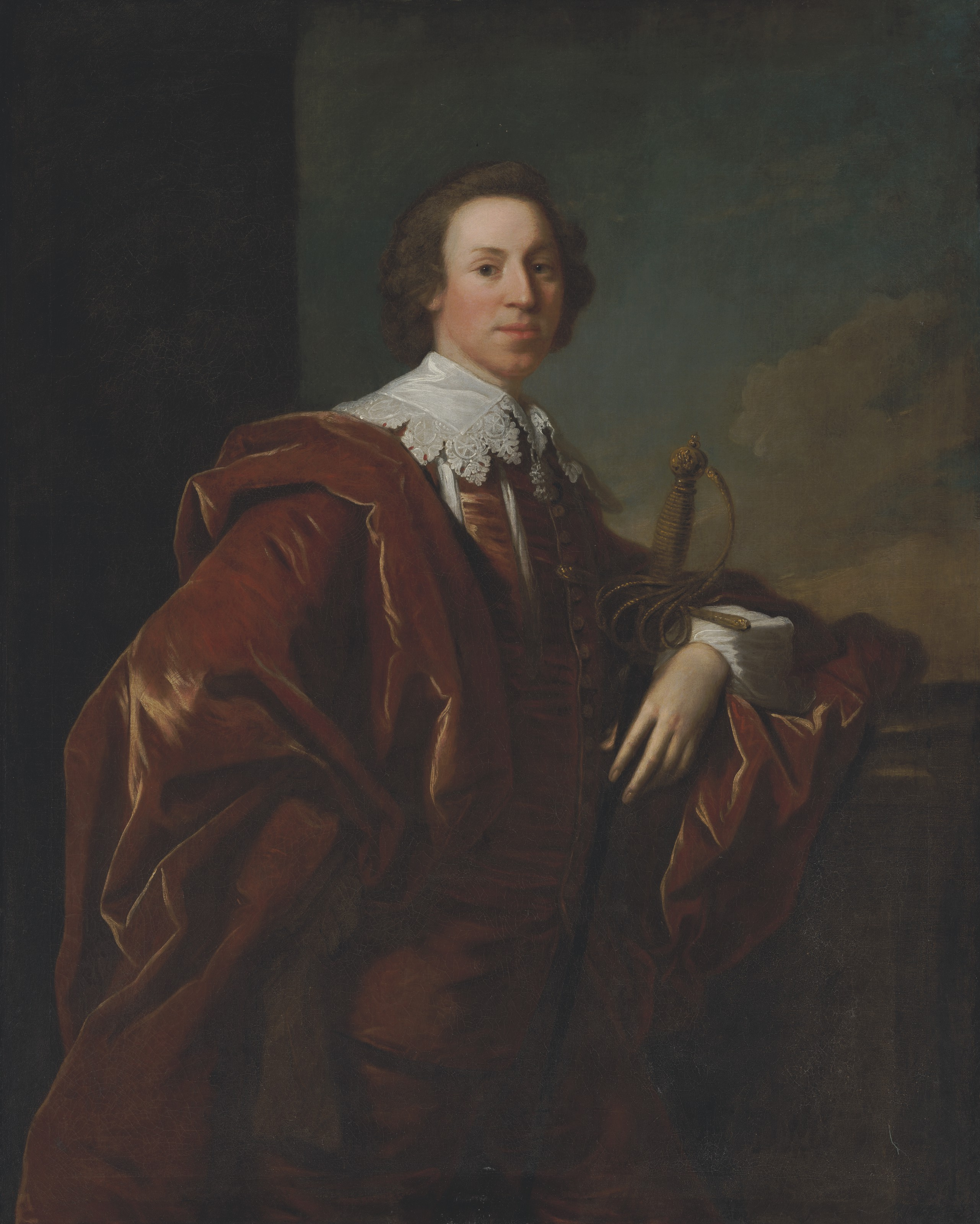
Robert Rochfort, 1st Earl of Belvedere

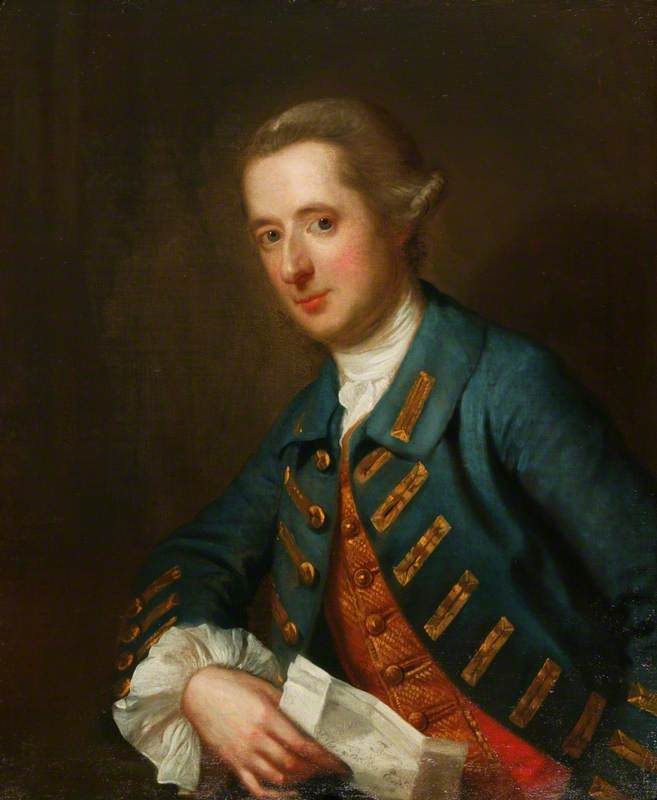
Theophilus Bolton

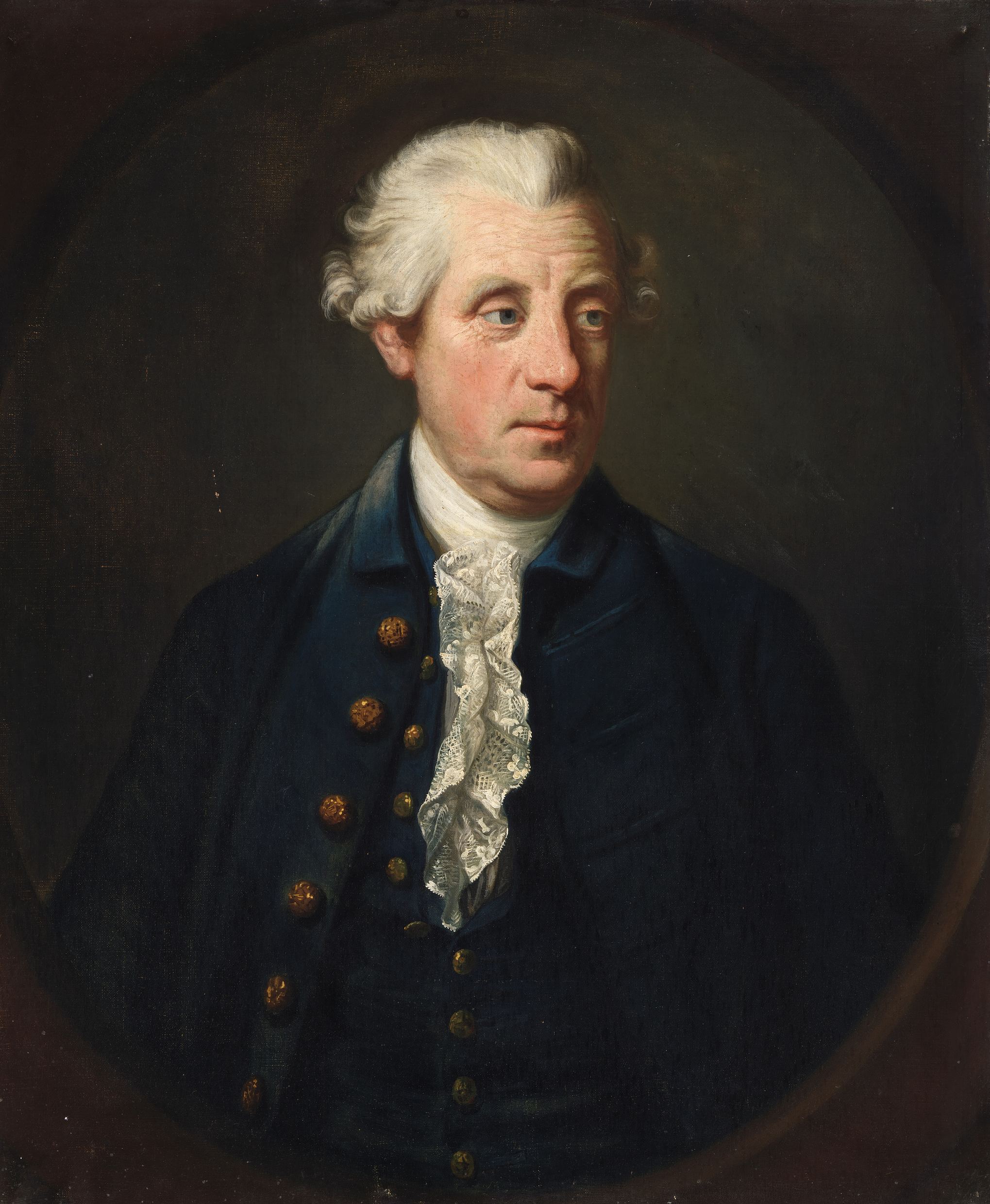
Simon Harcourt, 1st Earl Harcourt

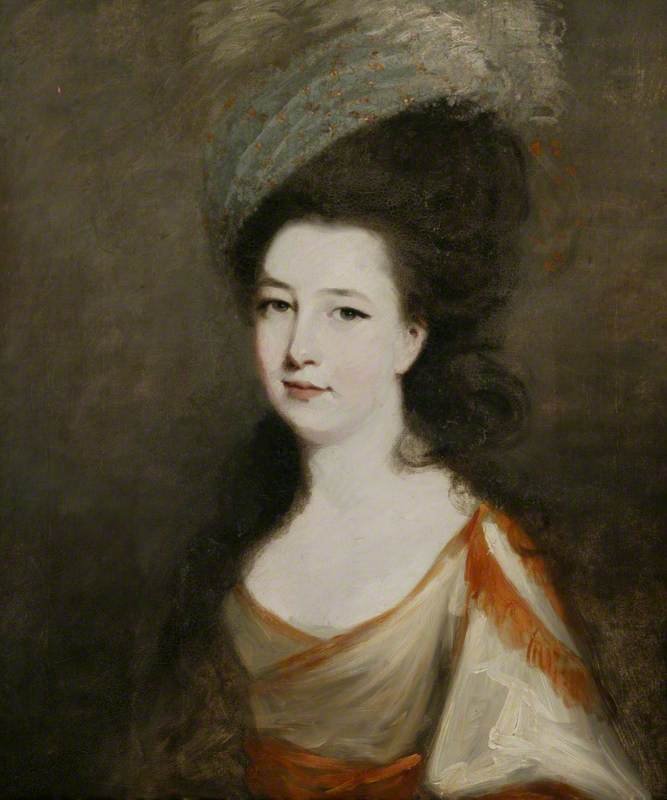
Laetitia Christina Sheridan

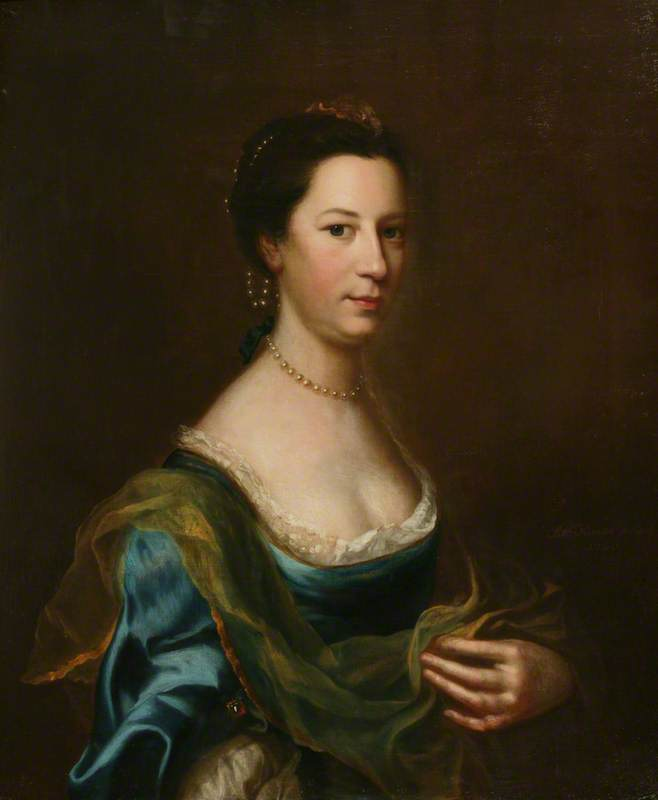
Margaret Bolton

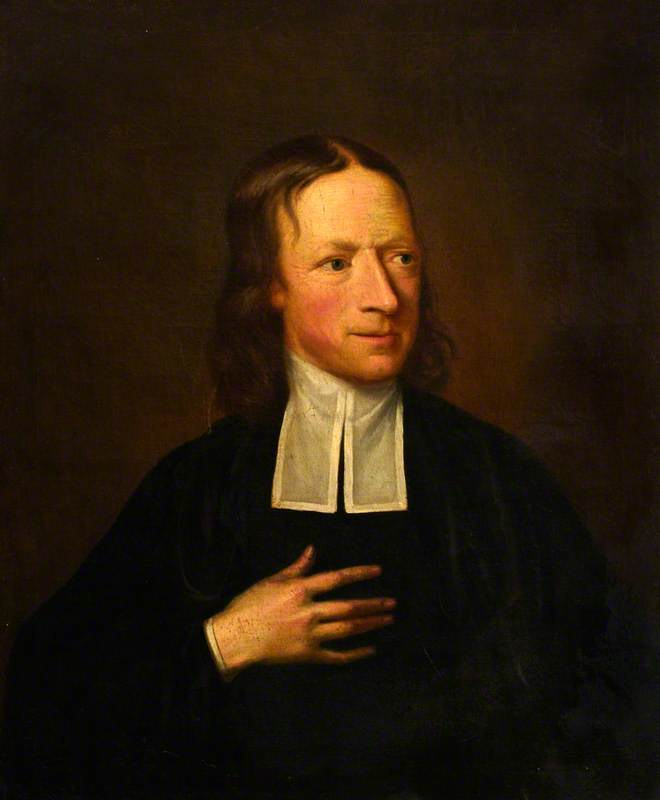
John Wesley

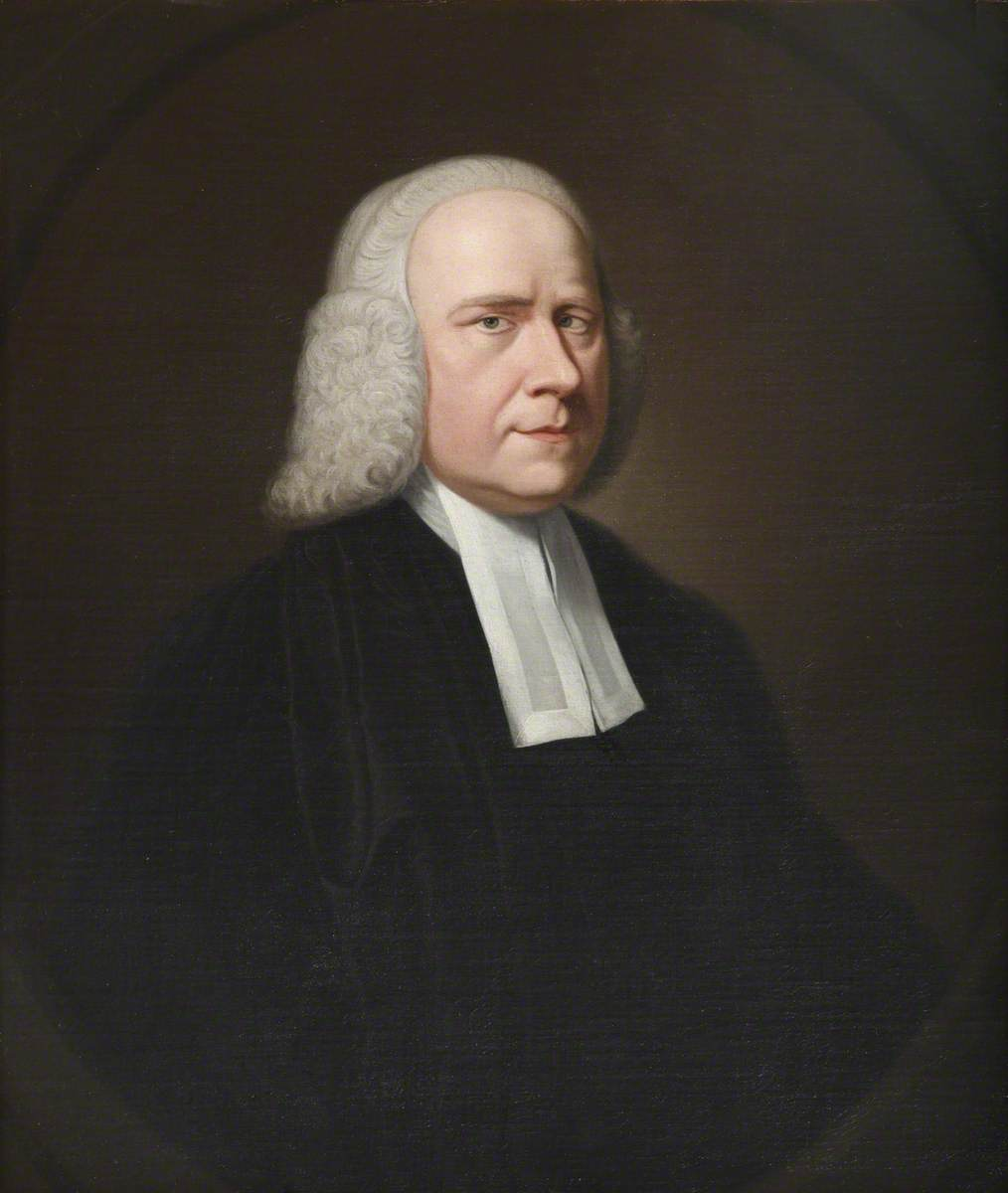
George Whitefield

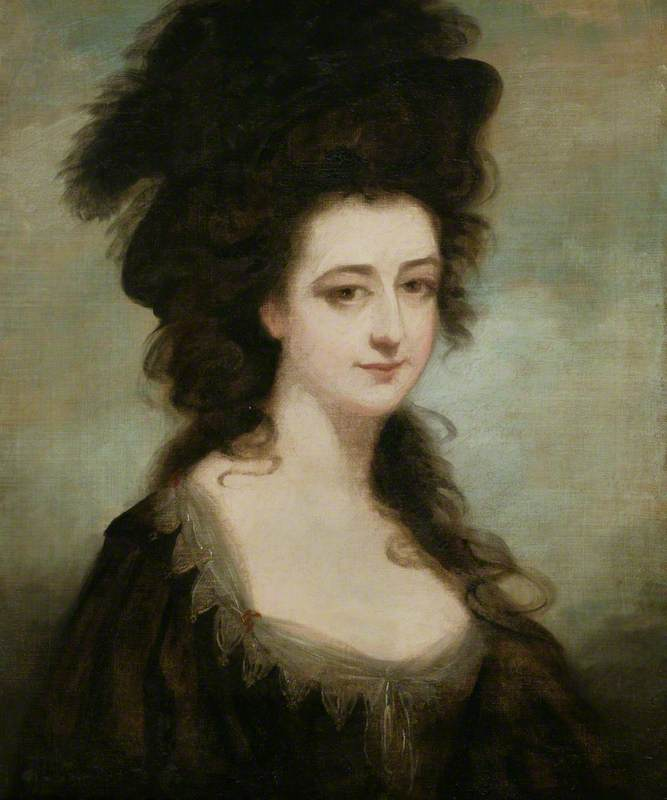
Anna Maria Neynoe

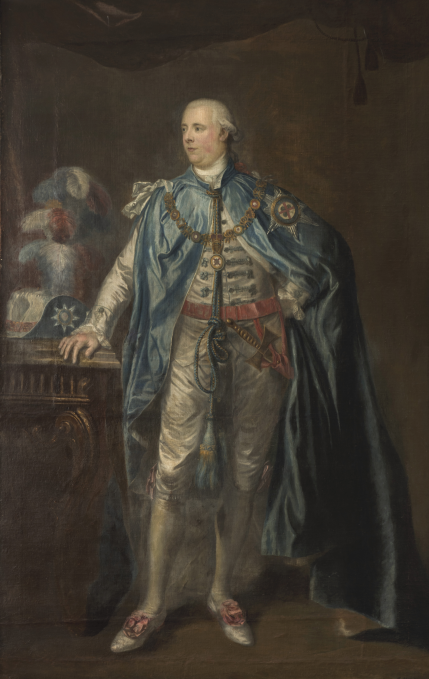
George Nugent-Temple-Grenville, 1st Marquess of Buckingham

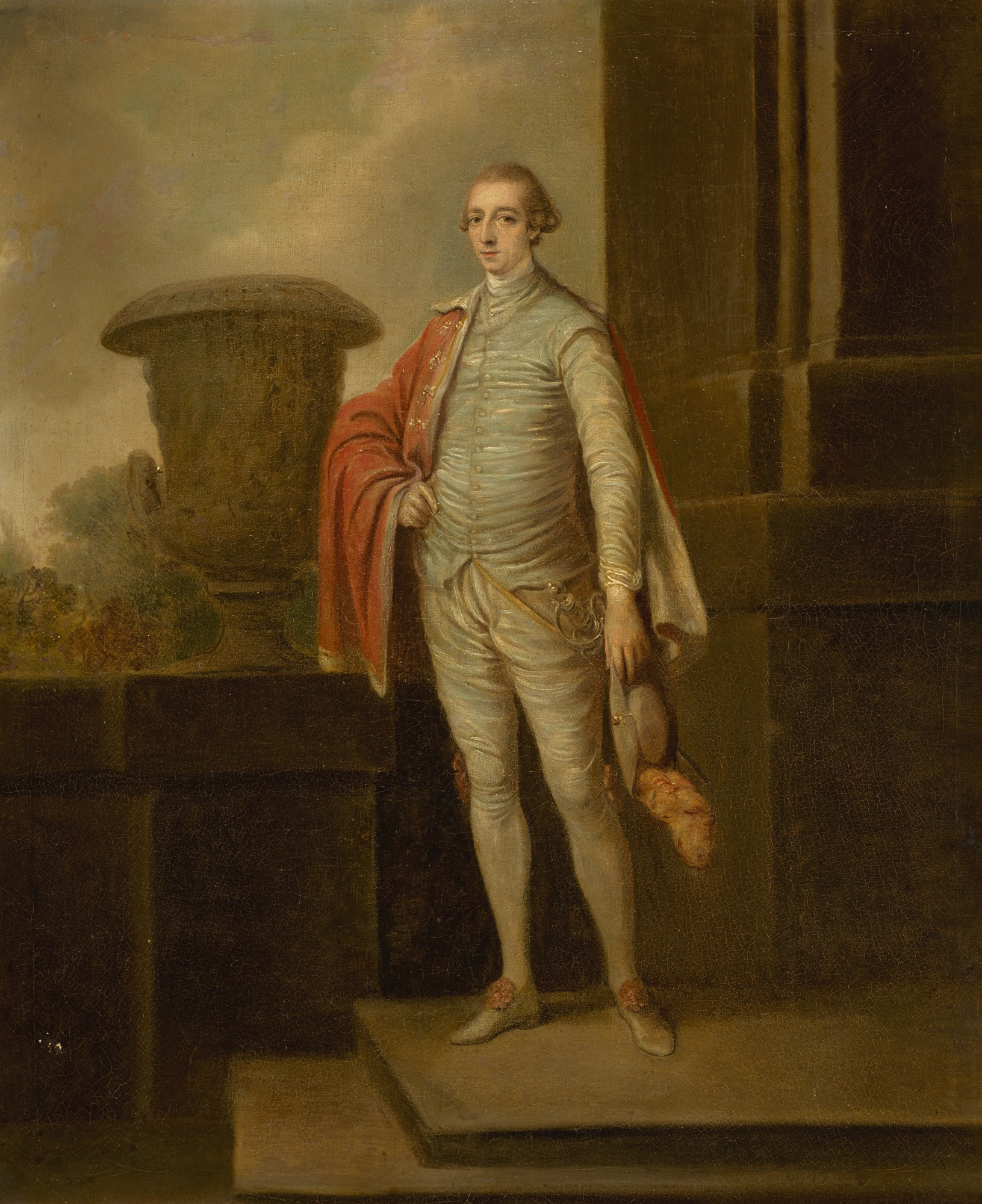
Joseph Leeson, 2nd Earl of Milltown

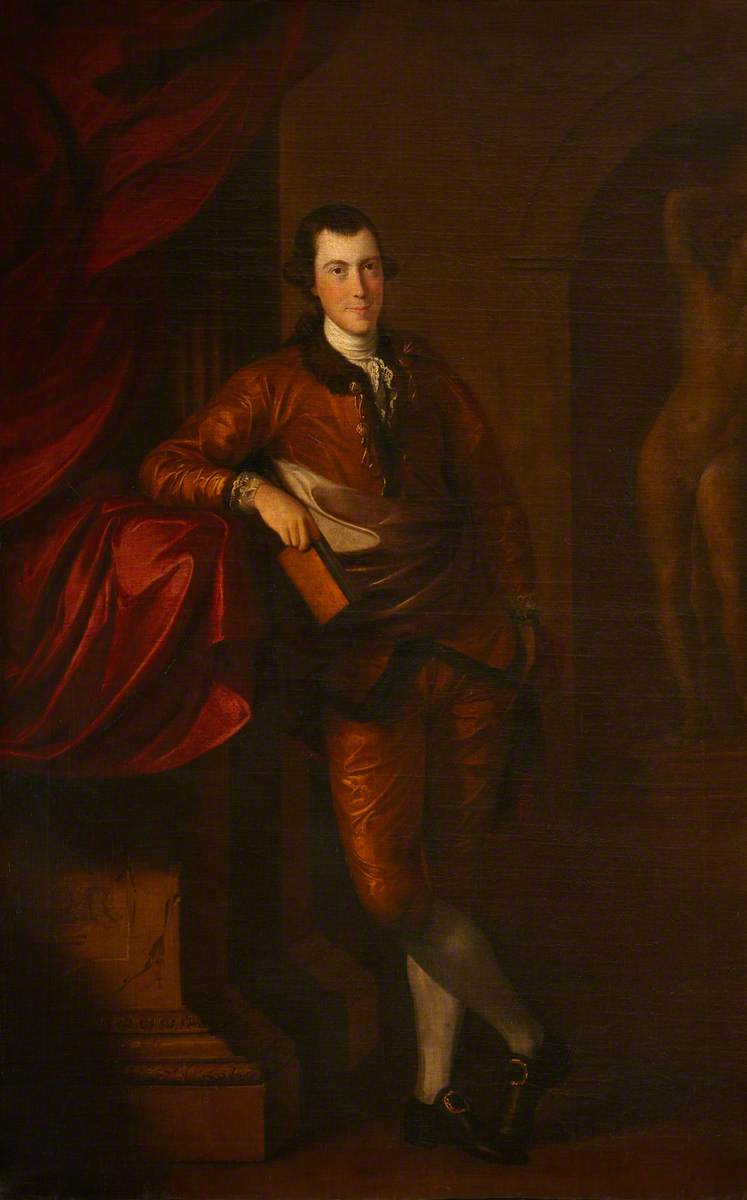
Ambrose Eccles
