= Sir Richard Levinge, 2nd Baronet =

Irish politician and landowner

Sir Richard Levinge, 2nd Baronet (c. 1685 – 27 February 1748) was an Irish landowner and politician.

He was the eldest son of Sir Richard Levinge, 1st Baronet and his first wife Mary Corbin, daughter of Gawan Corbin, merchant of London. His father, a Derbyshire man, had a remarkably successful career in Ireland as MP, Privy Councillor, Solicitor General for Ireland, Attorney General for Ireland and Chief Justice of the Irish Common Pleas. On his father's death, he inherited Parwich Hall, the ancestral home in Derbyshire, and the newer property of Knockdrin Castle, County Westmeath. He spent most of his time at Parwich, which he extensively rebuilt.

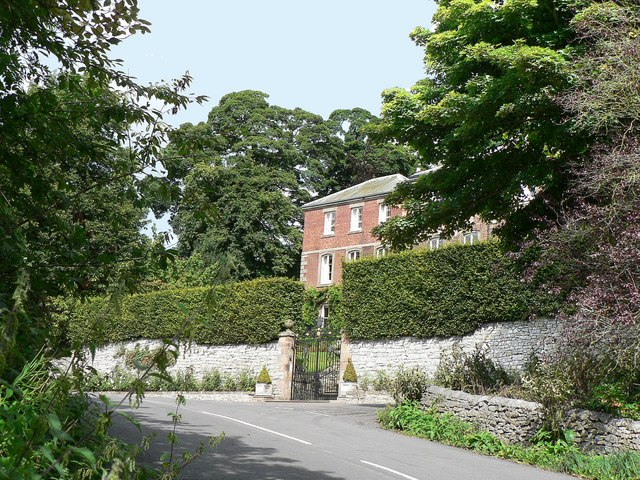
Parwich Hall, the Levinge ancestral home, which he rebuilt

He married in 1718 Isabella Rawdon (died 1731), daughter of Sir Arthur Rawdon, 2nd Baronet and Helena Graham; her brother John married Richard's sister Dorothy. They had no issue and on his death, his title and estates passed to his brother Charles.

He sat in the House of Commons of Ireland from 1723 to 1727 as a member for County Westmeath, and then from 1727 to 1748 as a member for Blessington.

Parliament of Ireland
Preceded by John Wood; William Handcock	Member of Parliament for County Westmeath; 1723 – 1727; With: John Wood	Succeeded by Anthony Malone; John Wood
Preceded by Joseph Slattery; David Dunbar	Member of Parliament for Blessington; 1727 – 1748; With: Anthony Malone 1727; Patrick French 1727–45; Charles Ussher from 1745	Succeeded by Charles Ussher; Joseph Kelly
Baronetage of Ireland
Preceded by Richard Levinge	Baronet (of High Park); 1748 – 1762	Succeeded by Charles Levinge
