= Linda Gillard =

British writer

Linda Gillard lives in the Scottish Highlands and has been an actress, journalist and teacher. She is the author of seven novels, including STAR GAZING, short-listed in 2009 for Romantic Novel of the Year and HOUSE OF SILENCE, which became a Kindle bestseller and was selected by Amazon UK as one of their Top Ten Best of 2011 in the Indie Author category.
