= Thomas Handcock =

Irish politician

Thomas Handcock (28 May 1654 – 1726) was an Irish politician.

He was the eldest son of William Handcock and his wife Abigail, daughter of Sir Thomas Stanley and sister of Thomas Stanley. His younger brother was Sir William Handcock, Recorder of Dublin. In 1692, Handcock entered the Irish House of Commons, representing Lanesborough until 1699.

On 5 July 1677, he married Dorothy Green, and had, by her, four sons and four daughters. His oldest son William sat also in the Parliament of Ireland.

Parliament of Ireland
Preceded by Fergus Farrell; Sir Humphrey Jervis	Member of Parliament for Lanesborough; 1692–1699; With: Sir Humphrey Jervis 1692–1693; Richard Gardiner 1695–1699	Succeeded by Nicholas Sankey; Henry Fox
