= Seth Gilliard =

American violinist

Seth Gilliard, also Seth G is an American violinist based in South Carolina who covers pop tunes.

== Early life ==
Gilliard began playing the violin when he was five years old, influenced by his mother, who played the viola in high school. Gilliard attended Ashley River School of the Creative Arts and Porter-Gaud School.

== College and later career ==
In 2012, Gilliard graduated from Furman University with a major in violin performance. At Furman, he was the concertmaster of the school orchestra. His debut E.P., "The Introduction of Seth g." was released on February 28, 2013.

He has uploaded many of his songs to YouTube. "Thinkin Bout You", a Frank Ocean cover, has been one of his more popular songs. Gilliard says that he only performs renditions of songs he enjoys.
