= Crom =

Crom or CROM may refer to:

== Places ==
- Crom, a townland in County Fermanagh, Northern Ireland
- Crom Estate, a Northern Irish National Trust Property
  - Crom Castle
- Ben Crom, a mountain in the Mourne Mountains in County Down, Northern Ireland
- Croom Castle or Crom Castle, a castle in Croom, County Limerick, Ireland

== Fiction and folklore ==
- Crom Cruach, a deity of pre-Christian Ireland
- Crom Dubh, a mythological and folkloric figure of Ireland
- Crom, a fictional character in the 1982 film Tron played by Peter Jurasik
- Crom (fictional deity), a fictional deity in the Conan the Barbarian world
- Crom, a coal mining settlement in the Dragonriders of Pern science fiction series

== People ==
- Rick Crom (born 1957), American actor, singer, comedian, lyricist, and composer
- Crom Ua Donnubáin or Crom O'Donovan (died 1254), the ancestor of O'Donovans later found in Carbery in County Cork,

== Sports ==
- The Adelaide Crows, an Australian rules football club that plays in the AFL

== Other uses ==
- Confederación Regional Obrera Mexicana (Regional Confederation of Mexican Workers), a federation of labor unions in Mexico

== See also ==
- Croom, County Limerick, Ireland
- Ronan Le Crom (born 1974), French football goalkeeper
- Chrom, a character in the Fire Emblem series
