= County Westmeath (Parliament of Ireland constituency) =

Pre-1801 Irish constituency

- Former county constituency for the Irish House of Commons
- County: County Westmeath

–1801
- Seats: 2
- Replaced by: County Westmeath (UKHC)

County Westmeath was a constituency represented in the Irish House of Commons until the Acts of Union in 1800. Between 1725 and 1793 Catholics and those married to Catholics could not vote. Under the terms of the Acts of Union 1800, it was succeeded by the Westminter constituency of County Westmeath.

== Members of Parliament ==
It returned two members to the Parliament of Ireland.

- 1560
  - Sir Thomas Nugent
  - Sir George Stanley
- 1585
  - Edward Nugent of Dysert
  - Edward Nugent of Morton
- 1613–1615
  - Sir Christopher Nugent of Meyrath
  - Edward Nugent of Portloman (died and replaced 1615 by Edmond Nugent of Roconnel)
- 1634–1635
  - Sir James Dillon
- 1639–1649
  - Sir James Dillon (expelled 1642 as rebel)
  - Sir Luke Fitzgerald of Tecroghan (expelled 1642 as rebel)
- 1661–1666
  - William Handcock
  - Thomas Longe

=== 1689–1801 ===
Election	First MP	Second MP
1689	William Nugent	Hon Col. Henry Dillon
1692	Dillon Pollard	Robert Rochfort
1695	George Peyton	Robert Rochfort
1703	William Handcock	Robert Rochfort
1707	George Rochfort	Robert Rochfort
1707	George Rochfort	John Cooke
1713	George Rochfort	Edward Pakenham
1715	John Wood	Edward Pakenham
1721	John Wood	William Handcock
1723	John Wood	Richard Levinge
1727	George Rochfort	Anthony Malone
1731	Robert Rochfort	Anthony Malone
1738	Arthur Rochfort	Anthony Malone
1761	George Rochfort, Viscount Belfield	Richard Rochfort
1768	George Rochfort, Viscount Belfield	Anthony Malone
1776	Robert Rochfort	Benjamin Chapman
1783	Robert Rochfort	Richard Malone
1784	Robert Rochfort	William Smyth
1798	Gustavus Hume Rochfort	William Smyth
1801	Replaced by Westminster constituency County Westmeath	
