= James Rochfort =

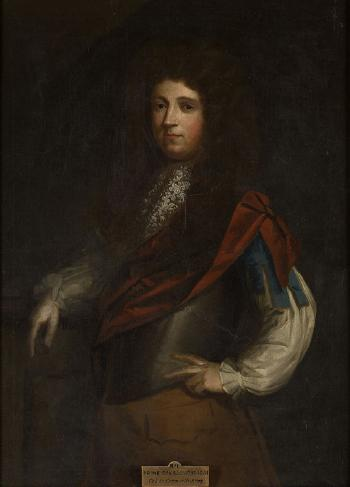
James Primeiron Rochfort

James Rochfort (died 1652) was a leading lieutenant colonel in Oliver Cromwell's Army during the English Civil War. He was better known by the nickname Prime Iron Rochfort.

== Early life ==
James Rochfort was the son of James Rochfort, who in turn was the son of Walter Rochfort and Catherine Sarsfield of Agherry, County Wicklow.

== Career ==
James Rochfort of Clogrenane, County Cork served under Sir Charles Coote's regiment in 1641. By 1642 he was a Captain of Foot stationed in Naas with 100 other men. In 1647 he was described as a lieutenant colonel under Colonel Long.

He married Thomasine Piggott Hull, daughter of Sir Robert Piggott, and widow of Argentine Hull of Leamcon, County Cork, who died in 1637. Thomasine had two children with her first husband, Charles (b 1636) and Mary (b 1638).

With James Rochfort they had two daughters, Thomasine (1648-1848) and Dorothy (born 1649). They also had two sons, including the eldest son and heir Robert Rochfort.

== Death ==
Lieutenant Colonel James Rochfort was court martialed, sentenced to death and executed for the death of Major Turner on 9 March 1652. The trial indicated that the Major was bludgeoned to the head without intent to kill, likely the result of a duel. The major later died of his wounds.
