= William Gillard =

English painter and ceramicist

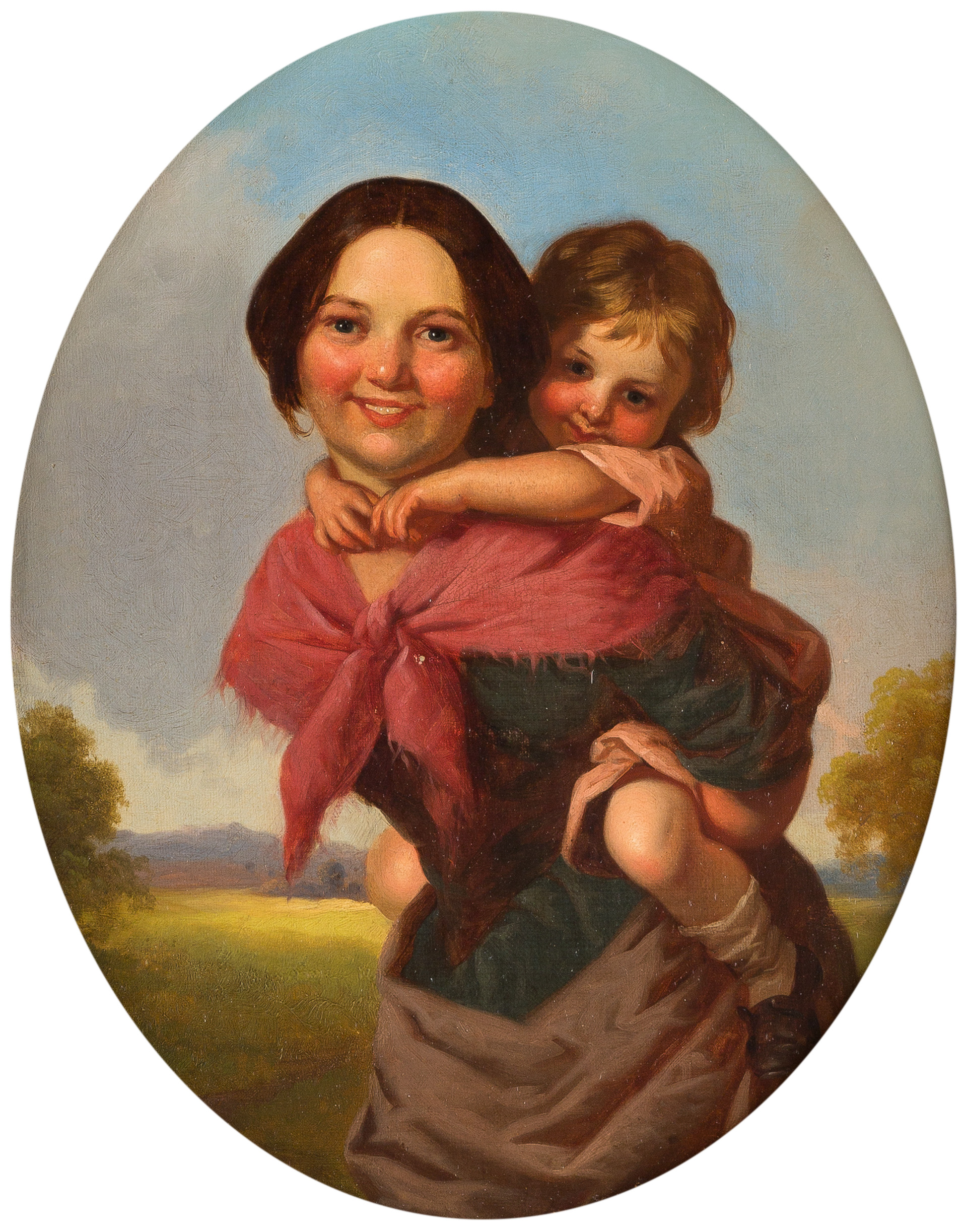
William Gillard: Irish Girl and Child,1855

William Gillard (c. 1812 – 1897) was a British artist. Born in Bristol to a well-known family of stonemasons, William Gillard was apprenticed at 14 for six years to a Bristol carver and gilder, but at 18 he had already exhibited a painting in Ireland, a country he fell in love with and where he would spend long periods working as a painter and a modeller of ceramic figures.

His paintings cover a wide range of subjects, most of them on a fairly small canvas and executed either in water colours, or, predominantly, in oils: genre pictures, portraits, landscapes, and more increasingly in later life, still lifes and paintings of dogs, in which genre he became a specialist. In early years he liked to treat the same subject both as a painting and as a ceramic model. It is not yet known if he continued this practice, as only one later ceramic work has been traced, namely the piece cited by L Lewellyn Jewitt in The Ceramic Art of Great Britain : "Repentance, Faith and Resignation modelled by Mr. Gillard."

In 1876 he left Ireland for good, returning first to Liverpool, a city he had long connections with, then alternating between Chester and The Potteries. He died in Stoke-on-Trent in January 1897, having exhibited consistently in both Ireland (chiefly in Dublin) and in Birmingham for decades.
