= Ernest Thomas Gilliard =

American ornithologist and museum curator

- Born: November 23, 1912; York, Pennsylvania, U.S.
- Died: January 26, 1965 (aged 52); New York, U.S.
- Spouse: Margaret Fitzell Tifft Gillard
- Scientific career
- Fields: Ornithologist, curator
- Institutions: American Museum of Natural History, New York

Ernest Thomas Gilliard (23 November 1912 – 26 January 1965) was an American ornithologist and museum curator who led or participated in several ornithological expeditions, especially to South America and New Guinea.

Gilliard was born in York, Pennsylvania. He began a lifelong association with the American Museum of Natural History (AMNH) in New York in 1932 by working there as a volunteer. In 1933 he was employed there as an assistant and subsequently passed through the full range of promotions to become Curator of Birds in 1963, unexpectedly dying in office two years later, in his 53rd year, of a sudden heart attack.

During the 1930s Gilliard was involved in expeditions to Quebec, Newfoundland and Venezuela, and in the 1940s to Brazil, the Philippines and New Guinea. The 1950s saw more expeditions, not only to New Guinea, but also to Nepal and the West Indies. New Guinea, and especially its birds-of-paradise and bowerbirds, kept drawing him back, and he led a total of five expeditions there, his final one in 1964.

In addition to numerous papers in the scientific publications of the AMNH, he wrote many illustrated articles for Natural History and the National Geographic Magazine. He wrote Living Birds of the World (1958), Birds of Paradise and Bower Birds (1969), and coauthored (with Austin L. Rand) the Handbook of New Guinea Birds (1967). Gilliard was an expert photographer and cinematographer; he was involved in making the documentary Search for Paradise (1957), which was directed by Otto Lang.
