= George Rochfort (politician) =

Anglo-Irish politician

George Rochfort (21 January 1682 – 8 July 1730) was an Anglo-Irish politician.

== Biography ==
Rochford was the eldest son of Robert Rochfort and Hannah Handcock. On 24 January 1704, he married Lady Elizabeth Moore, daughter of Henry Hamilton-Moore, 3rd Earl of Drogheda and Mary Cole. The couple had eleven children, including Robert Rochfort, 1st Earl of Belvedere and Arthur Rochfort.

He was the Member of Parliament for County Westmeath in the Irish House of Commons between 1707 and 1714. He was Chief Chamberlain of the Exchequer of Ireland and made a member of the Privy Council of Ireland. He represented County Westmeath in the Irish Parliament again between 1727 and his death in 1730.

Parliament of Ireland
Preceded by William Handcock; Robert Rochfort	Member of Parliament for County Westmeath; 1707–1714; With: Robert Rochfort (1707); John Cooke (1707–1713); Edward Pakenham (1707–1714)	Succeeded by John Wood; Edward Pakenham
Preceded by John Wood; Sir Richard Levinge, Bt	Member of Parliament for County Westmeath; 1727–1730; With: Anthony Malone	Succeeded by Robert Rochfort; Anthony Malone
