= Robert Perceval =

Irish physician and chemist

- Born: 30 September 1756; Dublin, Ireland
- Died: 3 March 1839 (aged 82)

Robert Perceval (30 September 1756 – 3 March 1839) was an Irish medical doctor, chemist, and traveller. He was the first professor of chemistry at Trinity College Dublin and a founding member of the Royal Irish Academy. He was called the "father of the medical profession in Dublin".

== Early life and family ==
Robert Perceval was born in Dublin on 30 September 1756. His parents were Elizabeth (née Ward; died 30 November 1770) and William Perceval, barrister. This was his father's second marriage, and Perceval was their third and youngest son. He was a descendant of Richard Percivale, and a grandson of William Perceval. Perceval attended Dr Darby's school in Ballygall, Finglas, County Dublin, and began his studies in Trinity College Dublin on 27 April 1772. He graduated with a BA in 1777, and moved to Edinburgh to study medicine in 1778, graduating in 1780. While in Edinburgh, he attended lectures by the chemist Joseph Black which likely sparked Perceval's own interest in chemistry.

In May 1785, he married Anne Brereton. They had one child, the Reverend William Perceval.

== Career ==
He began a grand tour of Europe in June 1780, and used the trip to visit places of scientific interest and colleges, avoiding the more popular and social destinations of most travellers of the time. He started his tour in Holland, visiting the college at Leiden, then travelling to Paris where he stayed over the winter of 1780 to 1781. In Paris, he visited hospital clinics, and became an acquaintance of the physician, Alphonse Leroy. He attended lecturers by Antoine François, comte de Fourcroy. He left Paris in April 1781, travelling on foot the 200 miles (320 km) to Chalon. He then explored the geologically volcanic areas around Lyon, and visited the mines at the comte de Buffon. While in Dijon he met the chemists C. A. H. G. de Virly and Louis-Bernard Guyton de Morveau. He remained in contact with many of these French chemists, later arranging their election as members of the Royal Irish Academy. He stayed in Switzerland during the summer and autumn of 1781, before returning to London in November for further studies.

Perceval returned to Dublin in late 1782, and was admitted as a licentiate and fellow of the Royal College of Physicians of Ireland (RCPI) in 1783. The same year, he became the first professor of chemistry at TCD, a position he held until 1808. He was also a member of the Medico-Philosophical Society. In 1785, he was among the founding members of the Royal Irish Academy, and served as its first secretary. He was also a founding member of the Dublin General Dispensary in Temple Bar the same year and within 1785, and was also elected a member of the American Philosophical Society in Philadelphia. He was appointed as inspector of apothecaries in 1786, and became an unpopular figure with some of the membership of the Guild of Apothecaries due to his rigorous testing. In 1793, he graduated from TCD with an MB and MD. He was an advocate for the introduction of clinical lectures at the RCPI, and lobbied for funds to build a new clinical hospital from local government. The RCPI was awarded £1,000 from the estate of Sir Patrick Dun under the School of Physic Act 1791 (31 Geo. 3. c. 35 (I)). This resulted in the opening of Sir Patrick Dun's Hospital in 1793 on Blind Quay (now Essex Quay). He was dissatisfied with this outcome, and continued to lobby for the funding of a new, purpose-built, clinical hospital. This resulted in the Irish house of lords launching an enquiry into the administration of Sir Patrick Dun's estate in April 1799. The resulting report led to the school of physic act of 1800, which instructed that a new clinical hospital was to be funded from the Dun estate. However, this act removed the Dun estate from the RCPI administration, and led to Perceval being censured. In November 1799, he was elected president of the RCPI, but resigned in August 1800 as a clause in the school of physic act of 1800 prohibited any TCD professor from holding a fellowship of the RCPI. In October 1800, Perceval was made an honorary fellow of the RCPI.

In 1805, he sat on the committee investigating the spread of fever, and served as a governor of Dr Steevens' Hospital. He was also a member of the Prison Discipline Society due to his interest in prison reform. This society was merged with the Howard Society, and Perceval became known as the "Irish Howard". He was appointed physician general to the forces in Ireland in March 1819, but sue to his declining health, he resigned in 1820. In later life, Perceval suffered with an illness that began with swelling of his hands, and later his hip joints, and caused him intense pain. While attending a levee in honour of George IV in Dublin Castle in 1821, he attempted to approach the king without a crutch. His pain was so evident that the king offered him his arm for support.

Perceval died on 3 March 1838, and in accordance to his wishes, his remains were offered to the Pathological Society. His hip joints were removed and preserved in the Medical School Museum at TCD. Dr Charles Philips Croker presented the RCPI with an oil portrait of Perceval by William Gillard in 1844. PRONI hold a large collection of Perceval's letters, with further collections held in Bibliothèque Publique, Dijon, and the Bibliothèque Publique et Universitaire, Geneva. After his death he was proclaimed the "father of the medical profession in Dublin". A lamp furnace he designed to control the heat of chemical reactions is held in the Playfair Collection of chemical apparatus in the Royal Scottish Museum in Edinburgh.

== Publications ==
- Tentamen physiologicum inaugurale de corde (MD thesis), Edinburgh (1780)
- "Chemical communications and inquiries" in Transactions of the Royal Irish Academy (1790)
- "Account of a chamber furnace" in Transactions of the Royal Irish Academy (1790)
- "On the solution of lead by lime" in Transactions of the Royal Irish Academy (1793)
- "An account of some chalybeate preparations" in Transactions of the Royal Irish Academy (1810)
- An account of the bequest of Sir Patrick Dun (1804)
- An essay to establish the divinity of Christ (1821)
