= George Rochfort, 2nd Earl of Belvedere =

Anglo-Irish politician

The Right Honourable The Earl of Belvedere
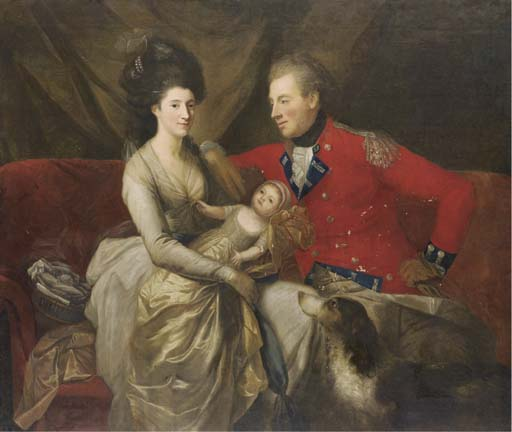
- George Rochfort in volunteer uniform and his second wife, Jane, with baby
- Born: George Augustus Rochfort; 12 October 1738
- Died: 13 May 1814 (aged 75); Dublin, Ireland
- Occupations: Peer, politician

George Augustus Rochfort, 2nd Earl of Belvedere (12 October 1738 – 13 May 1814), was an Anglo-Irish politician.

== Early years ==
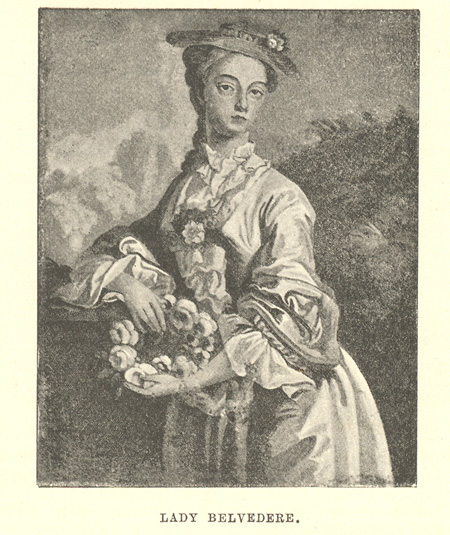
Mary Molesworth, Lady Belvedere, George's mother

Rochfort was born on 12 October 1738, son of Robert Rochfort, 1st Earl of Belvedere, and Hon. Mary Molesworth. The Rochfort family, originally called De Rupe Forti, had settled in Ireland in 1243. Sir Maurice de Rochfort was Lord Justice of Ireland in 1302. Gerald Rochfort was summoned to Parliament as a baron in 1339. George's great-grandfather was the prominent lawyer Robert Rochfort, Attorney General of Ireland and Speaker of the House of Commons in 1695, and Lord Chief Baron of the Exchequer in 1707. The family estate of Gaulstown lay on the shore of Lough Ennell in County Westmeath. (Note: Jonathan Swift was a close friend of the Rochforts of Gaulstown. It is thought that his Letter to a Very Young Lady on her Marriage (1727) was addressed to the wife of John Rochfort. Swift conceived the idea of Gulliver's Travels (1726) on Lough Ennell. The lake has a park named after the author.)

George's father, Robert Rochfort, was a favourite courtier of King George II of Great Britain. He was made an Irish peer as Baron of Bellfield in 1737, and then Earl of Belvedere in 1756. He was estranged from his mother during his childhood, after his father locked her away after an alleged affair with George's uncle, Arthur.

== Politician ==
From 1756 to 1774 George Rochfort was styled Viscount Belfield. He was Member of Parliament for Philipstown from 1758 to 1761, and Member of Parliament for Westmeath from 1761 to 1774.

The 1761 Irish general election followed the death of George II. George Rochfort, the Right Honorable Lord Belfield, won the election. He was supported by The Honorable Captain Richard Rochfort, Esq. and opposed by Mr. George Rochfort and Gustavus Lambert. The election thus seems to have been very much a family affair. Mr. George Rochfort supported the "Patriots", who demanded that parliaments last only seven years before being dissolved, rather than for the lifetime of the king, as was the custom. (Note: The 1861 Westmeath election illustrates the process followed at that time. Polling took place openly in court over an eight-day period from 11–19 May 1761. George Rochfort first declared his principles, but Lord Belfield and Captain Rochfort declined to do so. A voter could vote for more than one candidate and could be challenged before being allowed to vote. Lord Belfield and Captain Rochfort had 300 friends in town at their expense, while George Rochfort had no more than forty friends, and not at his expense. In the end, 606 voters gave 459 votes to Lord Belfield, 343 to his colleague Captain Richard Rochfort, and 259 to their opponent George Rochfort. 272 votes received objections, mostly from Mr. George Rochfort, but most objections were dismissed. Reasons for objection included want of due registry, a technicality, undue influence, insufficiency of freehold or having a papist wife, being a papist or educating his children in the papish religion.)

In 1762 George Rochfort was Sheriff of County Westmeath, and from 1772 to 1814 Governor of County Westmeath. An anonymous writer named "Dymoke" published a Review of the House of Commons in the Freeman's Journal in 1774. The purpose was to "rouse the electors of Ireland to a due exertion of their lawful powers, and stimulate them to fix on proper men to maintain their rights and privileges in parliament." He noted that Belfield, who was muster-master-general of Ireland and a Governor of the County of Westmeath, had voted for the stamp act. Dykmore declared that "The present members [Lord Belfield; Anthony Malone] for the County of WESTMEATH will never represent it again if the Electors have either sense, honour, or remembrance".

== Irish peer ==
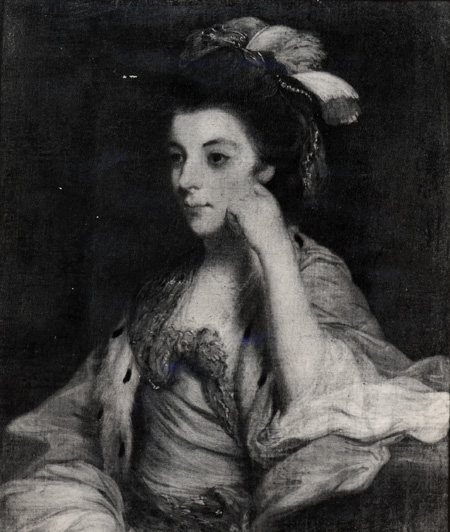
George's older sister, Jane, Lady Lanesborough

On 13 November 1774 Rochfort succeeded to the titles of Baron Belfield, Viscount Belfield and Earl of Belvedere after his father's death. He released his mother. She was prematurely aged, spoke in little more than a whisper but in a harsh, agitated and uneven manner, and was dressed in the style of thirty years earlier.

From 1775 to 1776 Rochfort was Grand Master of the Freemasons Grand Lodge of Ireland. On 20 August 1775 he married Dorothea Bloomfield, daughter of John Bloomfield and Jane Jocelyn.

George Rochfort took his mother with him when he and his new wife visited the continent, but she found the travel too difficult. They left her to recuperate in a convent in France while they visited Italy for a few months, spending the winter in Florence. The next year the couple returned to London, where George's mother stayed with a friend in Kensington Palace for a year. She then returned to Ireland and lived first with George in Dublin and then with his sister, now Countess of Lanesborough, and her young family. She died a few years after her husband. Rochfort had Belvedere House built on Great Denmark Street, Dublin, at the great sum of £24,000. The site had been owned by Nicholas Archdall. The building had been started by the first Earl, with Robert West as the architect. Rochfort and his wife apparently did not plan to complete the work, and in 1777 offered it for sale. Later they decided to complete the house for their own use, and gave the job to Michael Stapleton. It was finally completed and occupied in 1786, and probably stood alone at first, since in 1787 Rochfort was recorded as living in North Great George's Street. George's mother is thought to have died there. (Note: There are few records of Mary Rochfort's life after 1774, and she may have never seen Belvedere House in Dublin. However, the legend arose that she haunted that house. James Joyce, who grew up nearby, alluded to the story of the adultery, imprisonment and haunting in Ulysses.)

During the struggle over the Acts of Union 1800, Rochfort's position on the union of the crowns of Britain and Ireland was uncertain. A letter of 25 January 1800 from Lord Altamont to the Earl of Lucan said "Ld Belvedere has touched Government cash & possibly may not exert all his influence to give value in return for it".

Rochfort's first wife died on 6 April 1803, and on 10 November 1803, he married Jane Mackay, daughter of Reverend James Mackay. They had one son, who died in infancy. Rochfort died in Great Denmark Street, Dublin, on 13 May 1814 at the age of 75. He is buried in St Sinian, Clonfad Parish Church, of the Church of Ireland. His tomb is adorned with a full-scale neoclassical sculptural group by John Bacon the younger. It represents the earl on his death bed, with his young wife weeping at the end. He is supported by Faith and an angelic figure is beckoning him to heaven.

Rochfort had no surviving children, and his three peerages became extinct. On his death, his sister Jane inherited the whole settled part of his great estate, since his brothers had died without children. (Note: George's siblings were Jane (born 30 October 1737), Richard (2 December 1739 – 26 December 1776) and Robert (1743 – December 1772). Jane died in Florence, Italy, in July 1828 at the age of 90, leaving her estate to her grandson, the Earl of Lanesborough.) He left his entire unsettled estate to his wife. This consisted of at least 2,500 Irish acres, bringing in a large income. The fortune was passed down to his wife's children by her second marriage to Abraham Boyd. The eldest son and heir was George Augustus Boyd-Rochfort, and he assumed the arms and surname of Rochfort.

Masonic offices
Preceded by Randal MacDonnell, Viscount Dunluce	Grand Master of the Grand Lodge of Ireland; 1774–1776	Succeeded by The Earl of Mornington
Peerage of Ireland
Preceded by Robert Rochfort	Earl of Belvedere; 1774–1814	Extinct
