= Robert Rochfort, 1st Earl of Belvedere =

Anglo-Irish politician (1708-1774)

The Right Honourable The Earl of Belvedere PC
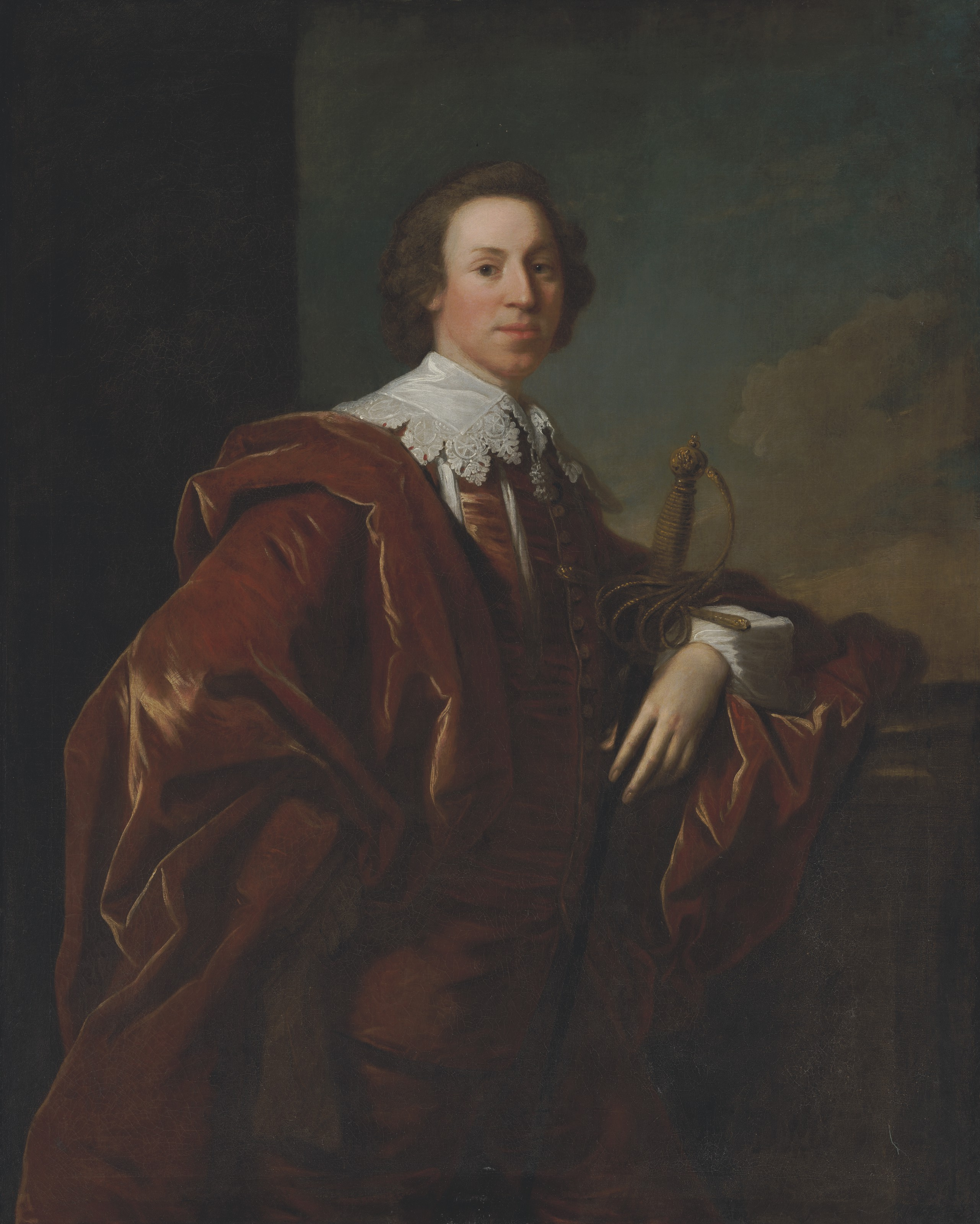
- Portrait by Robert Hunter

Member of the Irish House of Commons from Westmeath
- In office 1732–1738
- Preceded by: George Rochfort
- Succeeded by: Arthur Rochfort

Personal details
- Born: 26 March 1708
- Died: 13 November 1774 (aged 66) Mullingar, Ireland
- Cause of death: Murder; Blunt force trauma; (no definite cause of death)
- Spouse(s): Elizabeth Tenison (m. 1731; died 1732) Mary Molesworth (m. 1736, divorced)
- Children: George, Richard, Robert, and Jane
- Parent: George Rochfort

Robert Rochfort, 1st Earl of Belvedere, PC (Ire) (26 March 1708 – 13 November 1774) was an Anglo-Irish politician best known for his abusive treatment of his second wife, Mary Molesworth.

== Early life ==
He was the son of George Rochfort (son of Robert Rochfort, Chief Baron of the Irish Exchequer), and Lady Elizabeth Moore, daughter of Henry Hamilton-Moore, 3rd Earl of Drogheda. He sat in the Irish House of Commons as the Member of Parliament for County Westmeath between 1731 and 1738. On 16 March 1738, he was raised to the Peerage of Ireland as Baron Belfield and assumed his seat in the Irish House of Lords, quickly becoming a favourite in the court of George II of Great Britain.

In 1746, Belfield was challenged to a duel on account of a long-due debt of honour by Richard Herbert MP. The duel took place in the fields between Tottenham Court Road and Marylebone on Saturday 23 August 1746. Belfield was badly wounded, and Herbert received a ball in the eye which came out at the back of the skull, but nevertheless, he survived, although mentally he was never the same man again.

On 12 December 1749, he was made a member of the Privy Council of Ireland. On 5 October 1751, he was made Viscount Belfield, and he was further honoured when he was created Earl of Belvedere on 29 November 1756. Lord Belfield held the office of Muster Master-General of Ireland between 1754 and his death in 1774. He commissioned the construction of Belvedere House and Gardens in 1740.

=== Marriages and ordeals ===
He married, firstly, Elizabeth Tenison, daughter of Richard Tenison and Margaret Barton, on 16 December 1731, and she died a year later in 1732 from smallpox. He married, secondly, Hon. Mary Molesworth, daughter of Field Marshal Richard Molesworth and Jane Lucas, on 7 August 1736. Despite his fairly rapid rise at court and in politics, Rochfort is probably most well remembered for his treatment of his second wife Mary, whom he married in 1736 when he was 28 and she 16. Around 1743, he heard rumours that Mary had been unfaithful to him with his brother, Arthur. As punishment, Robert had her locked up in the family house at Gaulstown, alone apart from her servants, for the rest of his life (thirty-one years). After twelve years of this captivity, she attempted to escape but was caught and subjected to even harsher treatment. When she was finally released by order of her son after his father's death, she apparently took to wandering the house and talking to portraits as if they were real people. Her voice had assumed a peculiar quality (like a shrill whisper) and she was obviously profoundly damaged by her experience. She did not survive long after her release. She was not the only one to suffer though, as Robert took his brother Arthur to court for criminal conversation and was awarded the huge sum of £2,000 in damages. Arthur, unable to pay, fled the country, but on his return to Ireland, he was thrown into Browne's Castle (used as Dublin's debtors' prison at that time, and famous for being "the worst prison in the country") where he died. Lord Belvedere was succeeded in his titles by his eldest son from his second marriage, George Rochfort. He had two other sons, Richard and Robert, and a daughter, Jane who married firstly Brinsley Butler and secondly John King, father of Gothic writers Charlotte Dacre and Sophia Fortnum.

== Death ==
Rochfort died on 13 November 1774, aged 66. The cause of his death is not clear but some speculated that occupants of a boat came ashore to Belvedere House after crossing Lough Ennell, and murdered Rochfort in the dead of the night while others state that while on a moonlit walk, he was attacked by wild dogs; or he could have fallen and struck his head on a rock, and possibly bled to death.

Parliament of Ireland
Preceded by George Rochfort; Anthony Malone	Member of Parliament for County Westmeath; 1731 – 1738; With: Anthony Malone	Succeeded by Arthur Rochfort; Anthony Malone
Peerage of Ireland
New creation	Earl of Belvedere; 1756–1774	Succeeded by George Rochfort
New creation	Viscount Belfield; 1751–1774	Succeeded by George Rochfort
New creation	Baron Belfield; 1738–1774	Succeeded by George Rochfort
