= Richard Malone (Irish MP) =

Irish politician

Richard Malone (1706–1759) was an Irish barrister and politician. He held the office of Serjeant-at-law and sat for many years in the Irish House of Commons as member for Fore.

Malone was born at Baronston, (or Baronstown) House, Ballynacarrigy, County Westmeath, third son of Richard Malone senior and Marcella Molady, daughter of Redmond Molady of Robertstown, County Kildare and his wife Mary, who was a Malone cousin. His father was a barrister of considerable eminence, and as a young man enjoyed the personal confidence of King William III, who employed him on a number of diplomatic missions. He was a convert to the Protestant religion, while his wife is said to have adhered to the Roman Catholic faith. Richard's elder brothers were Anthony Malone and Edmond Malone. All three were barristers and each held office as Serjeant-at-law. Richard was the least distinguished of the three: he never rose to higher office, whereas Anthony became a major figure in Government, holding office as Chancellor of the Exchequer of Ireland, while Edmond became a judge of the Court of Common Pleas (Ireland).

Malone was called to the Bar in 1730, and was MP for Fore 1741–59. He became Third Serjeant in 1751 and Second Serjeant in 1757. He had hoped and expected to become First Serjeant in 1759 but was passed over, and died soon afterwards. He was beset in his last years by financial worries as well as professional disappointment: he died £10000 in debt, although the Serjeant's salary, and the various perquisites attached to it, should have made him a wealthy man. A senior judge said cynically that Malone's financial misfortune meant that ambitious lawyers would no longer be attracted to the office of Second Serjeant.

Malone married his second cousin Anne Malone, daughter of Henry Malone of County Offaly and Margaret L'Estrange, and had eight children.

== Sources ==
- Ball, F. Elrington The Judges in Ireland 1221-1921 London John Murray 1926
- Debrett's Peerage Third Edition London 1790
- Hart, A.R. History of the King's Serjeants at law in Ireland Four Courts Press Dublin 2000
