= Robert Rochfort =

Irish politician (1652–1727)

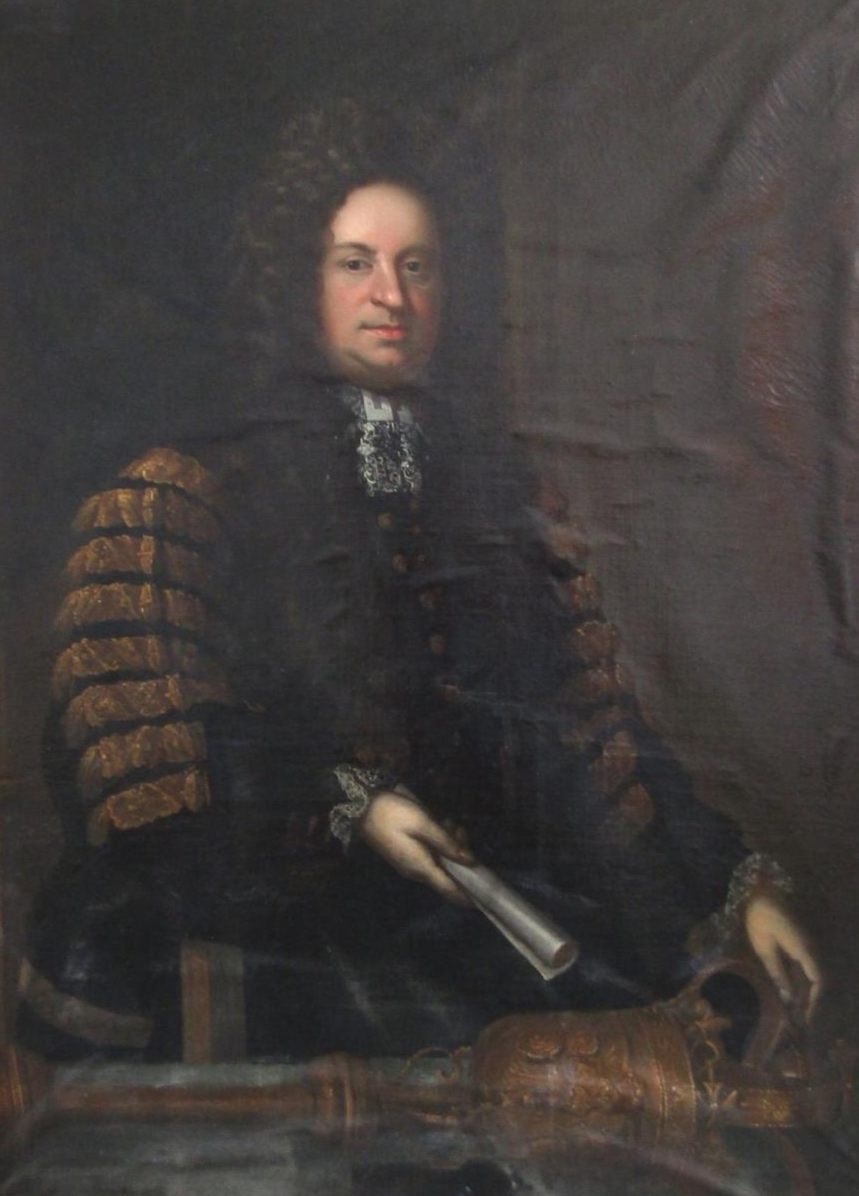
- Portrait of Rochfort
- Born: 9 December 1652
- Died: 10 October 1727 (aged 74)
- Occupations: lawyer, politician and judge
- Known for: Attorney General for Ireland, Chief Baron of the Irish Exchequer, Speaker of the Irish House of Commons
- Spouse: Hannah Handcock
- Children: George Rochfort; John Rochfort
- Parents: James Rochfort (father); Thomasina Pigott (mother)

Robert Rochfort (9 December 1652 – 10 October 1727) was an Irish lawyer, politician and judge of the late seventeenth and early eighteenth centuries. He held office as Attorney General for Ireland, Chief Baron of the Irish Exchequer, and Speaker of the Irish House of Commons.

== Early life ==
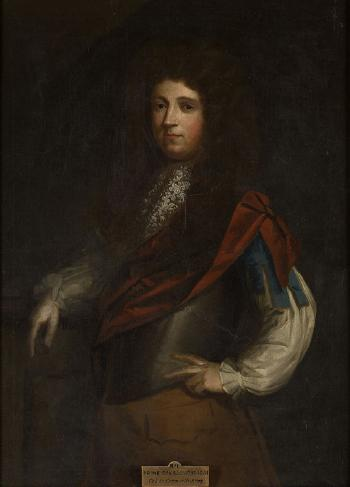
Robert's father James Rochfort, usually known by his nickname Prime Iron

Rochfort was born 9 December 1652, the second son of Lt.-Col. James (nick-named "Prime-Iron") Rochfort (d. 1652), a Cromwellian soldier, and his wife Thomasina (née Pigott) Hull, daughter of Sir Robert Pigott of Dysart Manor, County Laois, and widow of Argentine Hull of Leamcon, County Cork. Robert was born posthumously: his father, who had fatally wounded one Major Turner in a duel, was court-martialled and executed for murder a few months before Robert's birth. His mother made a third marriage to George Peyton of Streamstown, County Roscommon, who was her distant cousin through her mother Thomasina Peyton, second wife of Sir Robert Pigott.

The Rochfort family is recorded in Ireland from 1243. They acquired substantial lands in Meath, Westmeath and Kildare. Robert was descended from Sir Milo de Rochfort (died after 1309). His father was the younger son of James Rochfort of Agherry, County Wicklow and his wife Catherine Sarsfield.

== Career ==
Rochfort initially pursued a successful legal career in Ireland before going on to attain high government office. In 1680 he was appointed Recorder of Derry, a post which he held until 1707.

=== Political career ===
Between 1692 and 1707, Rochfort represented County Westmeath in the Irish House of Commons. He supported the 'whiggish' elements in the House at this time in their claim to possess the 'sole right' to legislate for Ireland. This was both a challenge to Poynings' Law and the Irish executive, leading to a constitutional crisis, resolved by a compromise in the parliamentary session of 1695. Rochfort was, nonetheless, appointed Attorney-General in 1694 with the help of the Whig Lord Justice, Lord Capell. With the executive's support, he was elected Speaker of the Irish House of Commons the same year. He remained in this position until 1699.

He played a key role in the impeachment of the Lord Chancellor of Ireland, Sir Charles Porter, on charges of judicial misconduct in 1695. The impeachment collapsed after Porter's brilliant speech in his own defence. Disappointment, and a keen sense of his own dignity, led Rochfort to start a quarrel the night after Porter's acquittal: seeing the Lord Chancellor's coach trying to precede his, he jumped down and tried to physically restrain Porter's coachman. The Irish House of Lords next day rebuked the Commons over the affair. The Commons replied that the affair had been a misunderstanding, and that Rochfort, it being a very dark winter night, had not recognised Porter (the streets of Dublin were in fact notoriously dark and badly lit in that era). The matter was allowed to drop.

=== Later years ===
Meanwhile, Rochfort began to demonstrate Tory sympathies: from 1703 he became identifiable as one of the government's leading parliamentary managers. He became Chief Baron of the Exchequer in 1707. He remained in this position until 1714, when, on the death of Anne, Queen of Great Britain, along with almost all his colleagues on the Bench, he was dismissed from office on account of his political sympathies. Rochfort now returned to his practice at the Irish Bar.

== Personal life ==
Robert married Hannah Handcock, daughter of William Handcock, MP for County Westmeath and his wife Abigail Stanley, daughter of Sir Thomas Stanley and Mary Hammond, and sister of the writer Thomas Stanley. Together, they had two sons:

- George Rochfort (1682–1730), who married Lady Elizabeth Moore, a daughter of Henry Hamilton-Moore, 3rd Earl of Drogheda and Mary Cole.
- John Rochfort, who married Deborah Staunton in 1722; he moved to Clogrennane, County Carlow.

Rochfort died on 10 October 1727.

=== Descendants ===
Through his eldest son, he was a grandfather of Robert Rochfort, who was raised to the Irish peerage in 1737 as Baron Belfield and made Earl of Belvedere in 1757.

Parliament of Ireland
Preceded by Patriot Parliament	Member of Parliament for County Westmeath; 1692–1707; With: Dillon Pollard 1692–1695; George Peyton 1695–1703; William Handcock 1703–1707; George Rochfort 1707	Succeeded by George Rochfort; John Cooke
Political offices
Preceded by Richard Levinge	Speaker of the Irish House of Commons; 1695–1699	Succeeded by Alan Brodrick
Legal offices
Preceded by John Temple	Attorney-General for Ireland; 1695-1707	Succeeded by Alan Brodrick
