= Chapman baronets of Killua Castle (1782) =

Extinct baronetcy

Escutcheon of the Chapman baronets of Killua Castle

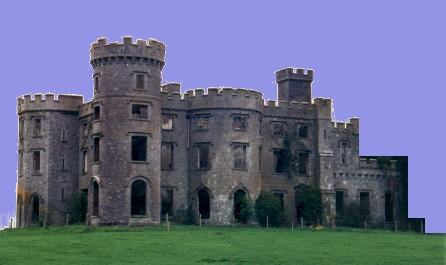
Ruins of Killua Castle, the former seat of the Chapman baronets

The Chapman Baronetcy, of Killua Castle (also known as St Lucy's) in the County of Westmeath, was created in the Baronetage of Ireland on 11 March 1782 for Benjamin Chapman, with special remainder to his younger brother Thomas. Chapman notably represented Fore and County Westmeath in the Irish House of Commons.

He was succeeded according to the special remainder by his brother Thomas, the 2nd Baronet. His elder son, the 3rd Baronet, sat as Member of Parliament for County Westmeath. He never married and was succeeded by his younger brother, the 4th Baronet. He also represented County Westmeath in Parliament and served as Lord Lieutenant of County Westmeath.

== Chapman baronets of Killua Castle (1782) ==
- Sir Benjamin Chapman, 1st Baronet (died 1810)
- Sir Thomas Chapman, 2nd Baronet (1756–1837)
- Sir Montagu Lowther Chapman, 3rd Baronet (1808–1852)
- Sir Benjamin James Chapman, 4th Baronet (1810–1888)
- Sir Montagu Richard Chapman, 5th Baronet (1853–1907)
- Sir Benjamin Rupert Chapman, 6th Baronet (1865–1914)
- Sir Thomas Robert Tighe Chapman, 7th Baronet (1846–1919)

== 7th Baronet ==
The title became extinct on the death of the 7th Baronet in 1919; his brother Francis Vansittart Chapman, heir presumptive, had died in 1915. Killua Castle passed to the Fetherstonhaugh family, and was later dismantled.

The 7th Baronet Thomas Robert Tighe Chapman did not use the title, when he inherited it in 1914. He had married a cousin Elizabeth Sarah Hamilton or Boyd in 1873; the couple had four daughters. The family home South Hill was near Delvin, to which Chapman brought a young governess around the late 1870s.

The subsequent episode of family history was first brought to light by the French author Léon Boussard, in a book from 1941. It was more widely publicised by Richard Aldington in Lawrence of Arabia: a Biographical Enquiry (1955). Chapman abandoned his wife to live with his daughters' governess, Sarah Junner; the couple did not marry. They had five illegitimate sons, of whom Thomas Edward Lawrence, best known as "Lawrence of Arabia", was the second. Aldington attributed the cover-up of illegitimacy, and other perceived falsifications in Lawrence's biography, to Lawrence himself and his friend Ronald Storrs. Storrs's 1949 biography of Lawrence had referred to "Thomas Robert Chapman (who had assumed the name of Lawrence)" and "His mother, Sarah Maden, the daughter of a Sunderland engineer".
