= Ben Chapman =

Ben Chapman may refer to:

- Benjamin Chapman (1621–?), soldier
- Sir Benjamin Chapman, 1st Baronet, of the Chapman baronets, MP for Westmeath and Fore
- Sir Benjamin Chapman, 4th Baronet (1810–1888), Irish Whig politician and barrister
- Ben Chapman (actor) (1928–2008), American actor
- Ben Chapman (baseball) (1908–1993), American baseball player
- Ben Chapman (footballer, born 1979), English football player
- Ben Chapman (footballer, born 1991), British Virgin Islands goalkeeper
- Ben Chapman (footballer, born 1998), English footballer
- Ben Chapman (politician) (born 1940), British Labour Member of Parliament

== See also ==
- Chapman (surname)
