= Sir Thomas Chapman, 7th Baronet =

Anglo-Irish Baronet (1846–1919)

Sir Thomas Chapman Bt
- Born: 6 November 1846; Southill, County Westmeath
- Died: 8 April 1919 (aged 72); Oxford, Oxfordshire
- Other name: Thomas Robert Lawrence
- Title: Chapman Baronet
- Predecessor: Sir Benjamin Rupert Chapman
- Spouse: Edith Sarah Hamilton
- Partner: Sarah Lawrence
- Children: 9, including Thomas Edward Lawrence and Arnold Walter Lawrence

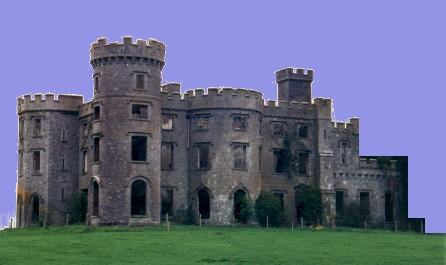
Ruins of Killua Castle, former seat of the Chapman baronets

Sir Thomas Robert Tighe Chapman, 7th Baronet (6 November 1846 – 8 April 1919) was an Anglo-Irish landowner, the last of the Chapman baronets of Killua Castle in County Westmeath, Ireland. For many years he lived under the name of Thomas Robert Lawrence, taking the name of his partner, Sarah Lawrence, the mother of his five sons, one of whom was T. E. Lawrence, also known as "Lawrence of Arabia".

== Early life and background ==
Thomas Chapman was born in Southill, Westmeath, Ireland in 1846, the second of the three sons of William Chapman (who was the son of Sir Thomas Chapman, 2nd Baronet of Kilua) and Louisa Vansittart, the daughter of Colonel Arthur Vansittart of Shottesbrooke.

The family belonged to the Anglo-Irish landowning class and for generations its members had married into families of a similar standing in England and Ireland. With regard to the family's origins, Debrett's Baronetage (1918) commented:

John Chapman, and his brother William, through the influence of Sir Walter Raleigh, their cousin-german, received large grants of land in Ireland, and settled in that country. Benjamin, the son of William Chapman, was an officer of cavalry in Cromwell's army, and for his services received the castle and estates of Killua, sometime the seat of the family. The 3rd baronet sat as M.P. for Westmeath ... Sir Benjamin James, 4th baronet, sat as M.P. for Westmeath ... 1841–7 and was Lord-Lieutenant of that county. The 5th baronet, Sir Montagu Richard, was High Sheriff of County Westmeath.

Thomas Chapman was brought up to lead the life of a country gentleman, at a house called South Hill, near the village of Delvin, County Westmeath, Ireland, a modest property of some 170 acres, and also at the family's town house in Dublin. He was educated in England, at Eton College.

== Life ==
As a younger son, it was expected that Chapman would run, rather than own, the family's estates, and from 1866 to 1868 he learnt about estate management at the Royal Agricultural College, Cirencester. However, his elder brother, William Eden Chapman (born 1844), an officer in the 15th Hussars, died in May 1870, leaving Chapman as the heir. The third brother, Francis Vansittart Chapman, was then trained to manage the estates.

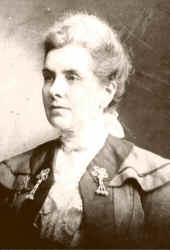
Sarah Lawrence

On 24 July 1873, Chapman married Edith Sarah Hamilton (born c. 1847), daughter of George Augustus Rochfort-Boyd, JP, DL, of Middleton Park, County Westmeath, and they had four daughters, Eva Jane Louisa (born 1874), Rose Isabel (born 1878), Florence Livia (born 1880) and Mabel Cecele (born 1881).

In the late 1870s, the Chapmans took on as a governess a capable and cheerful young woman named Sarah Lawrence. By this time, Edith Chapman had become zealously religious, subjecting members of her household to frequent prayer meetings and disapproving of many of their pleasures, while Chapman himself had become a heavy drinker. He fell in love with Sarah Lawrence, who was younger than he by some fifteen years. One of Chapman's daughters later recalled that her father usually had a dour manner, but whenever Sarah Lawrence entered a room, he became "all gay". Lawrence, who had been born on 31 August 1861 in Sunderland, County Durham, had been registered at birth under the surname of her unmarried mother, Elizabeth Junner, who at the time was working as a servant in the house of Thomas Lawrence, a Lloyd's surveyor, whose son John Lawrence is thought to be Sarah Lawrence's father.

In 1885, Lawrence became pregnant. She went to live in rooms in Dublin which Chapman found for her, and in December 1885 a son was born and christened Montagu Robert. Chapman stayed with his wife, while still seeing Lawrence and his son, until Edith Chapman found out what had happened (the Chapmans' butler, while in a Dublin grocer's shop, heard a young woman give her name as Mrs Thomas Chapman – he recognised the woman as Sarah Lawrence). He then left his wife to live with Lawrence. He took her to live at Tremadog, Carnarvonshire (now Gwynedd), North Wales, and their second illegitimate son, christened Thomas Edward and later famous as 'Lawrence of Arabia', was born there in August 1888.

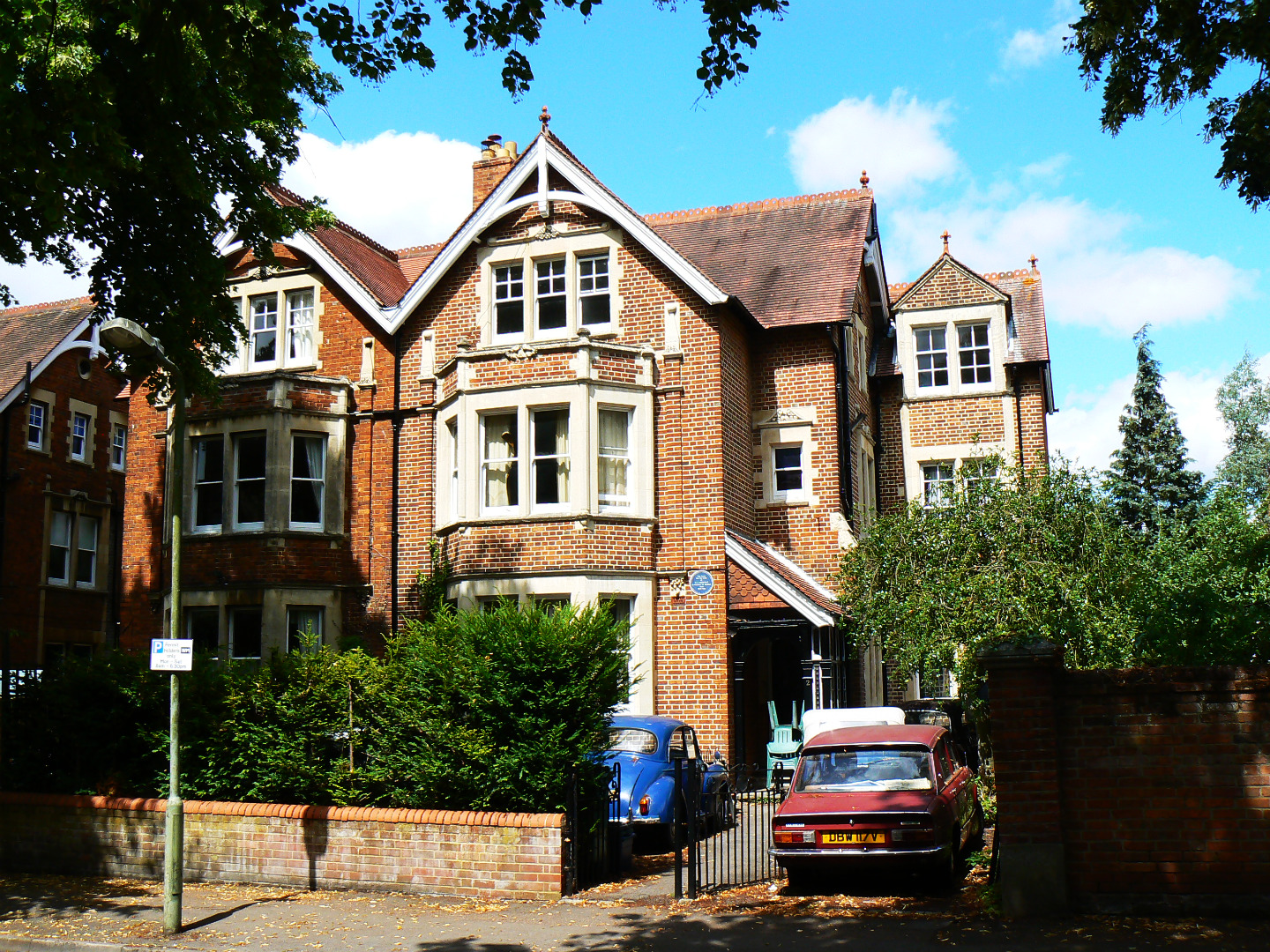
The Lawrence family lived at 2 Polstead Road, Oxford from 1896 to 1921

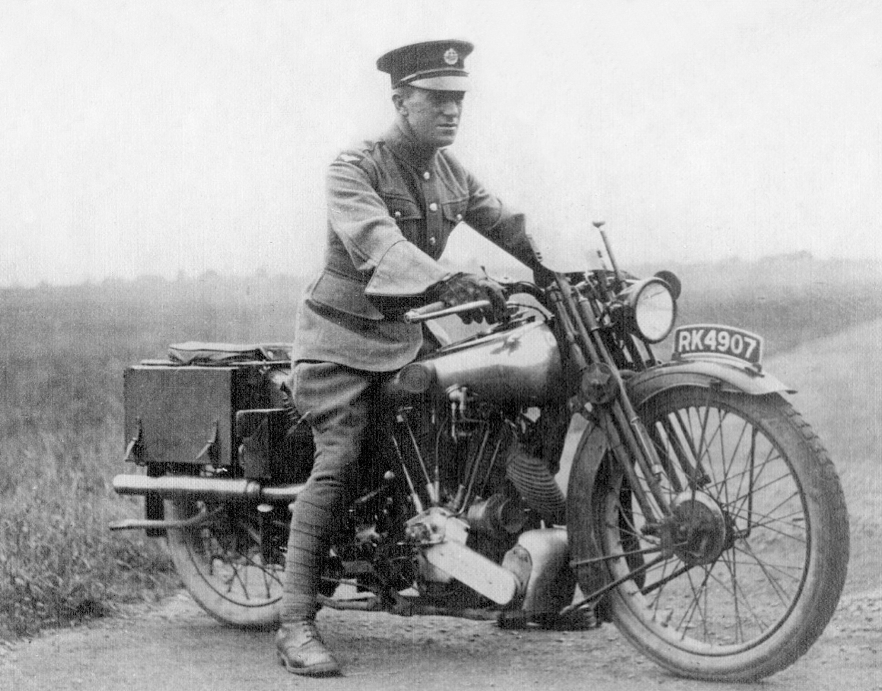
T. E. Lawrence

The couple stayed only a short time in Tremadog, and soon moved on, to Kirkcudbright in the Stewartry of Kirkcudbright in Scotland, then to Dinard in Brittany, the Isle of Wight, and the New Forest, choosing places where their English neighbours were unlikely to recognise him. They had nine children altogether, but three of them died young, leaving five sons and a daughter who survived infancy. In 1896, still unmarried and going under the name of Mr and Mrs Lawrence, the couple arrived in Polstead Road, Oxford. The purpose of this move was largely to enable them to educate their sons, despite their limited means.

Chapman lived a life of leisure and spent much of his time with his sons. He was a photographer, hunted, spoke good French, was interested in medieval architecture, taught his sons carpentry, and even in old age would quote from Homer and Horace. He bought smart new bicycles and liked to cycle long distances.

In 1914, Chapman succeeded his cousin Sir Benjamin Rupert Chapman, 6th Baronet (1865–1914), to the baronetcy. He died on 8 April 1919 in Oxford and was buried at Wolvercote Cemetery. As he left no legitimate male heirs, the Chapman Baronetcy of Killua Castle became extinct.

Chapman's son T. E. Lawrence had already become world-famous, following the Arab Revolt of 1916. Another of his surviving sons, A. W. Lawrence (1900–1991) became notable as an archaeologist and art historian.

=== Money affairs in exile ===
On 30 March 1888, Chapman assigned his life interest in his father's estates to his younger brother Francis Chapman, in exchange for a life annuity of £200 (equivalent to £22,000 in 2025). Their father, William Chapman, died in 1889, leaving the bulk of his property to his son Francis. However, Chapman also had (or later inherited) some capital, which by 1916 was more than £20,000, producing at the time an annual income of some £1,000, a substantial figure.

Chapman (otherwise Mr Lawrence) was probably disappointed when his brother Francis died unmarried in 1915, leaving him only £25,000 of his estate of £120,296, with £10,000 going to the Adelaide Hospital in Dublin and £25,000 being shared by Chapman's legitimate offspring, his four daughters, who were also the residuary legatees. When Chapman (Lawrence) received the £25,000, he shared part of it out among his sons.

Chapman had a sister, Caroline Margaret Chapman, who in 1894 married her cousin, Montagu Chapman, later the fifth Chapman baronet, and Sir Montagu died childless in 1907. In 1911, his widow made a will which divided the Killua estate, leaving £20,000 to her brother, Chapman, and separate large amounts to his four daughters. However, when she died in 1920, the £20,000 went to the daughters, as her residuary legatees, as Chapman had himself died a few months before and she had not specified that the bequest was to go elsewhere in that event. The loss of the £20,000 may explain the bitterness of an allusion to the Chapmans which T. E. Lawrence added to Liddell Hart's biography of him: "The father's family seemed unconscious of his sons, even when after his death recognition of their achievement might have done honour to the name."

What was left of the family's land in Ireland was sold in 1949 and then came to some 1,230 acres (5.0 km^{2}).

== Descendants ==
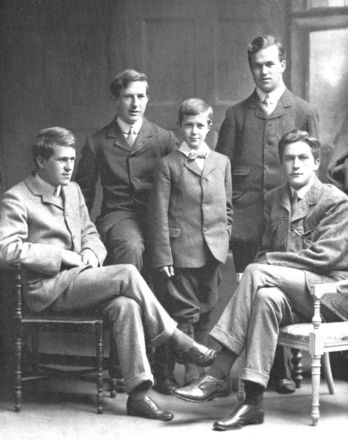
The Lawrence brothers in 1910: from left to right: Thomas Edward (Ned), Frank, Arnold, Bob and Will

Chapman had four daughters: Eva Jane Louisa (born 1874); Rose Isabel (born 1878); Florence Lina (born 1880) and Mabel Cecele (born 1881).

Chapman's eldest son, Montagu Robert Lawrence (1885–1971), became a physician and was a medical missionary in China.

His second son, Colonel Thomas Edward Lawrence, died childless in a motorcycle accident in 1935, while his third and fourth sons, William George Lawrence (1889–1915) and Frank Helier Lawrence (1893–1915), also childless, were killed during the First World War. Second Lieutenant William George Lawrence died on 23 October 1915 while serving with the 13th Sqdn. Royal Flying Corps and the Oxford and Bucks Light Infantry; he is buried at St Souplet British Cemetery. Second Lieutenant Frank Helier Lawrence died on 9 May 1915 while serving with the 3rd Bn. attd. 1st Bn. Gloucestershire Regiment; he is commemorated on the Le Touret Memorial.

His fifth son, Arnold Walter Lawrence (1900–1991), married Barbara Thompson in 1925 and had one child, Jane Helen Thera Lawrence. In 1947, she married James Macdonald Cassels, who became Lyon Jones Professor of Physics in the University of Liverpool in 1960, and they had two children.

Sarah Lawrence died in 1959, aged 98, in the Acland Nursing Home, Oxford.

== Notes ==
Baronetage of Ireland
Preceded by Benjamin Chapman	Baronet (of Killua Castle); 1914–1919	Extinct
