= Levinge =

Levinge may refer to:

- Levinge Baronets
- Richard Levinge: several, including
  - Sir Richard Levinge, 1st Baronet (1656–1724) Speaker of the Irish House of Commons, also sat in the English House of Commons, and Commons of Great Britain
  - Sir Richard Levinge, 2nd Baronet (c1690–1748) Irish landowner and politician, MP for Westmeath 1723–27 and for Blessington 1727–48
  - Richard Levinge (1724–1783), Irish politician, MP for Duleek 1768-76
  - Sir Richard Levinge, 7th Baronet (1811–1884), Irish landowner and politician, MP for Westmeath 1857–65
- Edward Levinge
