= Tuite =

Tuite is a surname. Notable people with the surname include:

- Gerry Tuite (1910–1990), Australian rules footballer
- Hugh Morgan Tuite (1795–1868), Irish politician
- James Tuite (1849–1916), Irish watchmaker and politician
- Jerry Tuite (1966–2003), American professional wrestler
- Kevin Tuite (born 1954), Irish-Canadian anthropologist
- Marjorie Tuite (1922–1986), American Roman Catholic nun and activist
- Peter Tuite (born 1976), Irish classical concert pianist and pedagogue

== See also ==
- Tuite baronets, in the baronetage of Ireland
