= High Sheriff of Westmeath =

The High Sheriff of Westmeath was the British Crown's judicial representative in County Westmeath, Ireland from its creation under The Counties of Meath and Westmeath Act 1543 until 1922, when the office was abolished in the new Free State and replaced by the office of Westmeath County Sheriff. The sheriff had judicial, electoral, ceremonial and administrative functions and executed High Court Writs. In 1908, an Order in Council made the Lord-Lieutenant the Sovereign's prime representative in a county and reduced the High Sheriff's precedence. However the sheriff retained his responsibilities for the preservation of law and order in the county. The usual procedure for appointing the sheriff from 1660 onwards was that three persons were nominated at the beginning of each year from the county and the Lord Lieutenant then appointed his choice as High Sheriff for the remainder of the year. Often the other nominees were appointed as under-sheriffs. Sometimes a sheriff did not fulfil his entire term through death or other event and another sheriff was then appointed for the remainder of the year. The dates given hereunder are the dates of appointment. The following is an incomplete list: all addresses are in County Westmeath unless stated otherwise.

== High Sheriffs of County Westmeath ==
- 1543: Robert Dillon
- 1557: Sir Oliver Nugent
- 1558: Sir Thomas le Strange
- 1572–1573: Thomas Nugent
- 1574: Thomas mac Riccard Tute of Sonnagh
- 1606–1612: Sir Edmund Fettiplace
- 1642: Edward Tuite, of Tuitestown (killed in battle, 1642)
- 1655: James Shaen
- 1661: Ridgeley Hatfield
- 1663: Charles Lyons
- 1677: Sir Edward Tyrrell
- 1692: Walter Pollard, jnr
- 1698: Ralph Elrington, of Killeenbrack

== Anne, 1702–1714 ==
- 1703: Edward Bertles
- 1705: Thomas Magan, of Togherstown
- 1709: Richard Plummer

== George I, 1714–1727 ==
- 1715: Thomas Judge, of Grangebegg
- 1718: Arthur Reynell, of Castle Reynell
- 1720: Richard Berry, of Wardenstown
- 1721: Arthur Judge, of Bishopstone and later of Mosstown
- 1727: Arthur Reynell, of Castle Reynell

== George II, 1727–1760 ==
- 1728: Hon. Humphrey Butler of Belturbet
- 1729: Herbert Price
- 1729: Major Charles Hampson (died 1729)
- 1730: Herbert Price
- 1731: Charles Lyons of Ledeston Hall
- 1732: Hugh Wilton
- 1733: Sir Henry Tuite, 6th Baronet of Sonagh
- 1734: William Handcock
- 1735: John Gay
- 1736: Judge Rochfort
- 1737: William Sherlock
- 1738: Henry Pilkington, of Tore
- 1739: Ebenezer Lowe
- 1740: Nicholas Ogle
- 1741: Thomas Pakenham
- 1742: Edmond Hill
- 1743: Robert Cooke
- 1744: Isaac Smith
- 1745: Edmond Reynell
- 1746: Thomas Smyth, of Drumcree
- 1747: Hans Widman Wood, of Rosmead
- 1748: John Smith
- 1748: John Meares, of Meares Court
- 1749: Edward Magan
- 1750: Arthur Judge
- 1751: Benjamin Chapman
- 1752: Morgan Daly
- 1753: Duke Tyrrell
- 1754: Hugh Maguire
- 1755: Samuel Lowe
- 1756: Edmond Malone, of Baronston
- 1757: Edmond Malone, of Baronston
- 1758: John Nugent
- 1759: Arthur Magan, of Clonearl
- 1760: Richard Sterne Tighe

== George III, 1760–1820 ==
- 1761: Thomas Adderly
- 1762: Hon. George Augustus Rochfort, Lord Belfield (later 2nd Earl of Belvedere)
- 1763: Brinsley Butler, Hon. Lord Newtown
- 1764: Sir Richard Levinge, 4th Baronet
- 1765: Hon. Richard Rochfort Mervyn
- 1766: Ralph Smith
- 1767: Joseph Daly
- 1768: Daniel Chenevix
- 1769: George Boleyn Whitney
- 1770: William Smyth, of Fieldstown
- 1771: Thomas Fetherstonhaugh
- 1772: George Paul Monk
- 1773: Peter Delemar
- 1774: Sir William Pigot Piers, 5th Baronet
- 1775: George Tyrrell
- 1776: Robert Hodson, 1st Baronet. of Tuitestown (now Greenpark)
- 1777: Hon. Robert Rochfort
- 1778: John Lyons of Ledeston Hall
- 1779: John Reynell
- 1780: Richard Malone
- 1781: Cuthbert Fetherstonhaugh, of Mosstown
- 1782: William Fetherstonhaugh
- 1783: John Meares, of Meares Court
- 1784: James Fetherstonhaugh, of Bracklyn Castle
- 1785: Hon. Robert Moore
- 1786: Henry Widman Wood
- 1787: Philip Batty
- 1788: Henry Purdon
- 1789: Mark Synnott (died 1789) and replaced by James Caulfield Browne
- 1790: Ralph Smyth, of Gaybrook
- 1791: Sir Charles Levinge, 5th Baronet
- 1792: Thomas Hutchinson Smyth
- 1793: William Smyth, of Barbavilla
- 1794: Sterne Tighe, of Carrick
- 1795: Henry Cope
- 1796: Gustavus Hume Rochfort, of Rochfort
- 1797: Maurice Nugent O'Connor, of Mount Pleasant
- 1798: Dillon Pollard
- 1799: James Nugent, of Clonlost
- 1800: Edward John Briscoe, of Riverdale
- 1801: Thomas Fitzgerald Nugent
- 1802: Alexander Murray
- 1803: Joseph Morgan Daly
- 1804: Henry Daniel
- 1805: Theobald Fetherstonhaugh, of Mosstown
- 1806: Robert Cooke
- 1807: James Gibbons
- 1808: Sir Richard Levinge, 6th Baronet
- 1809: George Purdon
- 1810: Walter Nugent
- 1811: Robert Purdon
- 1812: William Dutton Pollard, of Kinturk and Castle Pollard
- 1813: Ralph Smyth, of Glananea
- 1814: John Middleton Berry, of Middleton
- 1815: Robert Handcock Temple, of Waterstown
- 1816: John Charles Lyons of Ledeston Hall
- 1817: James Gibbons, jnr
- 1818: Peter Purdon
- 1819: Richard M. Reynell
- 1820: William Henry Magan

== George IV, 1820–1830 ==
- 1821: Richard Handcock, Junior
- 1822: Hugh Morgan Tuite, later of Sonna
- 1823: Robert Smyth, of Drumcree
- 1824: Thomas James Fetherstonhaugh, of Bracklyn Castle
- 1825: Anthony J. Doppling, of Lowtown
- 1826: Thomas Shugburgh Whitney, of Newpass
- 1827: Sir Robert Arair Hodson, 2nd Bt., of Holybrooke House, co. Wicklow
- 1828: Daniel or David James Hearne
- 1829: Gustavus Lambert
- 1830: Robert Smyth, of Gaybrook

== William IV, 1830–1837 ==
- 1831: Hon. Augustus Caulfeild Browne
- 1832: William Barlow Smythe, of Barbavilla
- 1833: Edward Briscoe, of Grangemore
- 1834: R. W. Cooper
- 1835: Sir Percy Fitzgerald Nugent, 1st Bt., of Donore
- 1836: William Chapman of Killua Casle, Athboy
- 1837: John Ennis

== Victoria, 1837–1901 ==
- 1838: James Nugent, Count of Holy Roman Empire
- 1839: Richard Winter Reynell, of Killynon
- 1840: William Pollard, of Kinturk
- 1841: Cuthbert Fetherstonhaugh, of Mosstown
- 1842: Hercules Robinson, R.N., of Rosmead
- 1843: George Augustus Boyd, of Middleton Park House
- 1844: Sir Montague Lowther Chapman, 3rd Bt., of Killua Castle
- 1845: Hon. Laurence Harman King-Harman, of Newcastle
- 1846: Hon. Laurence Harman King-Harman and Sir George Frederick John Hodson, 3rd Bt., of Holybrooke House, co. Wicklow
- 1847: Richard Steel Fetherston-Haugh
- 1848: James William Middleton Barry, of Ballinagall, Mullingar
- 1849: Lt-Col. John Caulfeild, of Bloomfield
- 1850: Sir John Hugh Nugent, 3rd Bt., of Ballinlough
- 1851: Sir Richard George Augustus Levinge, 7th Bt.
- 1852: John Richard Malone, of Baronston
- 1853: Charles Brinsley Marlay (later Rochfort), of Belvedere
- 1854: Sir Francis Hopkins, 2nd Bt., of Athboy
- 1855: John James Nugent
- 1856: Sir Benjamin James Chapman, 4th Bt., of Killua Castle
- 1857: Howard Fetherstonhaugh, of Bracklyn Castle
- 1858: Thomas James Smyth, of Ballynegall
- 1859: John Longworth, of Glynwood
- 1860: Hon. Robert Reginald Temple Harris
- 1861: Hon. Henry William Parnell, later 3rd Baron Congleton
- 1862: John Devenish Meares, of Meares Court, Moyvore
- 1863:
- 1864: John Wilson, of Daramona House
- 1865:
- 1866: John James Ennis (later 2nd Bt.), of Ballinahown Court, Athlone.
- 1867: Francis Hume Kelly, of Glencara
- 1868: Joseph Tuite, of Sonna.
- 1869:
- 1870: Hon. Francis William Browne, of Galston Park, Killican. (later 4th Baron Kilmaine)
- 1871: Hon. George Mostyn.
- 1872: George Nugent Purdon, of Lisnabin.
- 1872: Hon. Sir Leicester Curzon Smyth.
- 1873: Walter William Dutton Pollard-Urquhart, of Castle Pollard.
- 1874: James Corry Jones Lowry, of Rockdale.
- 1875: Joshua Harry Cooper.
- 1876: Major Rochfort Hamilton Boyd-Rochfort, of Middleton Park, Castletown.
- 1877: William Benjamin Digby, of Ballincurra.
- 1878: William Edward Smyth, of Glananea.
- 1879:
- 1880: Captain Crofton Thomas Burton Vandeleur, of Wordenstown.
- 1881: Henry Loftus Lewis, of Violetstown.
- 1882: Francis Travers Dames-Longworth, Q.C., of Glynwood.
- 1883: Charles Kelly, of Lunestown.
- 1884: Hon. Patrick Emilius John Greville-Nugent, of Clonyn Castle
- 1885: William Lewis Devenish-Meares, of Meares Court.
- 1886: Harry Corbyn Levinge, of Knockdrin Castle.
- 1887: Henry Ernest William Fetherstonhaugh-Whitney, of Newpass.
- 1888: William Lyster Smythe.
- 1889: Sir Montagu Richard Chapman, 5th Bt., of Killua Castle
- 1890: Cecil Howard Digby Fetherstonhaugh, of Bracklyn Castle.
- 1891: Francis Vansittart Chapman
- 1892: Col. James Smyth, of Gaybrook.
- 1893: William Evans Esq, Gillardstown, Killucan.
- 1894: William Edward Wilson, FRS, of Daramona.
- 1895: William Bury Homan-Mulock.
- 1896: Col. John Richard Malone, of Baronston.
- 1897: Henry Arthur Shuckburgh Upton, of Coolatore, Moate.(1870–1947)
- 1898:
- 1899: Captain the Hon. Ronald Fulke Greville.
- 1900: Edward Travers Dames-Longworth, of Glynwood
- 1901: Lt-Col. Francis Edward Romulus Pollard-Urquhart, of Castle Pollard

== Edward VII, 1901–1910 ==
- 1902: Richard William Winter Bayley, of Ballinderry.
- 1903: Edward Kenrick Bunbury Tighe.
- 1904: George Arthur Boyd-Rochfort, of Middleton Park.
- 1905: John David Fetherstonhaugh, of Rockview.
- 1906: Charles Brinsley Marlay (later Rochfort), of Belvedere.
- 1907: Hugh Ponsonby Wilson, of Coolure.
- 1908: Sir Richard William Levinge, 10th Bt.
- 1909: Major Gerald Dease, Turbotston.
- 1910: Gustavus Rochfort Wade (later Hyde), of Lynnbury.

== George V, 1910–1922 ==
- 1911: John Granville Wilson, of Daramona House.
- 1912: Joseph Leycester Devenish-Meares, of Meares Court.
- 1913: Robert Wolfe Smyth, of Portlick Castle.
- 1914:
- 1915: Henry Maurice Tuite, of Sonna.
- 1916: Col. Edward Winter Purdon-Winter, of Lisnabin.
- 1917: Major Thomas Gibbons Hawkesworth Smyth, of Ballynegall.
- 1918: Henry Maxwell Smyth, of Drumcree House.
- 1919: Captain Percy Philip O'Reilly, of Colamber.
- 1920: Major Patrick Henry Augustus O'Hara, of Mornington.
- 1921:
- 1922: Sir Walter Richard Nugent, 4th Bt.
