= Reginald Thomas John Levinge =

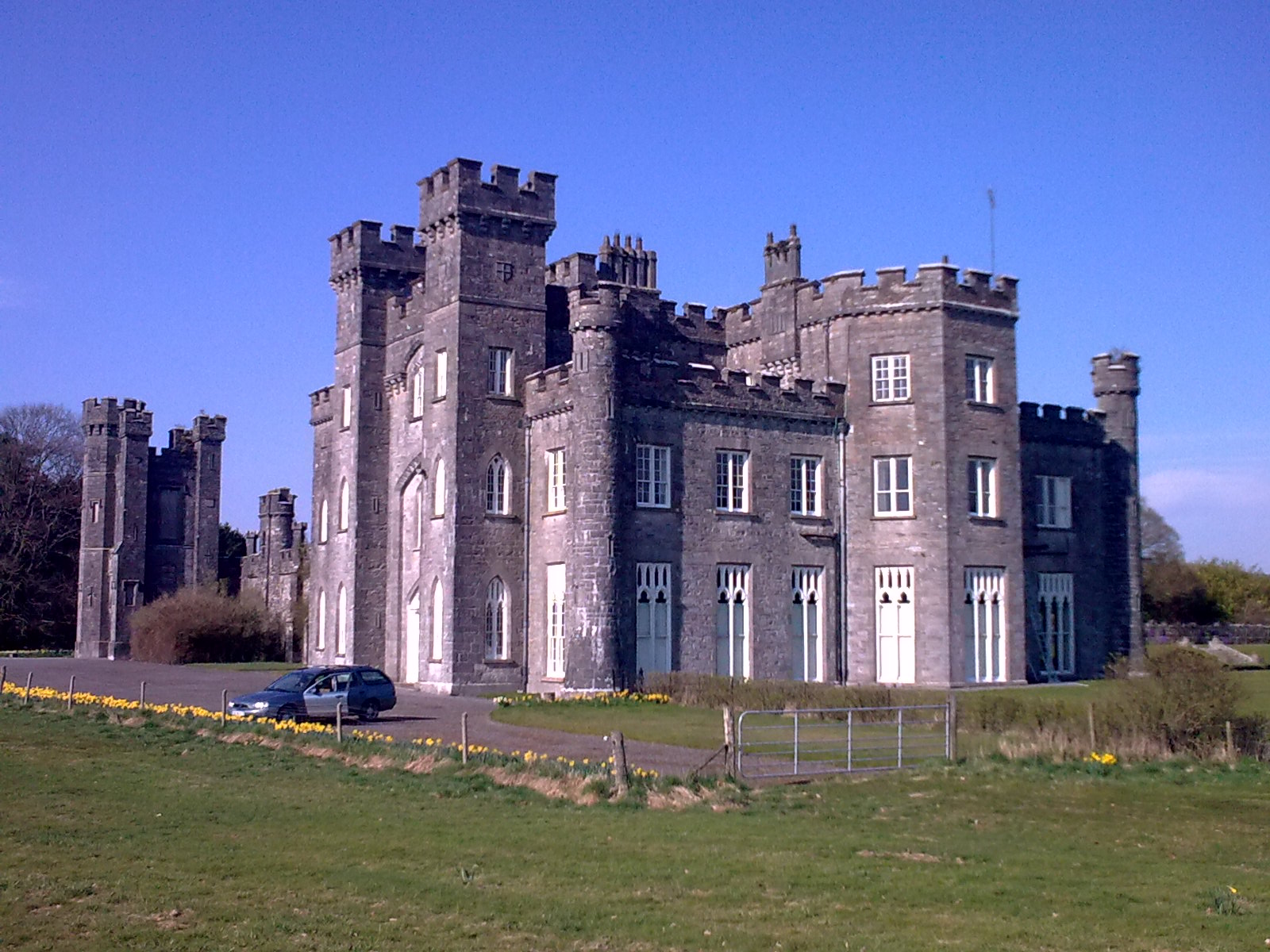
Knockdrin Castle

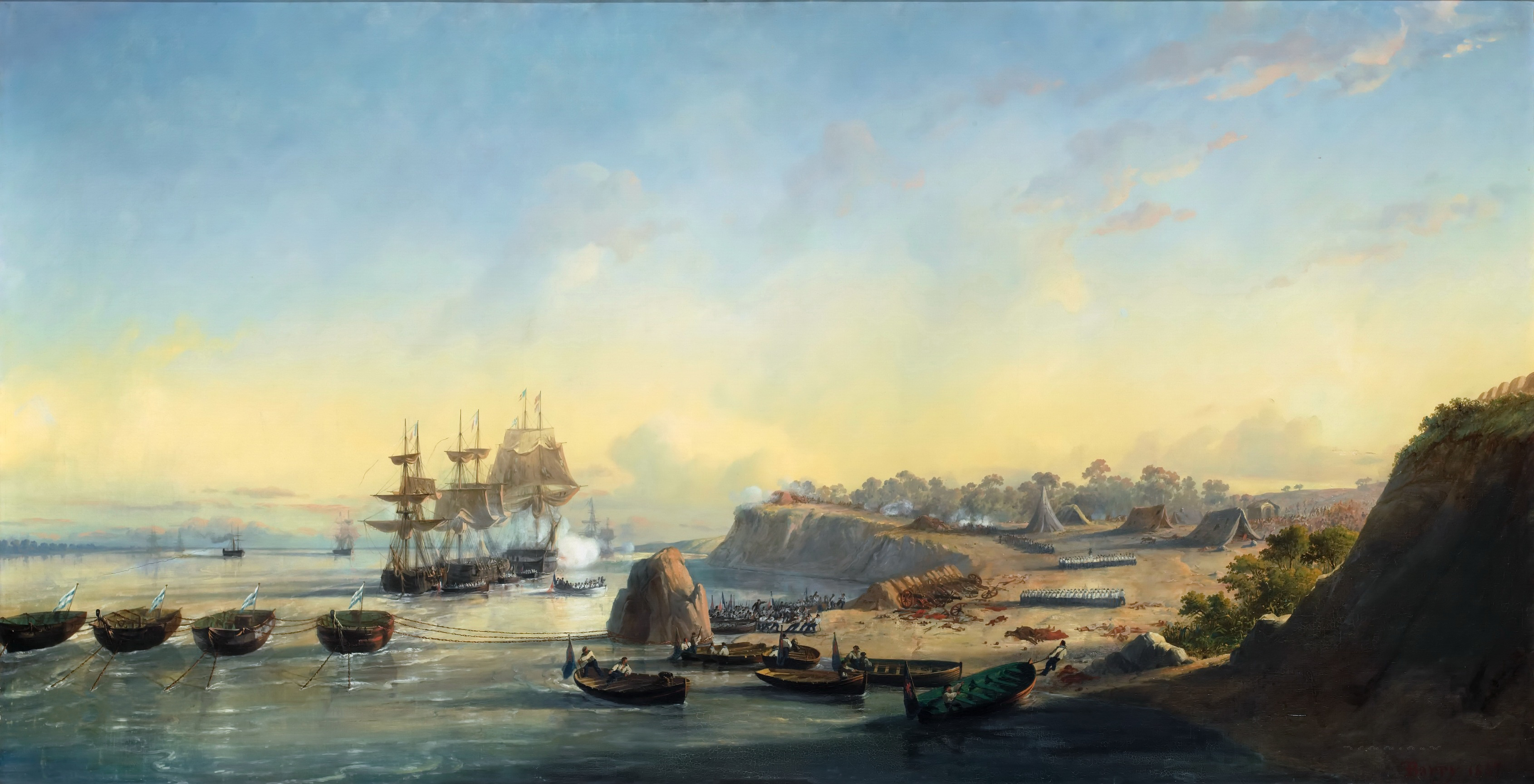
The Batthe of Parana (Vuelta de Obligado))

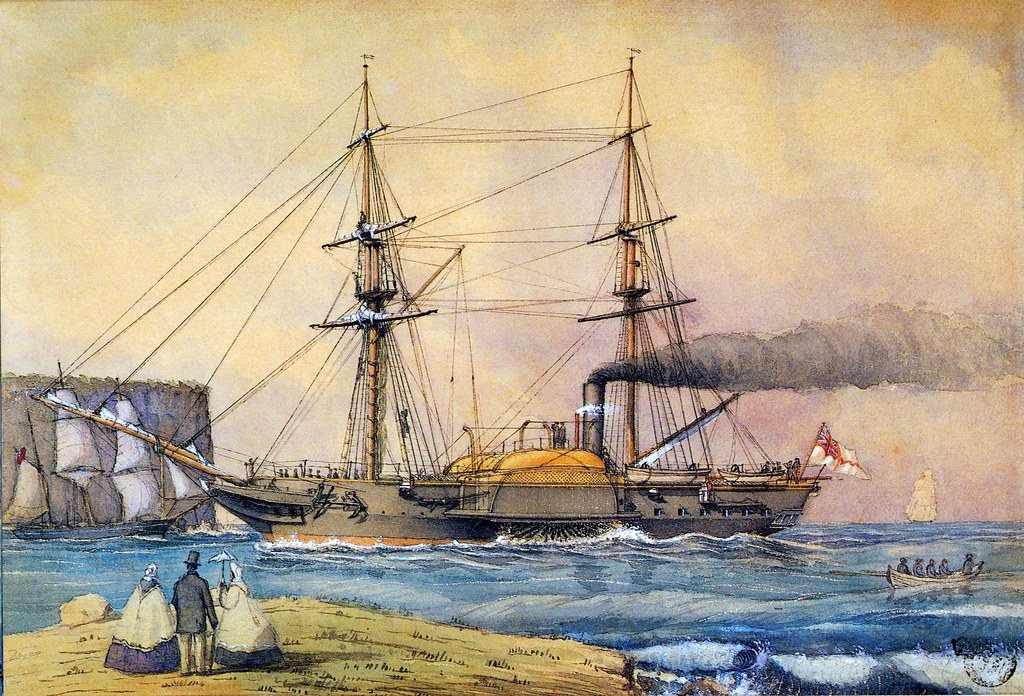
A Royal Navy steam sloop of the 1840s

Reginald Thomas John Levinge (1813–1848) was a British aristocrat and second in line to the Levinge baronetcy but never became baronet. He served as a commander in the Royal Navy. He was donor of some of the Levinge Papers which are held in the National Library of Ireland.

== Life ==
He was born on 20 October 1813 the third son (and one of 12 children) of Sir Richard Levinge, baronet and Elizabeth Anne Parkyns. He was born at Knockdrin Castle in County Westmeath in Ireland. His maternal grandfather was Thomas Boothby Parkyns, Lord Radcliffe.

His eldest brother, Richard, born in 1811, joined the British Army and reached the rank of Captain, later becoming Colonel of the Westmeath Militia. He had several brothers, including George in the Royal Horse Artillery, Augustus in the 71st Infantry, Charles also in the British Army, and Vere Henry Levinge who served as an officer in the Honourable East India Company.

He entered the Royal Navy on 7 January 1827 aged 13. He passed the exam as a lieutenant in 1832 but did not receive a commission until October 1839 when he was placed as a lieutenant on the 72-gun HMS Melville under command of the Hon George Elliot in the East Indies. In February 1840 he moved to the smaller 16-gun HMS Wolverene under Captain William Tucker off the coast of Africa.

On 25 August 1840 he took command of the brigantine HMS Buzzard. In January 1844 he became senior lieutenant of the 26-gun HMS Volage under Captain William Dickson, which had recently seen action at the Battle of Chuenpi. In February 1845 he took command of the small brigantine HMS Dolphin on the south-east coast of America. During this period he saw action at the Battle of Parana in November 1845 as part of the war between Brazil and Paraguay. In this a combined French and English fleet destroyed the land-based artillery batteries and a number of vessels which were intended to blockade the river. The action overall was under command of Sir Charles Hotham. Hotham's correspondence shows a concern for HMS Dolphin which held a position more befitting a larger ship, and came under heavy fire. Levinge was lauded for his bravery and was promoted to Commodore on 18 November 1845. However, he appears to have been wounded in some way.

He served as commander of the 6-gun, 149 crew HMS Devastation in 1846. This time was spent in the Mediterranean.

In September 1847 command of the Devastation transferred to Reynell Charles Michell. Although some sources state that Levinge then retired on half pay he appears to have continued in service until death.

He died on 24 April 1848 aged only 34. His grave lies in Georgetown Cemetery on Ascension Island, giving his last command as HMS Penelope.

His father died in September of the same year and the baronetcy passed to his elder brother Richard before passing to his younger brother Vere Henry Levinge in 1884.

== Family ==
His brother August died at sea of disease in 1838 (aged only 23) following a post in Barbados.
