= Richard Levinge =

Richard Levinge may refer to:

- Sir Richard Levinge, 1st Baronet (1656–1724) Speaker of the Irish House of Commons, also sat in the English House of Commons, and Commons of Great Britain
- Sir Richard Levinge, 2nd Baronet (c1690–1748) Irish landowner and politician, MP for Westmeath 1723–27 and for Blessington 1727–48
- Richard Levinge (1724–1783), Irish politician, MP for Duleek 1768-76
- Sir Richard Levinge, 7th Baronet (1811–1884), Irish landowner and politician, MP for Westmeath 1857–65
- Sir Richard Levinge, 4th Baronet (c 1723–1786) of the Levinge baronets
- Sir Richard Levinge, 6th Baronet (1785–1848) of the Levinge baronets
- Sir Richard George Augustus Levinge, 7th Baronet (1811–1884) of the Levinge baronets
- Sir Richard William Levinge, 10th Baronet (1878–1914) of the Levinge baronets
- Sir Richard Vere Henry Levinge, 11th Baronet (1911–1984) of the Levinge baronets
- Sir Richard George Robin Levinge, 12th Baronet (1946–2025) of the Levinge baronets
