= Sir Benjamin Chapman, 4th Baronet =

Anglo-Irish politician and barrister (1810–1888)

Sir Benjamin Chapman Bt

Member of Parliament for County Westmeath
- In office 12 July 1841 – 10 August 1847 Serving with Hugh Morgan Tuite
- Preceded by: Richard Nagle; Montagu Chapman
- Succeeded by: William Henry Magan; Percy Nugent

Personal details
- Born: 9 February 1810
- Died: 3 November 1888 (aged 78) Dublin, Ireland
- Party: Whig

Sir Benjamin James Chapman, 4th Baronet (9 February 1810 – 3 November 1888) was an Anglo-Irish Whig politician and barrister.

== Biography ==
Chapman was the son of Sir Thomas Chapman, 2nd Baronet and Margaret Anne Fetherstonhaugh, and the brother of Sir Montagu Chapman, 3rd Baronet. He was educated at Trinity College Dublin, graduating with a Bachelor of Arts in 1830 and becoming a practicing barrister. In 1849, he married his cousin, Maria Fetherstonhaugh, daughter of Richard Steele Fetherstonhaugh and Dorothea née George. They had three children: Dora Marguerite Chapman, Sir Montagu Richard Chapman, 5th Baronet (1853–1907), and Sir Benjamin Rupert Chapman, 6th Baronet (1865–1914).

He was elected Whig MP for County Westmeath at the 1841 general election and held the seat until 1847 when he did not seek re-election.

He succeeded to the Baronetcy of Killua Castle in 1853 upon the death of his brother, Montagu Chapman. Upon his own death in 1888, the title was inherited by his son, Montagu Richard Chapman.

He was also a member of the Reform Club, and High Sheriff of Westmeath in 1856, and Custos Rotulorum of Westmeath and Lord Lieutenant of Westmeath from 1883 and 1888.

Parliament of the United Kingdom
Preceded by Richard Nagle; Montagu Chapman	Member of Parliament for County Westmeath; 1841–1847; With: Hugh Morgan Tuite	Succeeded by William Henry Magan; Percy Nugent
Baronetage of Ireland
Preceded by Montagu Chapman	Baronet (of Killua Castle); 1853 – 1888	Succeeded by Montagu Richard Chapman
