= 1871 County Westmeath by-election =

UK Parliamentary by-election

The 1871 County Westmeath by-election was fought on 17 June 1871. The by-election was fought due to the Death of the incumbent MP of the Liberal Party, William Pollard-Urquhart. It was won by the Home Rule candidate Patrick James Smyth, who was unopposed. The gain was retained at the 1874 general election.
