= Benjamin Chapman =

17th-century English Army officer

- Born: 1621 unknown (possibly County Kerry, Ireland)
- Died: Unknown
- Known for: Patriarch of the Chapman baronets of Killua Castle
- Title: Captain
- Spouse: Anne Parkinson
- Children: William Chapman; Thomas Chapman
- Parent: William Chapman

Captain Benjamin Chapman (born 1621) was the patriarch of the Chapman baronets of Killua Castle.

Chapman was a Cornet in the regiment of cavalry raised by Murrough O'Brien, 1st Earl of Inchiquin. He was later promoted to captain, and served in the Cromwellian conquest of Ireland. After the conquest, Oliver Cromwell granted Chapman an estate in the county of Westmeath, at Killua (also known as St. Lucy's), a former preceptory of the Knights Hospitallers.

Chapman's father, William, and uncle, John, had been supported by their maternal first cousin, Sir Walter Raleigh, who helped them procure land grants in the County Kerry. Due to financial troubles and their patron Raleigh's death in 1618, they were forced to sell the land to Richard Boyle, 1st Earl of Cork, for £26,400. Benjamin was William's only son.

Chapman married Anne, daughter of Robert Parkinson (esq. of Ardee). They had two sons, William and Thomas. William remained with his father at St. Lucy's and married Ismay, daughter of Thomas Nugent (esq. of Clonlost). Thomas emigrated to America.

== Notable descendants ==
- T. E. Lawrence ("Lawrence of Arabia"), illegitimate son of Sir Thomas Chapman, 7th Baronet
- Orde Wingate. Wingate and Laurence are related third cousins from the common ancestor of Ben Chapman. Both Wingate and Laurence held remarkable military service when supporting indigenous and marginalised groups form effective military forces.
- Welcome Chapman
