= Sir Richard Nagle, 2nd Baronet =

Irish politician, died 1850

Sir Richard Nagle, 2nd Baronet DL

Member of Parliament for County Westmeath
- In office 1832–1841

Personal details
- Born: 12 August 1800 Ireland
- Died: 10 November 1850 (aged 50) Ireland
- Party: Repeal Association
- Occupation: Magistrate

Sir Richard Nagle, 2nd Baronet (12 August 1800 – 10 November 1850) was an Irish Member of Parliament.

Nagle lived at Jamestown House, in County Westmeath. He was a magistrate, but was dismissed for presiding over a meeting that was held in opposition to tithes for the Anglican church. At the 1832 UK general election, he stood in County Westmeath for the Repeal Association, and was elected. He held his seat until the 1841 UK general election, when he stood down.

Nagle served a term as High Sheriff of Westmeath, and was also a deputy-lieutenant of the county.

Parliament of the United Kingdom
Preceded by Montagu Chapman; Gustavus Rochefort	Member of Parliament for County Westmeath; 1832–1841; With: Montagu Chapman	Succeeded by Hugh Morgan Tuite; Benjamin Chapman
Peerage of Ireland
Preceded by Richard Nagle	Baronet (of Jamestown); 1827–1850	Extinct
