= HMS Devastation (1841) =

Sloop of the Royal Navy

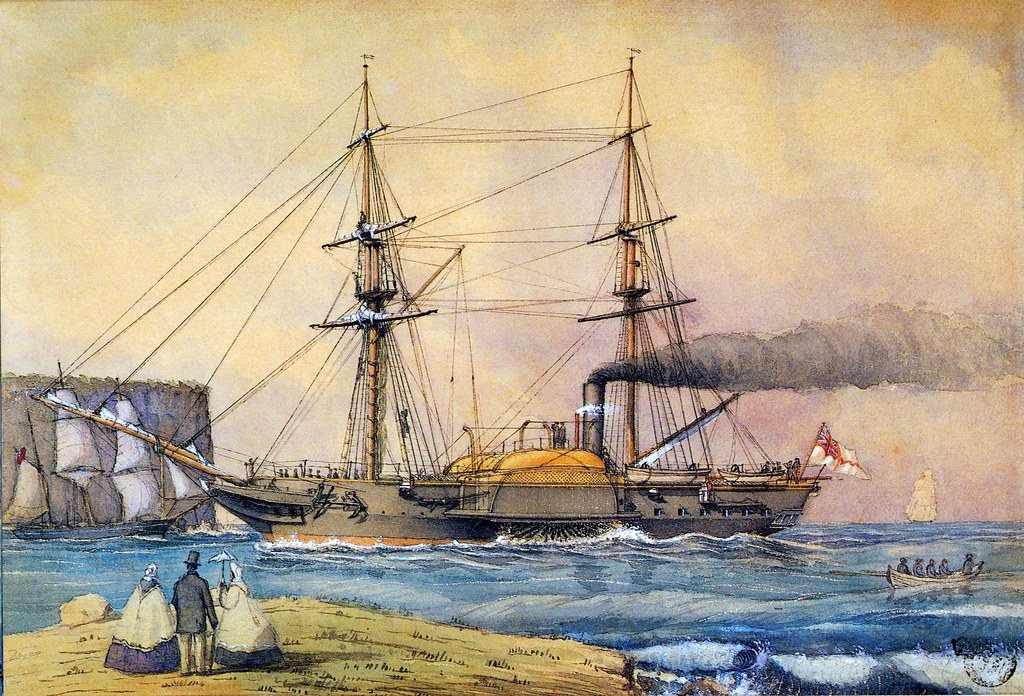
A Royal Navy steam sloop of the 1840s

HMS Devastation was a Royal Navy Driver class steam sloop, unusually powered as a paddle steamer designed by Sir William Symonds and launched in 1841. She saw no major action but did have some noteworthy commanders.

== Service ==
She was built at the Royal Dockyard, Woolwich and launched on 3 July, 1841 under command of Hastings Reginald Henry. She was armed with 6 guns (including a pair of 68lb guns) and a crew of 149 men. She served her first year in the Mediterranean.

In May 1842, command transferred to John James Robinson for a period before going back to Captain Henry. In November 1843, it passed to Swynfen Carnegie and in February 1844, William Hewgill Kitchen (who was later Governor of Ascension Island) took command.

From October 1845 to March 1846, she was recommissioned at Woolwich and put under Commander Edward Crouch and became part of the Squadron of Evolution serving off the west coast of Africa passing to Captain Charles Hotham in May 1846. Hotham was later Governor of Victoria.

In 1846, under Hotham she joined the Experimental Squadron in Portsmouth. After a brief time back with Captain Crouch it passed to Reginald Thomas John Levinge, third son of Sir Richard Levinge, baronet. This was still off the coast of West Africa. In September 1847, command passed to Commander Reynell Charles Michell for 12 months who took her to the Cape of Good Hope.

In a change of scene in May 1851, she sailed to North America and the West Indies under Captain Colin Yorke Campbell. From 1853 to 1858, she stayed in the West Indies under successive command of: Algernon Frederick Rous de Horsey; Edward Marshall; Leveson Somerset; Charles Wake; and John Kennedy Erskine Baird.

In December 1861, she was posted to the Pacific under John Dobree McCrea. After six months command passed to John William Pike, under whose command in 1864 there were reports of an outbreak of bronchopneumonia.

Still in the Pacific at Christmas 1864 command passed to the Hon Walter Hylton Joliffe who returned her to England in August 1866. She was broken for scrap in 1866.

== Trivia ==
Hotham's letters of 1846 to 1848 from the Devastation to England are preserved in the National Archive at Kew.
