= The Valley of the Squinting Windows =

1918 novel by Brinsley MacNamara

- Title page of first edition
- Author: Brinsley MacNamara
- Language: English
- Genre: Novel
- Set in: Rural Ireland, 1914–16
- Published: 1918 (Maunsel & Co.)
- Publication place: Ireland
- Media type: Print (Hardback & Paperback)
- Pages: 212 p. (first edition)
- ISBN: 0-947962-01-8 (paperback edition)
- OCLC: 14521257
- Dewey Decimal: 823.912

The Valley of the Squinting Windows is a 1918 novel by Brinsley MacNamara (born John Weldon), set in the fictional village of Garradrimna, in central Ireland.

== Setting ==
While MacNamara insisted that Garradrimna could represent any village in Ireland, geographical landmarks mentioned in the book and correspondences between its characters and his neighbours suggest that Garradrimna is based on the author's hometown Delvin, County Westmeath; most notably, a de Lacy castle located at one end of the town. Also, a train from the region to Dublin passes through County Meath.

== Plot ==
The novel is set in central Ireland c. 1914–16. Garradrimna is a tiny village where everyone is interested in everyone else's business and wishes them to fail. Twenty years before the events of the book, Nan Byrne has a relationship with a local man, Henry Shannon, hoping to marry him for his wealth. She falls pregnant but Henry refuses to marry her. After a miscarriage, the baby is buried at the bottom of the garden. Henry marries another woman and later dies, while Nan emigrates to England and marries Ned Brennan. They later move back to Garradrimna, where the villagers rejoice in telling Ned about his wife's past.

Ned is now an alcoholic, brought low by the humiliation of his wife's past promiscuity. He makes a little as a labourer, whereas Nan works every day at sewing to support their only child, John, studying in England to become a Catholic priest. However, she has become as cruel, petty and jealous as the rest of Garradrimna, and connives with the postmistress to sabotage Myles Shannon's chance at romance with an English girl, to get revenge on the Shannon family for rejecting her.

John returns to Garradrimna for a holiday, where he befriends Ulick Shannon (son of Henry) and falls for Rebecca Kerr, a schoolteacher. Ulick and Rebecca have a relationship, however, and when Rebecca becomes pregnant she is disgraced and expelled from the village. Ulick abandons her and John murders him, weighting the body with lead and hiding it in the lake. Rebecca leaves for Dublin and an uncertain future. An old gossip informs Nan and John that she was there the night Nan gave birth to Henry's child — in reality, the child was born alive and was given to Henry and his wife — who they raised as their son, Ulick Shannon.

== Reception ==
Hostility toward the work in MacNamara's native Delvin led to the book's burning shortly after its publication. The stir caused the author's schoolmaster father, James, to be boycotted. In response, Weldon, snr., initiated a high-profile court case against those who thought that they had been described in the novel.

MacNamara's novel has been reprinted several times, particularly when interest in the topic re-emerges. "Valley of the squinting windows" has become a colloquial term in Ireland to refer to a place where judgmental gossip is common.

== Release details ==
- 1918, Dublin, Maunsel & Co., hardback
- 1918, London, Sampson Low, Marston, hardback
- 1919, New York, Brentano's, hardback
- 1976, Ireland, Anvil Books ISBN 0-900068-35-3, Pub date September 1976, paperback
- 1984, Ireland, Anvil Books ISBN 0-900068-83-3, Pub date 11 July 1984, paperback
- 1984, Ireland, Anvil Books ISBN 0-900068-82-5, Pub date 11 July 1984, hardback
- 1985, Ireland, Anvil Books ISBN 0-947962-01-8, Pub date September 1985, paperback
