= Hugh Morgan Tuite =

Irish Whig politician, Westminster M.P. (1795–1868)

Member of Parliament for County Westmeath
- In office 12 July 1841 – 10 August 1847 Serving with Benjamin Chapman
- Preceded by: Montagu Chapman; Richard Nagle
- Succeeded by: William Henry Magan; Percy Nugent
- In office 22 June 1826 – 12 August 1830 Serving with Gustavus Rochfort
- Preceded by: Hercules Robert Pakenham; Robert Smyth
- Succeeded by: Gustavus Rochfort; Montagu Chapman

Personal details
- Born: 1795
- Died: 15 August 1868 (aged 72–73) Sonna, County Westmeath, Ireland
- Party: Whig

Hugh Morgan Tuite (1795 – 15 August 1868) was an Irish Whig politician.

He was the first surviving son of Hugh Tuite of Sonna and Sarah Elizabeth née Chenevix, daughter of Lieutenant-Colonel Daniel Chenevix of Ballycommon. He was educated at Christ Church, Oxford. In 1826, he married Mary, daughter of Maurice O'Connor, with whom he had one son and one daughter—Joseph Tuite (1828–1910) and Sarah Elizabeth Tuite (died 1905)—before her death in 1863. He married again, in 1863, to Hester Maria, daughter of John Hogan.

After testing the field via a "limited canvas" in 1824, Tuite was first elected MP for County Westmeath at the 1826 general election, offering himself as a pro-Catholic opposed to dominant Protestant interests, and devoid of "any particular line of politics". He told electors that emancipation would restore "peace and good order" and that he wished for the county to be rescued "from the degradation of being considered a sort of family property, or hereditary borough". His election was supported by the Catholic Association and, despite accusations of widespread electoral misconduct by his supporters amid a "severe struggle", was returned to the seat.

A petition was lodged against his return, which Tuite declined to defend, causing him to be absent for a number of votes in parliament. After associates registered as defence, however, a commission was established in 1827, but then broke up in 1828 and the petition was decided in his favour. This period of his parliamentary career saw Tuite vote in favour of Catholic relief and emancipation, both for Catholics and Jews.

Tuite stood for election for the same seat in 1830 but, faced with an alliance between his former opponents and criticism for his support of emancipation, he was "rather remiss" with canvassing and was defeated. At the 1831 election, he initially stood as a supporter of the Grey ministry's reform bill, but withdrew.

He returned to parliament, again sitting for Westmeath, after the 1841 general election and held the seat until 1847, when he did not seek re-election.

Before his death at his family home, Sonna, in 1868, Tuite was also a Justice of the Peace for County Westmeath, and Deputy Lieutenant of County Westmeath. He had also been High Sheriff of Westmeath in 1822, and High Sheriff of Longford in 1837.

Parliament of the United Kingdom
Preceded by Hercules Robert Pakenham; Robert Smyth	Member of Parliament for County Westmeath; 1826–1830; With: Gustavus Rochfort	Succeeded by Gustavus Rochfort; Montagu Chapman
Preceded by Montagu Chapman; Richard Nagle	Member of Parliament for County Westmeath; 1841–1847; With: Benjamin Chapman	Succeeded by William Henry Magan; Percy Nugent
