= Brinsley MacNamara =

Irish writer

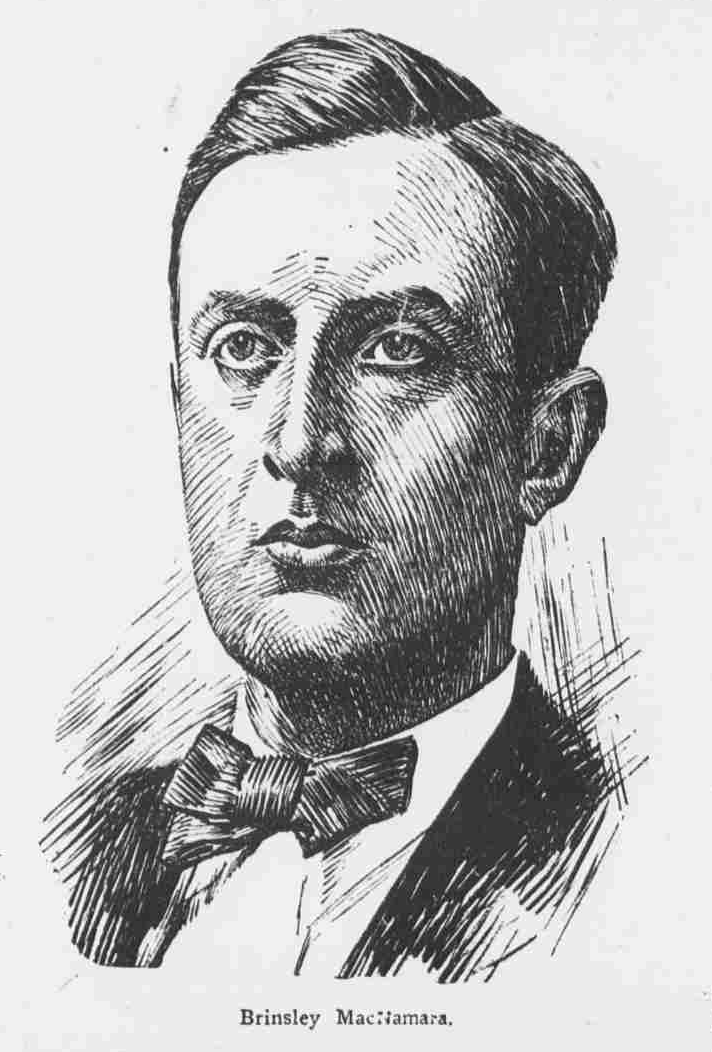
- Drawing of MacNamara, circa 1920
- Born: John Weldon; 6 September 1890; Hiskinstown, Delvin, County Westmeath, Ireland
- Died: 4 February 1963 (aged 72); Dublin, Ireland
- Occupations: Novelist, playwright, actor, critic
- Writing career
- Pen name: Brinsley MacNamara, Oliver Blythe
- Notable works: The Valley of the Squinting Windows (1918), Look at the Heffernans! (1926)
- Literary movement: Irish Literary Revival

John Weldon (6 September 1890 – 4 February 1963; alternatively "A. E. Weldon"), known by his pen- and stage-name Brinsley MacNamara, was an Irish writer, playwright, and the registrar of the National Gallery of Ireland. He is the author of several novels, the most well-known of which was his first, The Valley of the Squinting Windows (1918). His acting career with the Abbey Theatre began in September 1910 with a role in R. J. Ryan's The Casting-out of Martin Whelan.

MacNamara is still best known for his first novel, The Valley of the Squinting Windows, set in a fictional village called Garradrimna, which caused a furore in his native Westmeath on its publication. He continued to write for many years after this controversial first work, and located most of his later fiction in Garradrimna, in the Irish Midlands. Among his plays are The Glorious Uncertainty (1923) and Look at the Heffernans! (1926). His work was part of the literature event in the art competition at the 1924 Summer Olympics.

MacNamara married Helena Degidon, a schoolteacher, in 1920. He died at his home on Gilford Drive in Sandymount, County Dublin in February 1963.

== Partial list of works ==
- The Valley of the Squinting Windows, novel (1918)
- In Clay and in Bronze, novel (1919/1920), published as The Irishman: A Novel under another pseudonym, Oliver Blyth.
- The Clanking of Chains: A Story of Sinn Fein, novel (1919)
- The Mirror in the Dusk, novel (1921)
- The Glorious Uncertainty, play (1923)
- Look at the Heffernans!, play (1926)
- The Various Lives of Marcus Igoe, novel (1929)
- The Smiling Faces, and other stories, short stories (1929)
- Return to Ebontheever, novel (1930), reissued as Othello's Daughter (1942)
- Margaret Gillan, play (1933)
- Marks and Mabel, play (1945)
- Some Curious People, short stories (1945)
- Michael Caravan, novel (1946)
- The Whole Story of the X.Y.Z., novella (1951)
