= William Henry Magan =

Irish politician (died 1861)

Member of Parliament for County Westmeath
- In office 10 August 1847 – 10 May 1859 Serving with Richard Levinge (1857–1859); William Pollard-Urquhart (1852–1857); Percy Nugent (1847–1852)
- Preceded by: Hugh Morgan Tuite; Benjamin Chapman
- Succeeded by: William Pollard-Urquhart; Richard Levinge

Personal details
- Born: 1820
- Died: c. September 1861
- Party: Whig
- Other political affiliations: Independent Irish Party; Repeal Association

William Henry Magan (1820 – c. September 1861) was an Irish Whig, Independent Irish Party and Repeal Association politician.

Magan was elected a Repeal Association Member of Parliament (MP) for County Westmeath at the 1847 general election and, becoming an Independent Irish Party MP in 1852 and then a Whig again in 1857, held the seat until 1859 when he did not seek re-election.

Parliament of the United Kingdom
Preceded by Hugh Morgan Tuite; Benjamin Chapman	Member of Parliament for County Westmeath; 1847–1859; With: Richard Levinge (1857–1859); William Pollard-Urquhart (1852–1857); Percy Nugent (1847–1852)	Succeeded by William Pollard-Urquhart; Richard Levinge
