= Sir Montagu Chapman, 3rd Baronet =

Anglo-Irish landowner and politician (1808–1852)

Sir Montagu Chapman Bt
- Born: Montagu Lowther Chapman; 19 December 1808; Killua Castle, Clonmellon, Ireland
- Died: 17 May 1852 (aged 43); Tasman Sea
- Occupation: Member of Parliament
- Known for: Mysterious disappearance

Sir Montagu Lowther Chapman (19 December 1808 – 17 May 1852) was an Anglo-Irish landowner and Member of Parliament (MP).

He was born at Killua Castle, Westmeath, the son of Sir Thomas Chapman, 2nd Baronet and educated at Trinity College Dublin. He succeeded his father to the baronetcy and the Killua estate in 1837.

== Biography ==
He was elected Member of Parliament for County Westmeath in the UK Parliament in 1830, holding the seat until 1841, after which it passed to his brother. In that same year he visited Australia and on 14 June 1842 was granted title to a large estate near Adelaide, which he leased out as smaller farms. Many of the farms were leased to tenants from his own Irish estate, from where 120 people emigrated to Australia. Originally named Montagu's Farm, the area is now known as Gepp's Cross.

He was appointed High Sheriff of Westmeath for 1844.

He was last seen in 1852 on a sea voyage from Melbourne to Sydney, when the vessel in which he was sailing disappeared without trace. He had never married and his Irish and Australian estates were inherited by his younger brother Sir Benjamin James Chapman, 4th Baronet.

== See also ==
- List of people who disappeared mysteriously at sea

== Sources ==
- The Annual Register:History and Politics for 1853.

Parliament of the United Kingdom
Preceded by Hugh Morgan Tuite; Gustavus Rochefort	Member of Parliament for County Westmeath; 1830–1841; With: Gustavus Rochefort 1830–1832; Sir Richard Nagle 1832–1841	Succeeded by Hugh Morgan Tuite; Benjamin Chapman
Honorary titles
Preceded by George Augustus Boyd	High Sheriff of Westmeath; 1844	Succeeded by Hon. Laurence King-Harman
Peerage of Ireland
Preceded by Thomas Chapman	Baronet (of Killua Castle); 1837–1852	Succeeded by Benjamin Chapman
