= Tuite baronets =

Baronetcy in the Baronetage of Ireland

The Tuite Baronetcy, of Sonna (An Sonnach) in the County of Westmeath, is a title in the Baronetage of Ireland. It was created on 16 June 1622 for Oliver Tuite. At the time of the Norman Invasion of Ireland, Henry II granted to Hugh de Lacy, 1st Earl of Ulster, the lands of Ó Maoilsheachlainn, king of Meath in return for the service of 50 Knights. As one of de Lacy's barons Risteárd de Tiúit received large grants in Westmeath and Longford. His descendants became the barons of Moyashell, in Westmeath. De Lacy conferred on the Tuite family the castle of O'Casey (Irish Ó Cathasaigh), chief of Saithne, now "Sonnagh," in Westmeath. The seventh Baronet was murdered at Sonnagh. This senior branch of the family became Protestant in order to hold on to their lands and in the early twentieth century moved to Britain. The Sonnagh estate is today in ruins outside the town of Ballynacargy in County Westmeath.

Hugh Tuite, MP for County Westmeath, was gazetted a baronet, "of Sound in the County of Westmeath", on 3 July 1838, which was reported in The Times on 4 July. However, it appears that the announcement was an error and on 6 July a notice appeared in The Gazette that the creation of the baronetcy was "not to take place."
