= John Porter-Porter =

Northern Irish politician (1855-1939)

John Porter-Porter (3 April 1855 – 10 August 1939) was a unionist politician in Northern Ireland.

== Biography ==
He was born John Porter Archdale on 3 April 1855, the son of Nicholas Montgomery Archdale of Crock-na-crieve, co. Fermanagh. He studied at The King's School, Worcester and Caius College, Cambridge, then resided at Belle Isle in County Fermanagh. He adopted his unusual surname of Porter-Porter in 1876, replacing Archdale with Porter, in accordance with the terms of an inheritance.

He served as a J.P. and Deputy Lieutenant of Co. Longford and was appointed High Sheriff of Longford for 1879 and as High Sheriff of Fermanagh for 1883.

Porter-Porter was elected to the first Senate of Northern Ireland for the Ulster Unionist Party, despite his lack of political experience. He retired from the Senate in 1937, and died two years later. He had married Josephine, the eldest daughter of Jesse Lloyd of Co. Monaghan.
