= Sir Benjamin Chapman, 1st Baronet =

Anglo-Irish landowner

Sir Benjamin Chapman, 1st Baronet was an Anglo-Irish landowner.

He was educated at Trinity College, Dublin. Sir Benjamin had Killua Castle, County Westmeath built as his family home. He was created first baronet of Killua Castle on 10 February 1782. He died in 1810 and was succeeded by his brother Sir Thomas Chapman, 2nd Baronet.

Peerage of Ireland
| Preceded by Inaugural appointment | Baronet (of Killua Castle); 1782–1810 | Succeeded by Thomas Chapman |
