= Sir Richard Levinge, 7th Baronet =

Irish landowner and politician

Sir Richard George Augustus Levinge, 7th Baronet (1 November 1811 – 28 September 1884) was an Irish landowner and politician from Knockdrin Castle, County Westmeath. He sat in the House of Commons of the United Kingdom from 1857 to 1865.

== Life ==
His mother was a sister of the 2nd Baron Rancliffe, who died without issue in November 1850. Sir Richard inherited his uncle's entailed property, valued at between £1,000 and £2,000 per annum. In 1846 he was commissioned as Lieutenant Colonel of the Westmeath Militia. He was Sheriff of Westmeath in 1851–2, and in 1853 was appointed as a Deputy Lieutenant of the county.

At the 1852 general election, he contested the County Westmeath constituency as a Conservative, without success.

Five years later, at the 1857 election, he was returned unopposed for Westmeath as an Independent Opposition candidate. That party collapsed in 1859, he was re-elected at the 1859 general election, as a Liberal.

He did not contest the 1865 election. He was asked to stand again at the 1868 general election, but refused. He said that although he was a Liberal on all other points, he was a staunch Protestant, and opposed the Liberal policy of disestablishing the Church of Ireland.

He died in Brussels on Sunday 28 September 1884, aged 73. He was succeeded in the baronetcy by his brother Vere Henry Levinge, an officer in the Madras Civil Service.

== Family ==
Richard was brother to Commodore Reginald Thomas John Levinge of the Royal Navy.

== Works ==
- Echoes from the Backwoods; or, Sketches of Transatlantic Life (London, 1846, 2 vols.)
- Cromwell Doolan; or, Life in the Army (London, 1849, 2 vols.) (Internet Archive)
- A Day With the Brookside Harriers at Brighton (London, 1858) (Internet Archive)
- Historical Records of the Forty-third Regiment, Monmouthshire Light Infantry, with a roll of the Officers and their services (Internet Archive)

Parliament of the United Kingdom
Preceded by William Henry Magan; William Pollard-Urquhart	Member of Parliament for County Westmeath; 1857–1865; With: William Henry Magan to 1859; William Pollard-Urquhart from 1859	Succeeded by William Pollard-Urquhart; Hon. Algernon Greville-Nugent
Baronetage of Ireland
Preceded by Richard Levinge	Baronet (of High Park); 1848–1884	Succeeded by Vere Henry Levinge
