= Sir Thomas Chapman, 2nd Baronet =

Anglo-Irish landowner

Sir Thomas Chapman, 2nd Baronet (20 October 1756 - 22 December 1837) was an Anglo-Irish landowner.

He was educated at Trinity College, Dublin. He succeeded to the baronetcy on the death of his brother Sir Benjamin Chapman, 1st Baronet in August 1810. He died in 1837 and was succeeded by his son Sir Montagu Lowther Chapman, 3rd Baronet, who became the MP for Westmeath and its High Sheriff.

Peerage of Ireland
Preceded by Sir Benjamin Chapman, 1st Baronet	Baronet (of Killua Castle); 1810–1837	Succeeded by Sir Montagu Chapman, 3rd Baronet
