= Clonmellon =

Clonmellon Ráistín
- Village
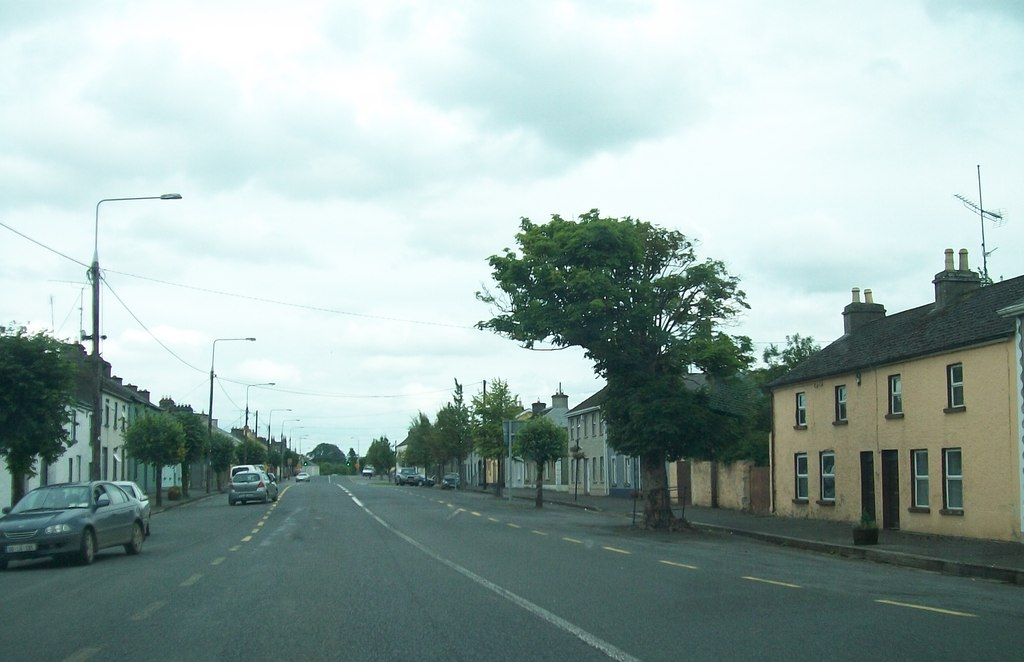
- Clonmellon's main street

- Location in Ireland
- Coordinates: 53°39′51″N 7°01′10″W
- Country: Ireland
- Province: Leinster
- County: County Westmeath

Population (2022)
  - Total: 702
- Irish Grid Reference: N644688

Clonmellon (Irish: Ráistín, but also attested to originally have been Cluain Miolain) is a small village in County Westmeath, Ireland, near the border with County Meath. It is situated on the N52 road between Kells in County Meath and Delvin in County Westmeath.

== Buildings of note ==
Ballinlough Castle, a 17th-century country house is located nearby. The 18th-century Killua Castle is also located close to Clonmellon.

== See also ==
- List of towns and villages in Ireland
- Market Houses in Ireland
