= Percy Nugent =

Irish politician (1797–1874)

Sir Percy Fitzgerald Nugent, 1st Baronet (29 September 1797 – 25 June 1874), was an Irish politician.

He was made a baronet on 30 September 1831, of Donore in the County of Westmeath. He was pricked High Sheriff of Longford for 1836. He was commissioned as a Captain in the disembodied Westmeath Militia on 29 June 1840.

Nugent was elected to the United Kingdom House of Commons as Member of Parliament for County Westmeath in 1847, and held the seat until 1852.

Parliament of the United Kingdom
Preceded by Hugh Tuite; Benjamin Chapman	Member of Parliament for County Westmeath; 1847–1852; With: William Magan	Succeeded by William Magan; William Pollard-Urquhart
Honorary titles
Preceded by R. W. Cooper	High Sheriff of Westmeath	Succeeded by William Chapman
Baronetage of the United Kingdom
New creation	Baronet (of Donore); 1832–1874	Succeeded by Walter George Nugent
