= Glencara =

Village in County Westmeath, Ireland

- Village
- Location in Ireland
- Coordinates: 53°30′53″N 7°33′36″W
- Country: Ireland
- Province: Leinster
- County: County Westmeath
- Time zone: UTC+0 (WET)
  - Summer (DST): UTC-1 (IST (WEST))

Glencara is a village in County Westmeath, Ireland. It is 15 km west of Mullingar, at the crossroads of the R389 and the L5342 roads.

The Hill of Uisneach stands to the south of the town.

Glencara House, an early 19th century country house, once owned by the Kelly and Hume families, stands to the south of the crossroads.

== See also ==
- List of towns and villages in Ireland
