= 1869 County Westmeath by-election =

UK Parliamentary by-election

The 1869 Westmeath by-election was fought on 7 January 1869. The by-election arose through the appointment of the incumbent member, Algernon Fulke Greville, as Parliamentary Groom in Waiting, requiring him to seek re-election as was the custom of the time. It was retained by Greville who was unopposed.
