= Ben Chapman (footballer, born 1991) =

English-born BVI footballer

Personal information
- Full name: Ben Chapman
- Date of birth: 3 May 1991 (age 35)
- Place of birth: Stoke-on-Trent, England
- Position: Goalkeeper

Team information
- Current team: Leek Town

Senior career*
| Years | Team | Apps | (Gls) |
| 2009–2012 | Nantwich Town | 55 | (0) |
| 2011 | → Newcastle Town (loan) | | (0) |
| 2011-2012 | Leek Town | | (0) |
| 2012 | Airbus UK Broughton | 15 | (0) |
| 2013–2015 | Leek Town | | (0) |
| 2014–2015 | → Market Drayton Town (loan) | | (0) |
| 2015–2016 | Kidsgrove | 15 | (0) |
| 2016 | Glossop | 8 | (0) |
| 2016–???? | Leek Town | 16 | (0) |
| 2018 | → Winsford United (loan) | | (0) |
| 2019 | → Hanley Town (loan) | | |
| 2019–???? | → Congleton Town (loan) | | |
| 2020–2022 | Hanley Town | | |
| 2022– | Leek Town | | |

International career
| 2016–2019 | British Virgin Islands | 10 | (0) |
- * Club domestic league appearances and goals as of 7 August 2018

Ben Chapman (born 3 May 1991) is a British Virgin Islands international football goalkeeper who plays for English non-league side Leek Town.

== Club career ==
His club career has seen him play for Nantwich Town, Market Drayton Town, Kidsgrove Athletic, Glossop North End, Eccleshall and Airbus UK Broughton in Wales. He has had three spells playing for Leek Town. During his last spell with the club he had three loan periods at other clubs. In 2018 he joined Winsford United. In January 2019, Hanley Town took him on a short-term loan. In September 2019 he joined Congleton Town on loan.

In July 2020 he signed on a permanent deal with former loan club, Hanley Town. In March 2022 he rejoined Leek Town.

== International career ==
Born in Stoke-on-Trent, Chapman qualified to play for the British Virgin Islands due to him holding a British passport and he made his debut for them in the Caribbean Cup on 22 March 2016, against Martinique. He then played for the islands in the CONCACAF Nations League.

== Career statistics ==
=== Club ===
| Club | Season | League | | | FA Cup | | League Cup | | Other | | Total | |
| Club | Season | Division | Apps | Goals | Apps | Goals | Apps | Goals | Apps | Goals | Apps | Goals |
|---|---|---|---|---|---|---|---|---|---|---|---|---|
| Hanley Town | 2021–22 | Midland League Premier Division | 8 | 0 | 3 | 0 | — | | — | | 11 | 0 |
| Career total | | | 8 | 0 | 3 | 0 | 0 | 0 | 0 | 0 | 11 | 0 |

=== International ===
As of match played 13 October 2019

| National team | Year | Apps | Goals |
|---|---|---|---|
| British Virgin Islands | 2016 | 2 | 0 |
| British Virgin Islands | 2018 | 3 | 0 |
| British Virgin Islands | 2019 | 5 | 0 |
| Total | | 10 | 0 |
