= High Sheriff of Longford =

British Crown's former judicial representative

The High Sheriff of Longford was the British Crown's judicial representative in County Longford, Ireland from the 16th century until 1922, when the office was abolished in the new Free State and replaced by the office of Longford County Sheriff. The sheriff had judicial, electoral, ceremonial and administrative functions and executed High Court Writs. In 1908, an Order in Council made the Lord-Lieutenant the Sovereign's prime representative in a county and reduced the High Sheriff's precedence. However the sheriff retained his responsibilities for the preservation of law and order in the county. The usual procedure for appointing the sheriff from 1660 onwards was that three persons were nominated at the beginning of each year from the county and the Lord Lieutenant then appointed his choice as High Sheriff for the remainder of the year. Often the other nominees were appointed as under-sheriffs. Sometimes a sheriff did not fulfil his entire term through death or other event and another sheriff was then appointed for the remainder of the year. The dates given hereunder are the dates of appointment. All addresses are in County Longford unless stated otherwise.

Longford was created in 1569.

== High Sheriffs of County Longford ==
- 1590: Fergus O'Farrell
- 1611: Robert Bellingham
- 1623: Sir Richard Browne, 1st Baronet
- 1646: John Edgeworth of Cranallagh Castle
- 1655: James Shaen
- 1680: Charles Fox of Fox Hall
- 1681: Charles Adare
- 1686: James Nugent
- 1692: Charles Fox of Fox Hall
- 1696: Mathew Wilder of Castle Wilder
- 1698: Anthony Sheppard
- Redmund Mulledy

== 18th century ==
- 1711: Henry Edgeworth of Lissard
- 1712: Cornelius George Holmes of Liscloony
- 1727: Henry Edgeworth
- 1730: William Wilder of Castle Wilder
- 1731: Galbraith Holmes of Ballinlough
- 1734: Anthony Sheppard of Newcastle
- 1736: Peyton Fox
- 1737: Charles Fox of Foxhall
- 1738: George Holmes of Castle Holmes of Ballinlough
- 1742: Richard Edgeworth
- 1750: Francis Fox
- 1756: Ralph Fetherston, later Sir Ralph Fetherston, 1st Baronet of Ardagh
- 1757: Henry Edgeworth of Lissard
- 1761: John Sankey of New Park
- 1765: Henry Gore of Tenelick
- 1768: George Holmes of Ballinlough
- 1769: Peter Beatty of Spring Park
- 1770: John McVitty of Cantons
- 1774: Matthew Wilder of Castle Wilder
- 1777: John Jessop of Doory Hall
- 1778: Freke Lennon of Liscormick
- 1781: Sir Thomas Fetherston, 2nd Baronet of Ardagh
- 1782: Lewis Montfort, of Middletown
- 1783: John Kirkland of Drumming
- 1784: William Henry Slator of Whitehill
- 1785: Samuel Wilkinson of Mount Pleasant
- 1786:
- 1789: Samuel Auchmuty
- 1794: William Bond of Edgworthstown
- 1795: Caleb Barnes Harman
- 1798: Matthew Carlisle Wilder of Castle Wilder
- 1799: Alexander Kingston

== 19th century ==
- 1800: William Thompson
- 1801: The Hon. Sir Thomas Gleadowe-Newcomen, 2nd Baronet of Carrickglass
- 1802: Robert Holmes of Willbrook
- 1803:
- 1804: Thomas Coates
- 1805: Thomas Lennon
- 1806: Luke White and Richard Ledwith
- 1807: Richard Ledwith
- 1808: Daniel Murray
- 1809: John Robinson
- 1810: James Gregg
- 1811: Achmuty Richardson
- 1812: William Atkinson
- 1813: Thomas Coates
- 1814–1815: Thomas Newcombe Edgeworth
- 1816–1817: Alexander Burrowes
- 1818: Richard Fox
- 1819: Lovel Edgeworth of Edgeworthstown
- 1820: Robert Blackall
- 1821: Luke White, jnr
- 1822: James Wensley Bond
- 1823: John Dopping of Derrycassan
- 1824: John Thompson, of Clonfin
- 1825: Thomas Achmuty, of Longford
- 1826: William Frederick Kingstone
- 1827: James Barber, Moss Vale, Edgeworthstown
- 1828: William Lloyd Galbraith, of Carrickrone, Edgeworthstown.
- 1829:MOLYNEUX WILLIAM SHULDHAM, of Ballymulvey [Moigh] born 1784, death 1846.
- 1831: Barry Fox
- 1832: Willoughby Bond of Farragh
- 1833: Samuel Wensley Blackhall, jnr, of Corlamber
- 1834: Sir George Ralph Fetherston, 3rd Baronet of Ardagh
- 1835: Frederick Thomas Jessop of Mount Jessop (committed suicide 1836 while in office)
- 1836: Sir Percy Fitzgerald Nugent, 1st Baronet
- 1837: Hugh Morgan Tuite of Sonna
- 1840: Samuel Galbraith
- 1840–1844: Captain Thomas Hussey of Castlecor
- 1842: Hon. Lawrence H. King Harman of Newcastle, Ballymahon
- 1845: George Thomson Lefroy, of Carrickglass
- 1846: George Maconchy
- 1848: E. Ledwith of Ledwithstown, Ballymahon
- 1849: Anthony Lefroy of Carrickglass
- 1850: John Shuldham, of Moigh House, Ballymahon
- 1851: Henry Bevan Slator (later Wilson-Slator) of White Hill.
- 1853: John Harwood of Marlfield.
- 1854: Arthur Gambell Lewis.
- 1855:
- 1856: John Bond of Castlecor.
- 1857:
- 1858: Sir Thomas John Fetherston, 5th Baronet.
- 1859: Ralph Anthony Dopping-Hepenstall of Derrycassan.
- 1860: John Stratford Kirwan of Bawn, Longford.
- 1861: Henry Dopping, Erne Hall, Granard.
- 1862: Walter Nugent, Donore, Multifarnham.
- 1864: James Wilson of Currygrane.
- 1865: John Edward Thompson of Clonfin.
- 1866: Henry William White of Southwell, County Longford
- 1867: Joseph Richard O'Reilly.
- 1868: Nathaniel Hone Dyas of Athboy House & Staholmack, County Meath.
- 1869: Philip O'Reilly of Colamber, Westmeath.
- 1870: James Willoughby Bond of Farragh.
- 1871: Luke White, 2nd Baron Annaly of Annaly and Rathcline.
- 1872:
- 1873: Arthur Shirley Ball of Cabbaglair.
- 1874: John Samuel Galbraith of Clanabogan and Riverstown.
- 1875: George Huband Gregg
- 1876: William John Fitzpatrick.
- 1877: George Warner Slator (later Wilson-Slator) of White Hill.
- 1878: James Vokes Mackey of Kilsallagh.
- 1879: John Porter-Porter of Belle Isle.
- 1880:
- 1882: Edward Gerald More-O'Ferrall of Balyna, Kildare and Lisard.
- 1883:
- 1885: Maxwell Fox of Annaghmore.
- 1888: Sir George Errington, 1st Baronet of Lackham House, Wiltshire.
- 1889:
- 1890: Antonio Eroles Edgeworth of Edworthstown.
- 1891: William Alexander White of Chandos.
- 1892: Thomas Langlois Hugh Lefroy
- 1893: Edward Skeffington Randal Smyth, of Mount Henry.
- 1894: Henry Armstrong.
- 1895: Molyneux William Shuldham of Ballymulvey (Moigh House) and Ballymahon, County Longford.
- 1896: Wentworth Henry King-Harman of Newcastle, County Longford.
- 1897: Sir George Ralph Fetherston, 6th Baronet.

== 20th century ==
- 1903: John Arthur Maconchy.
- 1904:
- 1905: Willoughby James Bond.
- 1906: Charles James Clerk of Castlecor.
- 1908: Henry Bevan Wilson-Slator of Edgeworthstown.
- 1909: Augustine Hugh Lefroy of Carrigglas Manor.
- 1910: Lambert John Dopping-Hepenstall of Altadore Castle.
