= William Pollard-Urquhart =

Irish politician and writer

Member of Parliament for County Westmeath
- In office 1852–1857 Serving with William Magan
- Preceded by: William Magan; Sir Percy Nugent
- Succeeded by: William Magan; Sir Richard Levinge

Member of Parliament for Westmeath
- In office 1859–1871 Serving with: Sir Richard Levinge 1859–1865; Hon. Algernon Greville-Nugent 1865–1871
- Preceded by: William Magan; Sir Richard Levinge
- Succeeded by: Hon. Algernon Greville-Nugent; Patrick James Smyth

Personal details
- Born: 19 June 1815 Kinturk, County Westmeath, Ireland
- Died: 1 June 1871 (aged 55) Brighton, Sussex, England
- Party: Liberal

William Pollard-Urquhart (19 June 1815 – 1 June 1871), was an Irish politician and writer specialising in economic and policy questions of his day. He served as high sheriff of County Westmeath, and sat as Member of Parliament for the county.

== Early life ==
Urquhart, eldest child of William Dutton Pollard (1789–1839), of Kinturk, Castlepollard, County Westmeath, by his second wife, Louisa Anne, eldest daughter of Admiral Sir Thomas Pakenham, was born at Kinturk on 19 June 1815. He was educated at Harrow and at Trinity College, Cambridge, graduating BA as eighteenth wrangler in 1838, and M.A. in 1843. He kept his terms at the Inner Temple, but was never called to the bar.

== Career ==
In 1840 he was gazetted High Sheriff of Westmeath, and in 1846, on his marriage, took by royal licence the additional name of Urquhart. He sat in parliament for County Westmeath as a liberal from 1852 to 1857, and from 1859 to his death.

== Personal life ==
On 20 August 1846, he married Mary Isabella, the only daughter of William Urquhart of Craigston Castle, Aberdeenshire. Their second son, Francis Edward Romulus Pollard Urquhart (born 1848), became a major in the Royal Horse Artillery in 1886.

He died at 19 Brunswick Terrace, Brighton, on 1 June 1871.

== Works ==
Pollard-Urquhart was the author of:

- Agricultural Distress and its Remedies (Aberdeen, 1850)
- Essays on Subjects of Political Economy (1850)
- The Substitution of Direct for Indirect Taxation necessary to carry out the Policy of Free Trade (1851),
- Life and Times of Francisco Sforza, Duke of Milan (Edinburgh, 1852, 2 vols; adversely criticised by the ‘Athenæum’)
- A short Account of the Prussian Land Credit Companies, with Suggestions for the Formation of a Land Credit Company in Ireland (Dublin, 1853)
- The Currency Question and the Bank Charter Committees of 1857 and 1858 reviewed. By an M.P. (1860)
- Dialogues on Taxation, local and imperial (1867).

Parliament of the United Kingdom
Preceded by William Magan; Sir Percy Nugent	Member of Parliament for County Westmeath; 1852–1857; With: William Magan	Succeeded by William Magan; Sir Richard Levinge
Preceded by William Magan; Sir Richard Levinge	Member of Parliament for County Westmeath; 1859–1871; With: Sir Richard Levinge 1859–1865; Hon. Algernon Greville-Nugent 1865–1871	Succeeded by Hon. Algernon Greville-Nugent; Patrick James Smyth
Honorary titles
Preceded by Richard Winter Reynell	High Sheriff of Westmeath; 1840	Succeeded by Cuthbert Fetherstonhaugh
