= Delvin =

Village in County Westmeath, Ireland

Delvin Dealbhna or Dealbhna Mhór
- Village
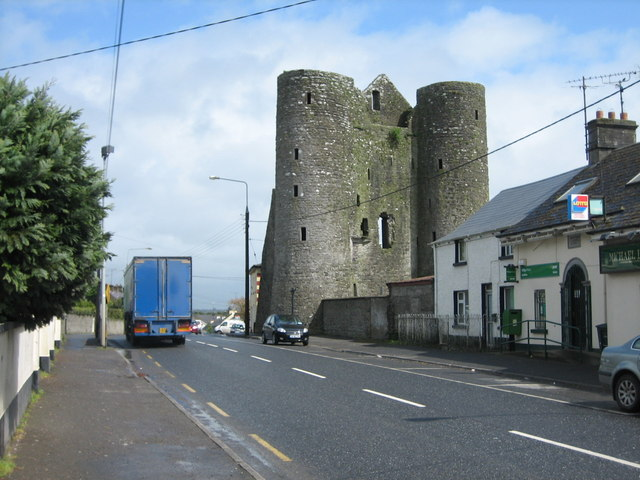
- Delvin Castle (Nugent Castle) on the village's main street

- Location in Ireland
- Coordinates: 53°36′38″N 7°05′33″W
- Country: Ireland
- Province: Leinster
- County: County Westmeath

Government
  - Dáil Éireann: Longford–Westmeath
  - EU Parliament: Midlands–North-West
- Elevation: 115 m (377 ft)

Population (2016)
  - Total: 740
- Time zone: UTC+0 (WET)
  - Summer (DST): UTC−1 (IST (WEST))
- Irish Grid Reference: N601626

Delvin (Irish: Dealbhna or Dealbhna Mhór) is a village in County Westmeath, Ireland; it is located on the N52 road at a junction with the N51 to Navan. The village is 20 km (12 mi) from Mullingar (along the N52).

The word Delvin comes from Delbhna. That tribe settled in what is present-day Delvin, along with a branch of the Soghain, in Tricha céd na Delbna Móire agus na Sogan.

== Delvin Castle and Clonyn Castle ==
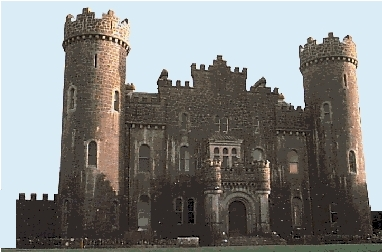
Clonyn Castle

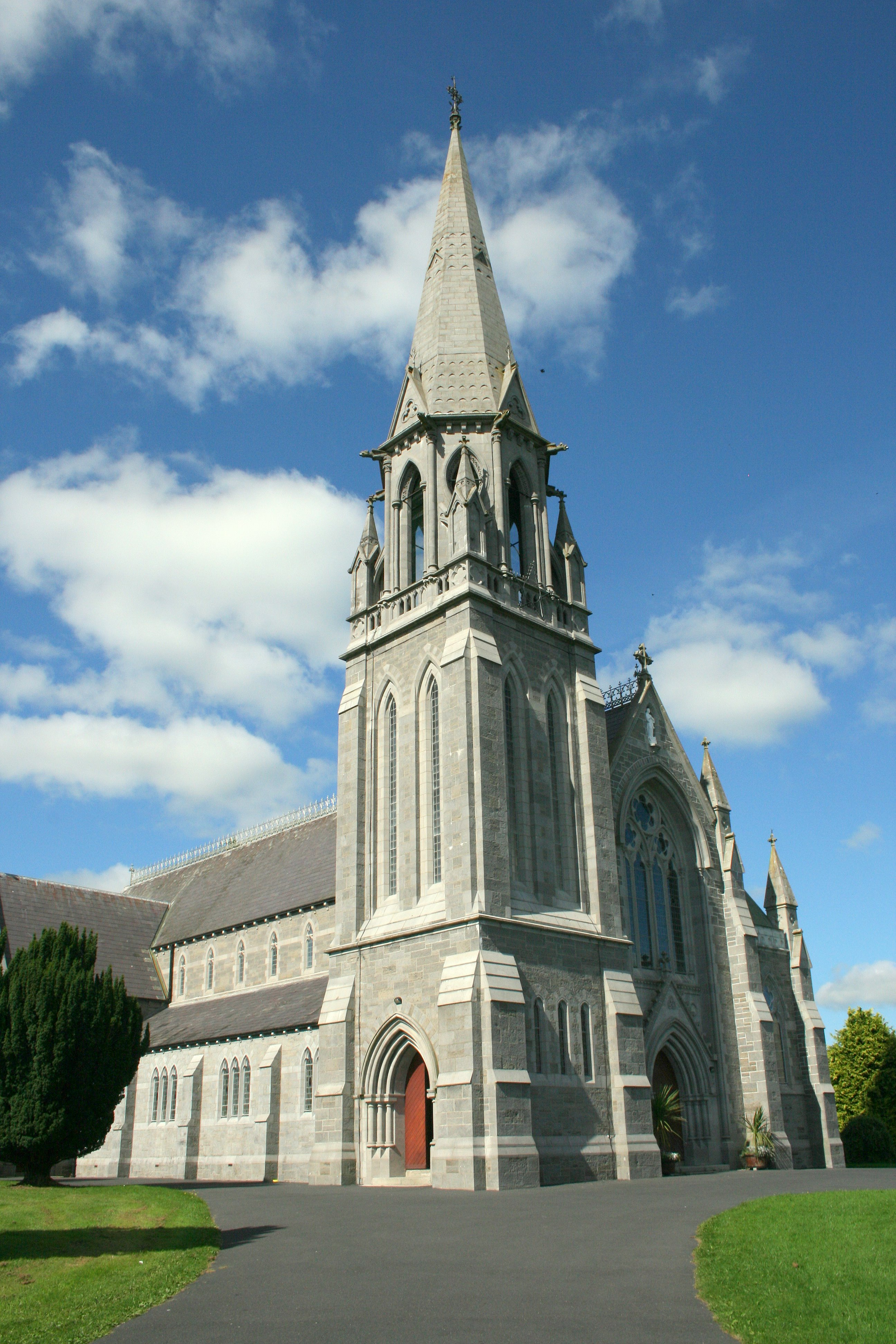
Church of the Assumption, Delvin (1881)

Delvin Castle (or Nugent Castle), now a ruin, was built in 1181 by Hugh de Lacy, Lord of Meath for his brother-in-law, Gilbert de Nugent. De Nugent came to Ireland with de Lacy in 1171 and settled on some land in Delvin. De Nugent was granted the title Baron of Delvin within the Lordship of Meath, a title now held by the Earl of Westmeath. The ruins of Nugent Castle (not publicly accessible) remain near the centre of the village.

A second castle was built several centuries later, hundreds of metres from the centre of the Delvin settlement of that time. This building, known as Clonyn Castle, is situated south of Delvin between the N52 and the Collinstown road. Built in the mid-19th century, by Lord and Lady Greville Nugent, it was sold by the Nugent family in 1922. Changing hands several times during the 20th century, it is now a private residence.

== Amenities ==
The 18-hole Delvin Castle Golf Club is located near the village.

Between the 2002 and 2016 census, the population of the village more than doubled from 270 to 740 people. In addition to other developments, plans were unveiled for the provision of a new sports and leisure facility within the village To date, a walking track, floodlit football pitch and basic changing facilities have been provided on site.

== Education ==
National (primary) schools in the area include St. Patrick's (Crowenstown), St. Tola's (Hiskinstown), and St. Ernan's National Schools.

== People ==
- Sir Thomas Chapman, 7th Baronet, landowner and father of T. E. Lawrence, was brought up at a large manor house near Delvin
- Laurence Ginnell, nationalist politician, was also from Delvin
- Brinsley MacNamara, writer and Delvin native, set the 1918 novel Valley of the Squinting Windows in Delvin (under the fictitious name of "Garradrimna")
- Mary McEvoy, actress who played Biddy Byrne in Glenroe is from Delvin
