= Killua Castle =

Country house in County Westmeath, Ireland

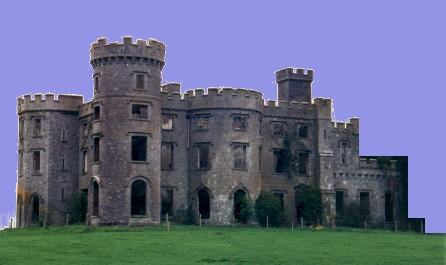
- Killua Castle prior to its 21st century restoration

- Location within Ireland

General information
- Coordinates: 53.65954°N 6.99621°W
- Completed: 1780s
- Renovated: 2006
- Owner: Montpascal Foundation, the family foundation of the Krause family

Design and construction
- Developer: Sir Benjamin Chapman, 1st Baronet

Killua Castle, and the nearby Raleigh Obelisk, are situated near Clonmellon, County Westmeath, Ireland. The present house was built in about 1780 by Sir Benjamin Chapman and consisted of a hall, dining room, oval drawing room, breakfast parlour and front and back stairs. There was also a stable yard, barn and haggard (an enclosure where crops are stored). From here, the Chapmans administered the surrounding farm lands of some 9,000 acres (36 km^{2}) in the 18th century. It was renovated in 2006, having fallen into a ruinous condition.

== History ==
Killua Castle and its surrounding lands were granted around 1667 to Benjamin Chapman, a captain in Cromwell's army, having been confiscated from the Knights Hospitallers of St John. On his death the estate passed to his elder son, William, and on William's death in 1734 to his son Benjamin. Benjamin died in 1779 and was succeeded by his son Benjamin, who was created a baronet.

The present structure was built in 1780 by Sir Benjamin Chapman, 1st Baronet after demolishing the original castle. The castle was passed from him in 1810 by special remainder to his brother Thomas who in the early 1820s commissioned the addition of a large round tower and several other towers, including a library tower, staircase tower and back door tower. He also completed the castellation and erected the Raleigh obelisk nearby. He was succeeded in 1837 by his son Sir Montagu Chapman, 3rd Baronet, who was lost at sea off the coast of Australia in 1852. Montagu's brother Benjamin, the 4th baronet, inherited, from whom it passed to his son Montagu Richard, 5th baronet. Montagu Richard died childless in 1907 and his widow, a cousin, divided the estate between the four legitimate daughters of her brother Sir Thomas Chapman, 7th Baronet, the father of T. E. Lawrence of Arabia. The house and the remaining 1,200 acres (4.9 km^{2}) of land were sold in 1949.

== Raleigh Obelisk ==
Sir Walter Raleigh Plaque, erected by Sir Thoman Chapman, 1810 (the "G" is probably vandalism).

The obelisk, erected in 1810 by Sir Thomas Chapman some 200m to 300m from the house, marks the position where Sir Walter Raleigh planted some of the first potatoes that he imported to Ireland. Antoine Parmentier who promoted the cultivation of potatoes for human consumption and the Spanish conquistadores who first imported them from South America along the south and west Irish coast are also associated with Irish potato promotion. However, it is uncertain who is initially responsible of the first potato plantation in Ireland, even though Raleigh is frequently credited with this milestone in Irish history.

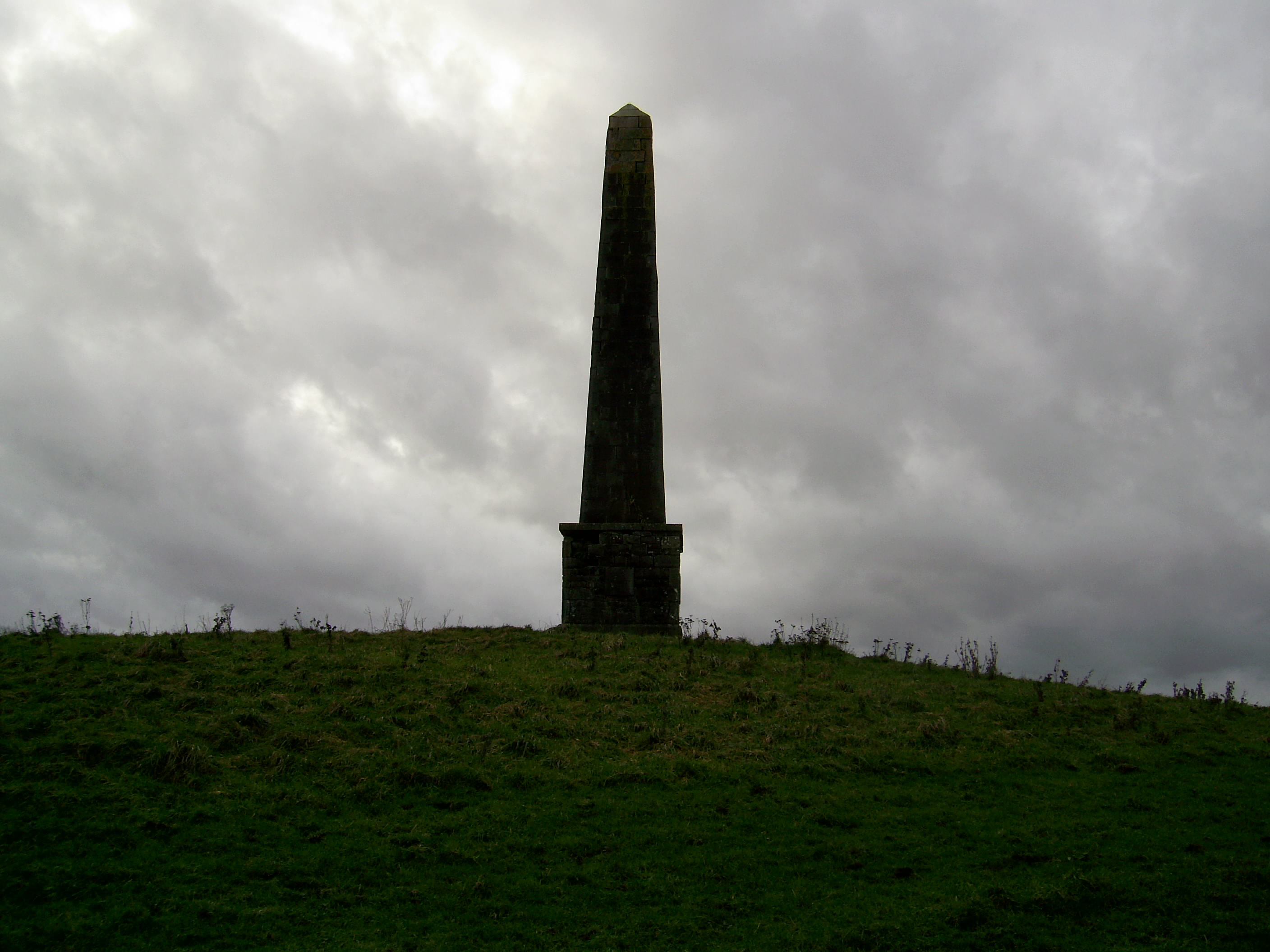
Sir Walter Raleigh Commemoration Obelisk, erected by the Chapmans in 1810

The inscription on the obelisk currently reads "Sir Walter G. Raleigh," but there is no other evidence that Raleigh had a middle name, and the "G" appears to be vandalism added after the original inscription.

The obelisk has since been restored through a grant from the Irish Georgian Society.

An earlier obelisk also appears to have been constructed on the estate dedicated to Lord Nelson around 1806-07.

== Other Westmeath castles ==
- Ballinlough Castle
- Clonyn Castle aka Delvin Castle
- Knockdrin Castle
- Tullynally Castle
- Tyrrellspass Castle
