= Knockdrin =

Townland in County Westmeath, Ireland

Coordinates: 53°34′25″N 7°18′54″W

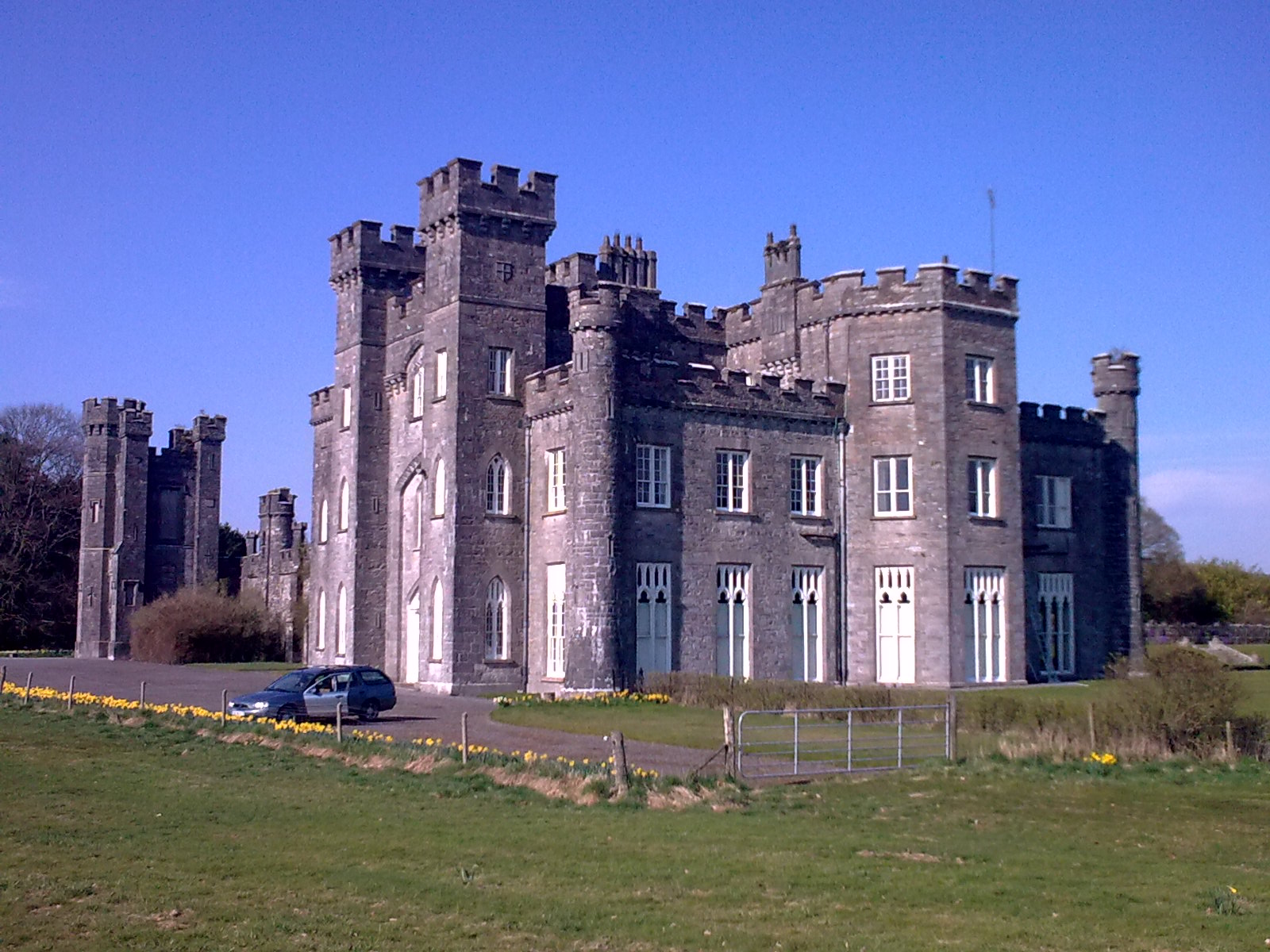
Knockdrin Castle, just north of Mullingar

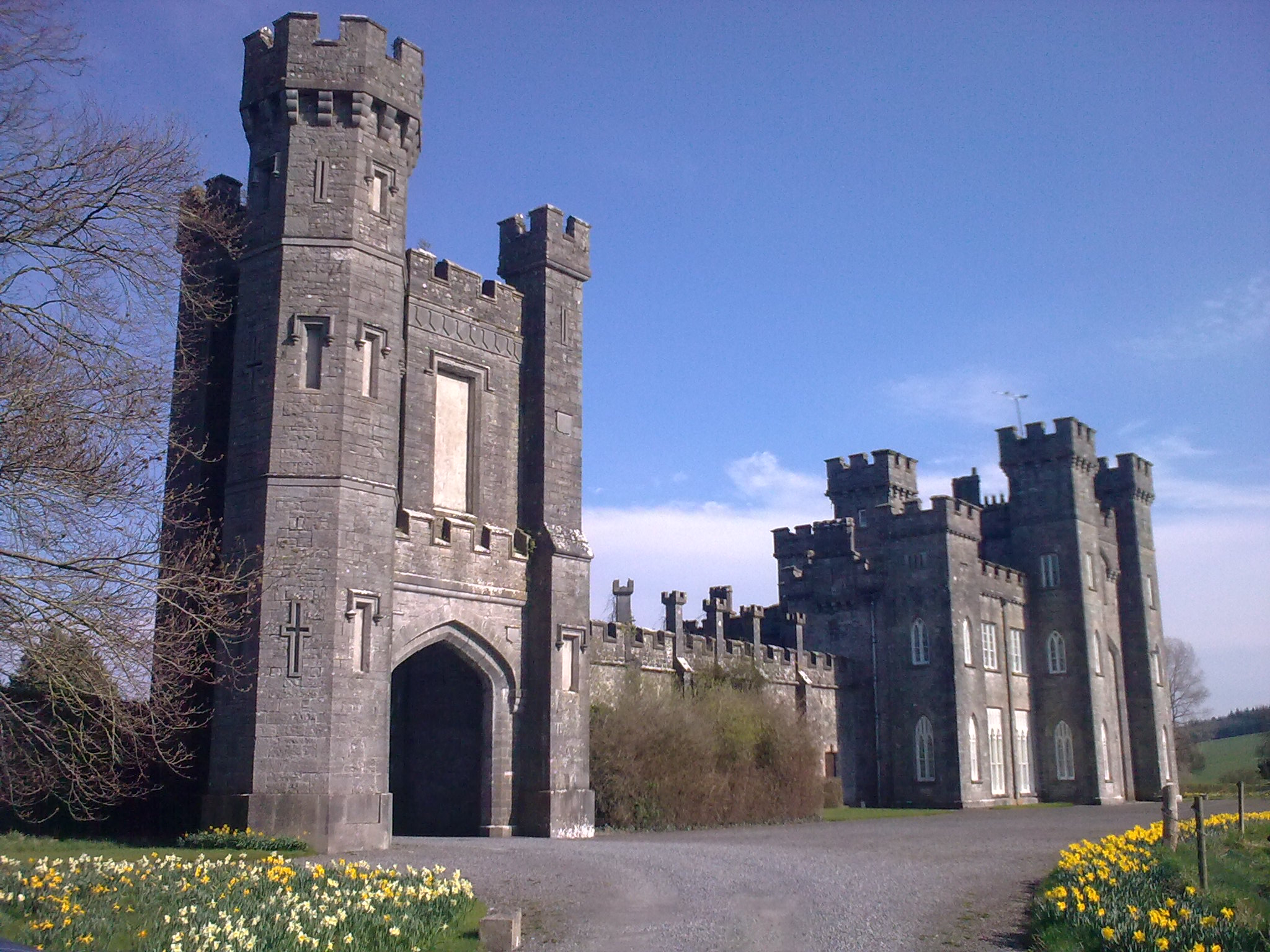
Knockdrin viewed from left

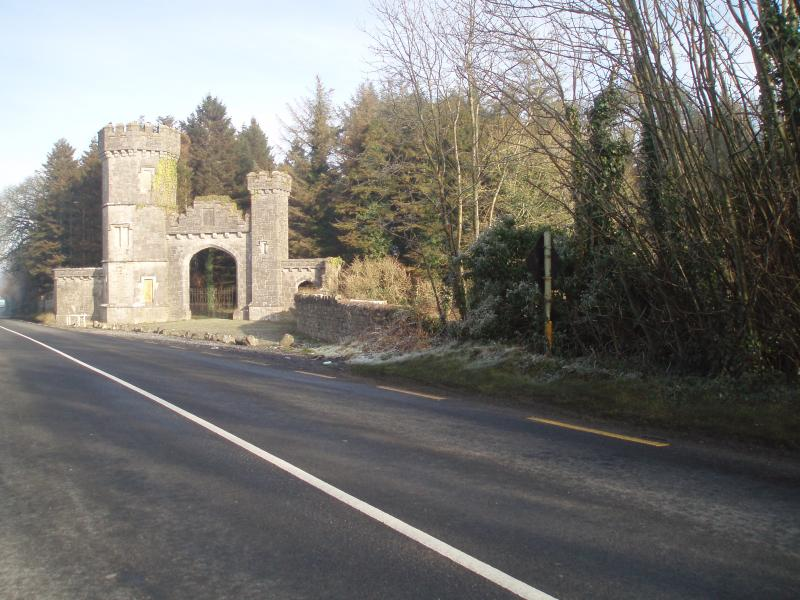
Gatehouse and main gate to Knockdrin Castle on the R394 road between Mullingar and Castlepollard

Knockdrin (Irish: Cnoc Droinne) is a townland and electoral division that is 5.6 kilometers northeast of Mullingar, in County Westmeath, Ireland. It is the home of the Westmeath Hunt, and its most notable building is Knockdrin Castle. The R394 regional road, the main Mullingar to Castlepollard route, runs through the area.

== Etymology ==
The name Knockdrin (Irish: Cnoc Droinne meaning 'hill of Drin') reputedly derives from a hill on the estate. This is also reflected to Lough Drin, a small lake on the estate. The Irish name for the locality is Muine Liath (pronounced Moe in ah lee ah), which means 'grey thicket'. Muine Liath is written in English as Monilea.

== Knockdrin Castle ==
Knockdrin Castle is, according to The Buildings of Ireland: North Leinster (published in London in 1993 and better known as the Pevsner Guide to North Leinster), mainly an early 19th-century neo-Gothic structure. The current castle was constructed for Sir Richard Levinge, 6th Baronet (1785-1848), in the late 18th century, and the current structure was probably completed by 1820.

According to a National Inventory survey, parts of a surviving gate structure may be from an "earlier eighteenth century house [that] stood on the site (known as 'High Park')".

The National Inventory considers the castle as "one of finest picturesque castellated country houses built in Ireland during the first half of the nineteenth century ... retains its early character, form and fabric". The summary adds that there are many outbuildings, including an area that "incorporates the remains of a Late Medieval tower house, built c.1550".

According to some sources, the castle was designed by Richard Morrison, and was built on the site of High Park, the original 18th-century mansion that formerly stood there. According to the National Inventory, however, Levinge did not accept the two designs proposed by Morrison and that the final plan may have been by James Shiel. Another reliable source also confirms that the structure is credited to James Shiel, "assistant to Francis Johnston, one of Ireland’s best known Gothic Revival architects ... although elements of the front facade have been attributed to Morrison’s design".

From 1961 to late 2020, the castle was the home of the von Prondzynski family. The last member of the family to be the owner, Professor Ferdinand von Prondzynski, was President of Dublin City University from 2000 until mid-2010, and then Principal and Vice-Chancellor of Robert Gordon University (RGU), Aberdeen, Scotland. In December 2020 the castle and the greater part of the estate was bought by entrepreneurial couple Noel and Valerie Moran. Ferdinand von Prondzynski continues to own the remainder of the property.

=== History ===
Until the early 18th century, the main residence on the estate was a small Norman castle (often known locally as 'King John's Castle') which was destroyed by fire. The main part of High Park, the first mansion that stood on the site of the current Knockdrin Castle, may have been built in the early 18th century for Sir Richard Levinge, 1st Baronet, M.P. (1656-1724).

The Levinges came to Ireland with the Williamites, in the late 17th century. The first Sir Richard Levinge was Chief Justice of the Common Pleas and a member of the Lords Commissioners, who were appointed by the British Crown to settle all the land questions which had arisen in Ireland after the Cromwellian conquest, the Restoration and the Williamite Wars. Levinge took advantage of his position to purchase the Knockdrin Estate from the Tuites, who were the Norman-Irish owners up to that time. At the time the estate was over 12,000 acres (49 km^{2}) in size. As of late 2020, the estate was approximately 1,000 acres (4.0 km^{2}).

During the Irish War of Independence, Sir Winston Churchill stayed at the castle, in a bedroom now known as the Crown Bedroom.

During the Emergency (WWII), the castle was taken over for troop accommodation and was occupied by a company of the 6th Infantry of the Irish Army. The army left in 1945 and handed the castle back to the Levinges. The Levinges owned Knockdrin until 1946, although the last Sir Richard Levinge to live there (later a director of Guinness Ltd) had by then not been resident there for some time.

In 1946, the estate was sold to Paddy Dunne-Cullinan, who remained there until 1961, when he in turn sold the estate to Hans Freiherr von Prondzynski from Germany.

Significant changes to the castle had taken place by August 2020 when the description included this information:

"twelve bedrooms and five bathrooms, a top-lit staircase made of carved oak, its own gallery decorated with fluted shafts and ogee-headed niches around the walls, reception rooms, a spacious dining room, ballroom, and a library. It also comes with commercial woodland, arable lands, and a small lake.

Another report, in September 2020, stated that major repairs had been completed, 50 years earlier and that the castle was "structurally in good repair but, given the passage of time, requires upgrading". The property was subsequently sold "to the Meath-based entrepreneurial couple", Noel and Valerie Moran, previous owners of Prepaid Financial Services. They were planning an extensive restoration of the castle and outbuildings.

== Other castles in County Westmeath ==
- Ballinlough Castle
- Clonyn Castle aka Delvin Castle
- Killua Castle
- Tullynally Castle
- Tyrrellspass Castle
