= County Westmeath (UK Parliament constituency) =

UK parliamentary constituency in Ireland, 1801–1885 and 1918–1922

- Former county constituency for the House of Commons
- County: County Westmeath

1801–1885
- Seats: 2
- Created from: County Westmeath (IHC)
- Replaced by: North Westmeath and South Westmeath

1918–1922
- Seats: 1
- Created from: North Westmeath and South Westmeath
- Replaced by: Longford–Westmeath (Dáil Éireann)

County Westmeath is a former UK Parliament constituency in Ireland, returning two Members of Parliament from 1801 to 1885 and one from 1918 to 1922.

== Boundaries ==
This constituency comprised County Westmeath, except for the parliamentary borough of Athlone 1801–1885.

== Members of Parliament ==
=== MPs 1801–1885 ===
Year	First member	First party	Second member	Second party
1801, 1 January	William Smyth		Gustavus Hume Rochfort	Tory
1808, 27 February	Hon. Hercules Robert Pakenham	Tory	Gustavus Hume Rochfort	Tory
1812, 24 October	Hon. Hercules Robert Pakenham	Tory	Gustavus Hume Rochfort	Tory
1824, 3 March	Hon. Hercules Robert Pakenham	Tory	Robert Smyth	Tory
1826, 22 June	Gustavus Rochfort	Tory	Hugh Morgan Tuite	Whig
1830, 12 August	Gustavus Rochfort	Tory	Sir Montagu Chapman, Bt	Whig
1832, 20 December	Sir Richard Nagle, Bt	Repeal Association	Sir Montagu Chapman, Bt	Whig
1841, 12 July	Hugh Morgan Tuite	Whig	Benjamin Chapman	Whig
1847, 10 August	William Henry Magan	Repeal Association	Sir Percy Nugent, Bt	Whig
1852, 22 July	William Henry Magan	Ind. Irish	William Pollard-Urquhart	Ind. Irish
1857, 3 April	William Henry Magan	Whig	Sir Richard Levinge, Bt.	Ind. Irish
1859, 10 May	William Pollard-Urquhart	Liberal	Sir Richard Levinge, Bt.	Liberal
1865, 20 July	William Pollard-Urquhart	Liberal	Hon. Algernon Greville-Nugent (later Baron Greville)	Liberal
1871, 17 July	Patrick James Smyth	Home Rule	Hon. Algernon Greville-Nugent (later Baron Greville)	Liberal
1874, 13 February	Patrick James Smyth	Home Rule	Lord Robert Montagu	Home Rule
1880, 13 April	Timothy Daniel Sullivan	Parnellite Home Rule League	Henry Joseph Gill	Parnellite Home Rule League
Oct 1882	Timothy Daniel Sullivan	Irish Parliamentary	Henry Joseph Gill	Irish Parliamentary
1883, 27 February	Timothy Daniel Sullivan	Irish Parliamentary	Timothy Harrington	Irish Parliamentary
1885	Constituency abolished: see North Westmeath and South Westmeath			

=== MPs 1918–1922 ===
Election	Member	Party
1918	Laurence Ginnell	Sinn Féin
1922	constituency abolished	

== Elections ==
=== Elections in the 1830s ===
General election 1830: Westmeath (2 seats)
Party	Candidate	Votes	%	±%
Tory	Gustavus Rochfort	353	36.3	
Whig	Montagu Chapman	336	34.5	
Whig	Hugh Morgan Tuite	198	20.3	
Whig	Gerald Dease	86	8.8	
Turnout		c. 487	c. 75.9	
Registered electors		641		
Majority		17	1.8	
Tory hold		Swing		
Majority		138	14.2	
Whig hold		Swing		

General election 1831: Westmeath (2 seats)
Party	Candidate	Votes	%
Tory	Gustavus Rochfort	Unopposed	
Whig	Montagu Chapman	Unopposed	
Registered electors		641	
Tory hold			
Whig hold			

General election 1832: Westmeath (2 seats)
Party	Candidate	Votes	%
Whig	Sir Montagu Chapman, 3rd Baronet	385	33.1
Repeal	Sir Richard Nagle, 2nd Baronet	381	32.8
Tory	Gustavus Rochfort	238	20.5
Tory	Gustavus Lambert	159	13.7
Turnout		c. 582	c. 41.7
Registered electors		1,395	
Majority		4	0.3
Whig hold			
Majority		143	12.3
Repeal gain from Tory			

General election 1835: Westmeath (2 seats)
Party	Candidate	Votes	%
Whig	Montagu Chapman	Unopposed	
Repeal (Whig)	Sir Richard Nagle, 2nd Baronet	Unopposed	
Registered electors		1,525	
Whig hold			
Repeal hold			

General election 1837: Westmeath (2 seats)
Party	Candidate	Votes	%
Whig	Montagu Chapman	804	33.7
Repeal (Whig)	Sir Richard Nagle, 2nd Baronet	798	33.5
Conservative	Richard Handcock	393	16.5
Conservative	Richard Levinge	388	16.3
Turnout		c. 1,192	c. 71.9
Registered electors		1,658	
Majority		6	0.2
Whig hold			
Majority		405	17.0
Repeal hold			

=== Elections in the 1840s ===
General election 1841: Westmeath (2 seats)
Party	Candidate	Votes	%	±%
Whig	Hugh Morgan Tuite	Unopposed		
Whig	Benjamin Chapman	Unopposed		
Registered electors		1,125		
Whig hold				
Whig gain from Repeal				

General election 1847: Westmeath (2 seats)
Party	Candidate	Votes	%	±%
Repeal	William Henry Magan	118	50.2	New
Whig	Percy Nugent	117	49.8	N/A
Conservative	Richard Levinge	0	0.0	New
Majority		117	0.4	N/A
Turnout		118 (est)	8.8 (est)	N/A
Registered electors		1,337		
Repeal gain from Whig		Swing	N/A	
Whig hold		Swing	N/A	

=== Elections in the 1850s ===
General election 1852: Westmeath (2 seats)
Party	Candidate	Votes	%	±%
Independent Irish	William Henry Magan	1,647	41.3	−8.9
Independent Irish	William Pollard-Urquhart	1,414	35.5	N/A
Conservative	Richard Levinge	926	23.2	+23.2
Majority		488	12.3	+11.9
Turnout		2,457 (est)	78.4 (est)	+69.6
Registered electors		3,132		
Independent Irish gain from Repeal		Swing	−16.1	
Independent Irish gain from Whig		Swing		

General election 1857: Westmeath (2 seats)
Party	Candidate	Votes	%	±%
Whig	William Henry Magan	Unopposed		
Independent Irish	Richard Levinge	Unopposed		
Registered electors		3,520		
Whig gain from Independent Irish				
Independent Irish hold				

General election 1859: Westmeath (2 seats)
Party	Candidate	Votes	%	±%
Liberal	William Pollard-Urquhart	Unopposed		
Liberal	Richard Levinge	Unopposed		
Registered electors		3,678		
Liberal hold				
Liberal hold				

=== Elections in the 1860s ===
General election 1865: Westmeath (2 seats)
Party	Candidate	Votes	%	±%
Liberal	Algernon Greville	Unopposed		
Liberal	William Pollard-Urquhart	Unopposed		
Registered electors		3,568		
Liberal hold				
Liberal hold				

General election 1868: Westmeath (2 seats)
Party	Candidate	Votes	%	±%
Liberal	Algernon Greville-Nugent	Unopposed		
Liberal	William Pollard-Urquhart	Unopposed		
Registered electors		3,884		
Liberal hold				
Liberal hold				

Greville-Nugent was appointed a Groom in Waiting to Queen Victoria, requiring a by-election.

By-election, 7 January 1869: Westmeath
Party	Candidate	Votes	%	±%
Liberal	Algernon Greville-Nugent	Unopposed		
Registered electors		3,884		
Liberal hold				

=== Elections in the 1870s ===
Pollard-Urquhart's death caused a by-election.

By-election, 17 Jun 1871: Westmeath (1 seat)
Party	Candidate	Votes	%	±%
Home Rule	Patrick James Smyth	Unopposed		
Registered electors		3,616		
Home Rule gain from Liberal				

General election 1874: Westmeath (2 seats)
Party	Candidate	Votes	%	±%
Home Rule	Patrick James Smyth	2,202	43.2	N/A
Home Rule	Robert Montagu	2,164	42.5	N/A
Liberal	Algernon Greville-Nugent	401	7.9	N/A
Liberal	Richard Levinge	328	6.4	N/A
Majority		1,763	34.6	N/A
Turnout		2,548 (est)	71.6 (est)	N/A
Registered electors		3,559		
Home Rule gain from Liberal		Swing	N/A	
Home Rule gain from Liberal		Swing	N/A	

=== Elections in the 1880s ===
General election 1880: Westmeath (2 seats)
Party	Candidate	Votes	%	±%
Parnellite Home Rule League	Timothy Daniel Sullivan	1,631	48.2	N/A
Parnellite Home Rule League	Henry Joseph Gill	1,609	47.6	N/A
Home Rule	William A Gowing	141	4.2	N/A
Majority		1,468	43.4	+8.8
Turnout		1,761 (est)	50.8 (est)	−20.8
Registered electors		3,465		
Home Rule hold		Swing	N/A	
Home Rule hold		Swing	N/A	

Gill resigned, causing a by-election.

By-election, 24 Feb 1883: Westmeath (1 seat)
Party	Candidate	Votes	%	±%
Irish Parliamentary	Timothy Harrington	Unopposed		
Registered electors		3,395		
Irish Parliamentary hold				

=== Election in the 1910s ===
1918 general election: Westmeath
Party	Candidate	Votes	%	±%
Sinn Féin	Laurence Ginnell	12,435	75.4	
Irish Parliamentary	Patrick Weymes	3,458	21.0	
Ind. Nationalist	Walter Nugent	603	3.6	
Majority		8,977	54.4	
Turnout		16,496	68.7	
Registered electors		24,014		
Sinn Féin win (new seat)				
