= Levinge baronets =

Baronetcy in the Baronetage of Ireland

- Escutcheon of the Levinge baronets
- Creation date: 1704
- Status: extant
- Motto: Vistigia nulla retrorsum, No footsteps backwards

The Levinge Baronetcy, of High Park in the County of Westmeath, is a title in the Baronetage of Ireland. It was created on 26 October 1704 for Richard Levinge, Speaker of the Irish House of Commons and Lord Chief Justice of the Irish Court of Common Pleas. The seventh Baronet sat as Liberal Member of Parliament for County Westmeath from 1857 to 1865.

The family seat was Knockdrin Castle, County Westmeath.

== Levinge baronets, of High Park (1704) ==
- Sir Richard Levinge, 1st Baronet (1656–1724)
- Sir Richard Levinge, 2nd Baronet (c. 1690–1748)
- Sir Charles Levinge, 3rd Baronet (1693–1762)
- Sir Richard Levinge, 4th Baronet (c. 1723–1786)
- Sir Charles Levinge, 5th Baronet (1751–1796)
- Sir Richard Levinge, 6th Baronet (1785–1848)
- Sir Richard George Augustus Levinge, 7th Baronet (1811–1884)
- Sir Vere Henry Levinge, 8th Baronet (1819–1885)
- Sir William Henry Levinge, 9th Baronet (1849–1900)
- Sir Richard William Levinge, 10th Baronet (1878–1914)
- Sir Richard Vere Henry Levinge, 11th Baronet (1911–1984)
- Sir Richard George Robin Levinge, 12th Baronet (1946–2025)
- Sir Richard Mark Levinge, 13th Baronet (born 1970)

The heir presumptive to the baronetcy is the present holder's younger half-brother Robin Edward Levinge (born 1978).
