= Chapman baronets =

Set index for Chapman baronets

There have been three baronetcies created for persons with the surname Chapman, one in the Baronetage of Great Britain, one in the Baronetage of Ireland and one in the Baronetage of the United Kingdom. Two of the creations are extinct, while as of 2026 one is extant.

- Chapman baronets of London (1720)
- Chapman baronets of Killua Castle (1782)
- Chapman baronets of Cleadon (1958)
