= Richard Handcock =

Richard Handcock may refer to:

- Richard Handcock, 2nd Baron Castlemaine (1767–1840), Irish MP for Athlone 1800–1801
- Richard Handcock, 3rd Baron Castlemaine (1791–1861), his son, British MP for Athlone 1826–1832, Irish representative peer
- Richard Handcock, 4th Baron Castlemaine (1826–1892), his son, Irish representative peer, Lord Lieutenant of Westmeath
- Richard Handcock (priest), Irish Anglican priest
