= William Handcock =

William Handcock may refer to:

- William Handcock (Westmeath politician) (c. 1631–1707), Irish MP for Westmeath 1661–1666, 1703–1707, Athlone 1692–1699
- William Handcock (1654–1701), Irish MP for Boyle and Dublin City, Recorder of Dublin, his son
- William Handcock (1676–1723), Irish MP for Athlone 1703–1714, Westmeath 1721–1723
- William Handcock (1704–1741), his son, Irish MP for Fore
- William Handcock (1737–1794), Irish MP for Athlone 1759–1783. his nephew
- William Handcock, 1st Viscount Castlemaine (1761–1839), Irish and British MP for Athlone 1783–1803
- William Handcock (Australian politician) (1808–1890), briefly a member of the New South Wales Legislative Assembly (1859)
