= John Collett =

John Collett may refer to:

- John A. Collett (1908–1942), namesake of the USS Collett, a World War II-era destroyer
- John Collett (artist) (1725–1780), English artist
- John Collett (composer) (c1735-1775), British violinist and composer
- John Collett (MP) (1798–1856), Irish Whig politician
