= Thomas Kelly (politician, born 1723) =

Irish politician, born 1723

Thomas Kelly (1723–1809) was an Irish barrister, judge and politician, who held the office of Serjeant-at-law (Ireland). He sat briefly in the Irish House of Commons and was then appointed a justice of the Court of Common Pleas (Ireland). In his own lifetime, his lack of legal learning was proverbial, but nonetheless, he was universally esteemed as a kindly and humane man. In the nineteenth century, his principal claim to fame lay in being the father of Thomas Kelly junior, a prolific writer of hymns and founder of a breakaway Protestant sect.

== Early life ==
He was born at Fidane, in County Galway, third son of Edmond Kelly, or O'Kelly, a minor landowner, and Margery Bourke. His family were traditionally Roman Catholic, but Thomas from political necessity became a member of the Church of Ireland, as Catholics were then barred by the Penal Laws from entering the legal profession. He entered the Middle Temple in 1747 and was called to the Bar in 1753; he is said then to have spent some years in the West Indies. On his return to Ireland he began his legal practice on the Connacht circuit, where he sat as an extra judge of assize; he became King's Counsel in 1767 and Prime Serjeant in 1782.

== Political and judicial career ==
He entered politics: he was a close friend and strong supporter of Henry Grattan and sat briefly as MP for Portarlington in 1783. His support for the cause of full independence for the Parliament of Ireland made him very popular. It seems to have been his popularity, rather than any great legal expertise, which enabled him to become one of the most successful barristers of his time, and this, in turn, led to his gaining a seat on the Bench in 1783, and on the Privy Council of Ireland.

=== Reputation ===
Kelly as a judge proved to be something of an embarrassment to the Government which had appointed him. His problem, according to his colleague on the Bench, the memoirist Sir Jonah Barrington, was that his great popularity as a barrister was entirely unrelated to his legal abilities, which were mediocre at best, and he was appointed to the Bench by a Government which had a quite unjustified belief in his legal learning. Barrington records a story of Kelly, who had decided a point of law wrongly twice, expressing the hope that he could get the law right the third time. Nonetheless he retained his great popularity, having the reputation of being a kindly and humane judge, with a sense of humour, and a notable reluctance, unusual at the time, to impose the death penalty. Henry Grattan called him the most honourable and humane judge he ever knew.

Barrington's low opinion of Kelly as a judge was fully shared by the English-born politician Edward Cooke, always a stern critic of the Irish judiciary: he wrote that "Kelly has been most unfortunate in his judgments: (there is) scarcely one upon a dubious point which has not been set aside".

== Death ==
He had a townhouse in Dublin and a country seat, Kellyville (formerly Derrinroe), near Ballintubbert, County Laois, which he purchased around 1777, and substantially rebuilt. He retired in 1801: by some accounts, he resigned in protest against the passing of the Act of Union 1800 which destroyed the independent Irish Parliament, to which Kelly was devoted. He died in Dublin in 1809.

== Family ==
He married Frances Hickie, daughter of James Jephson Hickie of Carrick-on-Suir and his second wife Anne Salisbury Jephson. They had three daughters, Annabella, who married Sir George Pigott, first of the Pigott baronets, Harriet, who married Sir Richard St George, 2nd Baronet, the second of the St George baronets of Athlone, and Charlotte, and one son, Thomas Kelly (1769–1855).
