= Edmund Byam Mathew-Lannowe =

British general

Brigadier-General Edmund Byam Mathew-Lannowe CMG DSO
- Born: 29 June 1875; Presidency of Bombay, Bombay, India
- Died: 15 January 1940 (aged 64); London, UK
- Relatives: Sir George Buckley-Mathew (Grandfather)
- Military career
- Allegiance: United Kingdom
- Branch: Army
- Service years: 1895–1931
- Rank: Brigadier-General
- Conflicts: Malakand Field Force; Tirah Campaign; First World War; Waziristan Campaign; Wana Expedition
- Awards: CMG; DSO

Brigadier-General Edmund Byam Mathew-Lannowe CMG DSO (29 June 1875 – 15 January 1940) was a British Army officer and tank pioneer.

== Early life ==
Edmund Byam Mathew-Lannowe was born on 29 June 1875 in the Presidency of Bombay in India to Major-General Brownlow Hugh Mathew-Lannowe, formerly of the Royal Engineers. His grandfather was Sir George Buckley-Mathew CB, who had served with Coldstream Guards and was at one point British Ambassador to Argentina.

== Military service ==
Edmund attended Oxford Military College and the Royal Military College, Sandhurst. From there he was gazetted as a second lieutenant in the Queen's Royal Regiment (West Surrey) on 28 September 1895, having passed his examination with "Honours".

=== India ===
Mathew-Lannowe was promoted to lieutenant on 18 May 1897, and travelled with the regiment to India where he fought on the North West Frontier in 1897–98 as part of the Malakand Field Force and the Tirah campaign. On 1 December 1902 he was promoted to captain and appointed adjutant to the 1st Battalion, stationed in Peshawar. He served as adjutant until November 1905.

In 1909 he graduated from the Staff College in Quetta and joined the 1st Secunderabad Brigade as brigade-major in October of that year. He moved to the 3rd Lahore Division as GSO2 in February 1912 and returned to his regiment in October 1913.

=== First World War ===
Edmund’s regiment was in the United Kingdom when Britain declared war in August 1914, and he went to France with the British Expeditionary Force. Now Major Mathew-Lannowe, he was injured in September 1914 at the Battle of the Aisne. He was not able to redeploy until July 1915, when he was appointed brigade-major of the 101st Brigade (New Army) following his recovery.

He returned to France in March 1916 with the 39th Division of the New Army as GSO2. In this capacity he was with the division during the Battle of the Somme, the Battle of Ancre, the Battle of Ancre Heights and the Battle of Thiepval.

==== Tanks ====
It was at this point that Edmund was appointed to the role of Superintendent of Training at the Bovington Tank Centre in the UK. There was an interlude in this when he served at the War Office as chief staff officer to the Director-General of the Tank Corps, Sir John Capper. He was sent back to Bovington in August 1918 at Commandant of the training centre till August 1919.

Further to his work with the Tank Corps, he served on the Ministry of Munitions, Small Arms Committee.

His work was recognised with the award of the Distinguished Service Order in 1917 and the Order of St. Michael and St. George in 1918.

=== Post War ===
He took command of the 2nd Battalion of The Queen’s Royal Regiment in 1920. Serving in India, he commanded the Waziristan Force during the Wana Expedition. He was mentioned in dispatches for his service. His service ended in October 1931 when he retired with the honorary rank of brigadier-general. He remained on the reserve list and liable to recall until 1935 when he reached the age limit.

He was a Reader in Military Studies at London University.

== Personal life ==
He married Mary Mackenzie (maiden name, Deane), widow of Archibald Thomas Mackenzie, in 1919 with whom he had one daughter. Mary and her first husband were divorced in 1918 with Mathew-Lannowe was named in the proceedings as having been in a relationship with Mary. While away in India Archibald heard rumours of infidelity on Mary's part he instructed solicitors, Lewis and Lewis, to examine the matter. They discovered that Mary and Edmund had stayed as husband and wife at the River Hotel, Richmond in Surrey.

Mary and Edmund were married at St. James's Church in Piccadilly.

Edmund was a member of the Old Contemptibles Association and commanded a column during their march from Finsbury Square to St. Paul's Cathedral in 1939.

Edmund died at his London nursing home of bronchial pneumonia at the age of 64.
