= Henry Handcock =

Irish politician

Member of Parliament for Athlone
- In office 14 April 1856 – 2 April 1857
- Preceded by: William Keogh
- Succeeded by: John Ennis

Personal details
- Born: 2 August 1834
- Died: 1 December 1858 (aged 24) India
- Cause of death: Animal attack
- Party: Conservative
- Parent(s): Richard Handcock, 3rd Baron Castlemaine; Margaret Harris

Henry Handcock (2 August 1834 – 1 December 1858) was an Irish Conservative politician.

The youngest son of Richard Hancock and Margaret née Harris, Handcock was at some point a captain in the 44th (East Essex) Regiment of Foot.

Handcock was elected as the Member of Parliament (MP) for Athlone at a by-election in 1856—caused by the appointment of the sitting MP, William Keogh, as a judge of the Court of Common Pleas—but lost the seat less than a year later at the 1857 general election, when he was beaten by the Independent Irish Party candidate, John Ennis.

Handcock died little under a year later while hunting tigers in India. A report on his death, published by The Morning Chronicle, described the incident, where "the enraged animal" caused such injuries that he died within an hour, as the "most melancholy circumstances".

Parliament of the United Kingdom
Preceded by William Keogh	Member of Parliament for Athlone; 1856–1857	Succeeded by John Ennis
