= Baron Castlemaine =

Title in the Peerage of Ireland

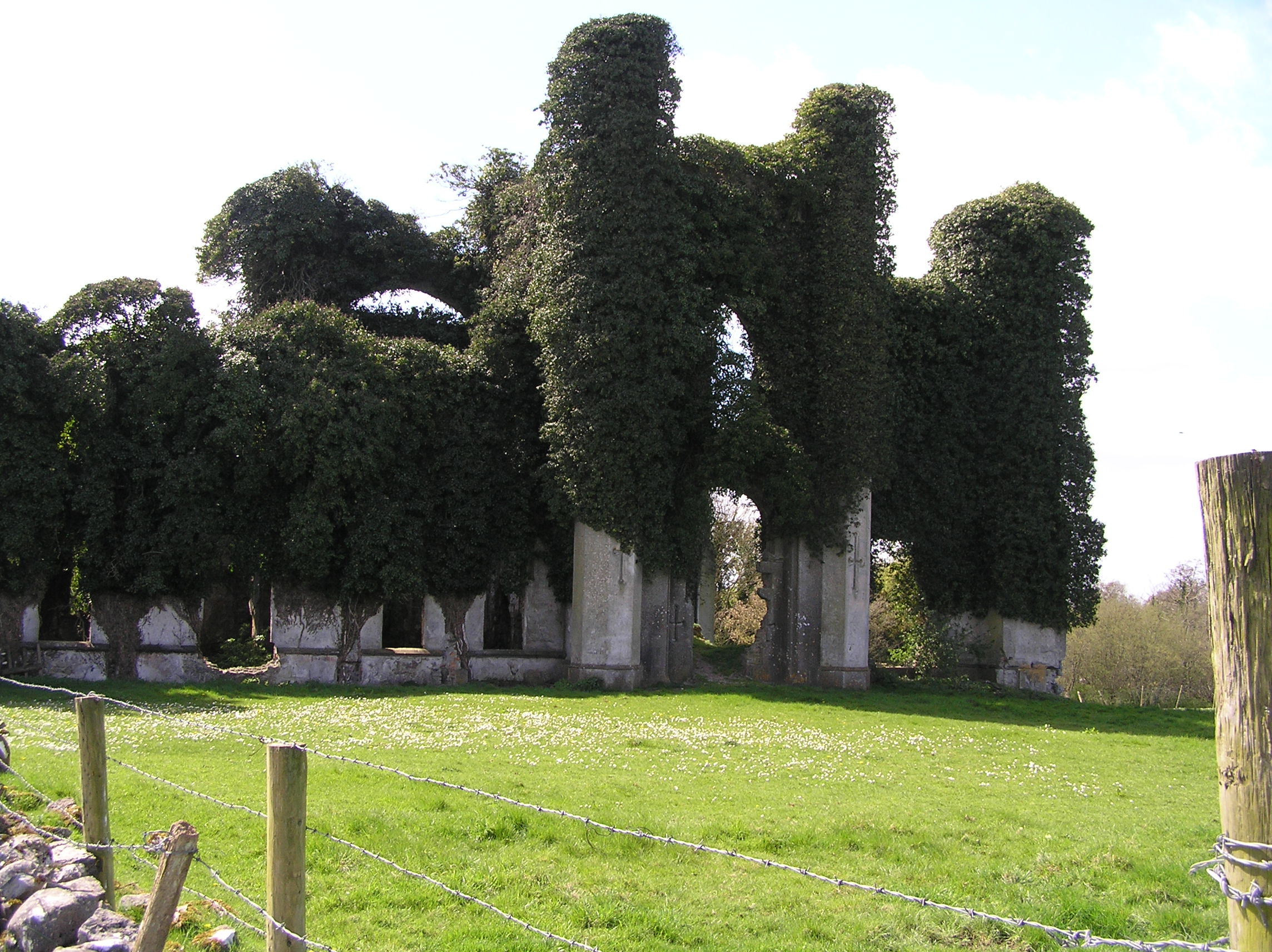
Moydrum Castle, the former seat of the Handcock family

Baron Castlemaine, of Moydrum in the County of Westmeath, is a title in the Peerage of Ireland. It was created in 1812 for William Handcock, with remainder to his younger brother Richard Handcock. Handcock represented Athlone in Parliament and also served as Governor of County Westmeath. In 1822 he was further honoured when he was made Viscount Castlemaine in the Peerage of Ireland, with remainder to the heirs male of his body.

On Lord Castlemaine's death, the viscountcy became extinct as he died childless, but he was succeeded in the barony according to the special remainder by his brother Richard, who became the second Baron. He also represented Athlone in Parliament. His son, the third Baron, was also Member of Parliament for Athlone and sat in the House of Lords as an Irish representative peer from 1841 to 1869. He was succeeded by his eldest son, the fourth Baron. He served as an Irish representative peer from 1874 to 1892 and was Lord Lieutenant of County Westmeath from 1888 to 1892.

On his death the title passed to his son, the fifth Baron. He was an Irish representative peer from 1898 to 1937 and served as Lord Lieutenant of County Westmeath from 1899 to 1922. On the death of his younger brother, the sixth Baron, the line of the eldest son of the third Baron failed. He was succeeded by his first cousin once removed, the seventh Baron. He was the grandson of the Hon. Robert John Handcock, second son of the third Baron. As of 2014 the title is held by his son, the eighth Baron, who succeeded in 1973.

The family seat was Moydrum Castle, near Athlone, County Westmeath.

== Baron Castlemaine (1812) ==
- William Handcock, 1st Baron Castlemaine (1761–1839) (created Viscount Castlemaine in 1822)

=== Viscount Castlemaine (1822) ===
- William Handcock, 1st Viscount Castlemaine (1761–1839)

=== Baron Castlemaine (1812; reverted) ===
- Richard Handcock, 2nd Baron Castlemaine (1767–1840)
- Richard Handcock, 3rd Baron Castlemaine (1791–1869)
- Richard Handcock, 4th Baron Castlemaine (1826–1892)
- Albert Edward Handcock, 5th Baron Castlemaine (1863–1937)
- Robert Arthur Handcock, 6th Baron Castlemaine (1864–1954)
- John Michael Schomberg Staveley Handcock, 7th Baron Castlemaine (1904–1973)
- Roland Thomas John Handcock, 8th Baron Castlemaine (born 1943)

The heir apparent is the present holder's only son, the Hon. Ronan Michael Handcock (born 1989).

Coat of arms of Baron Castlemaine
Crest A demi-lion rampant Azure holding between the paws a fusil Argent charged with a cock Gules. Escutcheon Ermine on a chief Sable a dexter hand between two cocks Argent armed crested and jelloped Gules. Supporters Dexter a lion guardant Azure sinister a cock Proper. Motto Vigilate Et Orat

== See also ==
- Moydrum Castle
- Moydrum (townland)
