= Ennis baronets =

Extinct baronetcy in the Baronetage of the United Kingdom

- Escutcheon of the Ennis baronets of Ballinahown Court
- Creation date: 1866
- Status: extinct
- Extinction date: 1884
- Motto: Virtute et valore, By virtue and valour

The Ennis Baronetcy, of Ballinahown Court in the County of Westmeath, was a title in the Baronetage of the United Kingdom. It was created on 27 July 1866 for John Ennis, Member of Parliament for Athlone from 1857 to 1865. The second Baronet was also Member of Parliament for Athlone. The title became extinct on his death in 1884.

== Ennis baronets, of Ballinahown Court (1866) ==
- Sir John Ennis, 1st Baronet (1800–1878)
- Sir John James Ennis, 2nd Baronet (1842–1884)
