= Peter Holmes (1675–1732) =

Peter Holmes (1675–1732) of Peterfield was an Irish High Sheriff and MP in the Irish House of Commons.

He was the son of George Holmes of New Hall, Co Kildare, Clerk of the Faculties jointly with his father.

Peter was High Sheriff of King's County for 1707 and elected Member of Parliament for Banagher in 1713. He was MP for Athlone from 1727 to 1731.

He married twice; firstly Lucy, the daughter of William Sprigg of Cloonivoe, King's County, with whom he had a son Robert, and secondly, Anne, widow of both Richard Malone and William L'Estrange.

Parliament of Ireland
Preceded by Thomas Lestrange; Charles Patrick Plunket	Member of Parliament for Banagher; 1713–1714; With: Charles Patrick Plunket	Succeeded by Thomas Lestrange; Charles Patrick Plunket
Preceded by George St George; Gustavus Handcock	Member of Parliament for Athlone; 1727–1732; With: George St George	Succeeded by George St George; Gustavus Handcock
