= Father Healy of Little Bray =

Irish Catholic priest (1824-1894)

Father James Healy
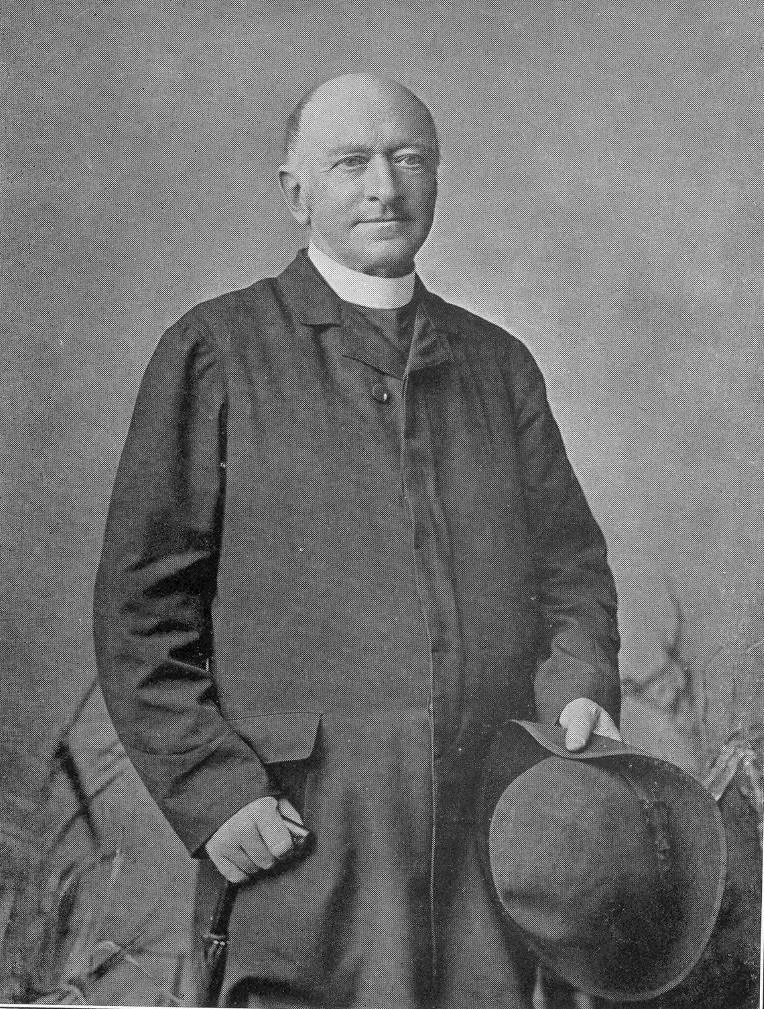
- Father James Healy of Little Bray
- Born: 15 December 1824; Dublin
- Died: 28 October 1894 (aged 69); Ballybrack

James Healy (1824–1894) was an Irish priest of the Roman Catholic Church who was famous in his day as a wit and conversationalist.

== Early life ==
James Healy was born in Francis Street, a rough area on the west side of Dublin, on 15 December 1824. His father, John Healy, was a provision merchant. His mother, Mary Meyler, was from Wexford.

In 1834 James Healy enrolled at the Vincentian seminary in Usher's Quay, as a day scholar. In 1839 he moved to St Vincent's College, Castleknock, which had opened in 1835. In 1843 he left the Vincentian order and entered the national seminary, St Patrick's College, Maynooth, from which he qualified as a priest. He left Maynooth in 1850.

== Clerical career ==
Father Healy's first appointment was as a reader at St Andrew's Church, Westland Row, Dublin; soon after that, in 1852, he took up the post of curate at the church of SS Michael and John. In 1858 he was appointed curate in the parish of Bray, County Wicklow. Nine years later, in 1867, he was put in charge of St Peter's chapel at Little Bray as administrator. Little Bray was then a hamlet of Dún Laoghaire, County Dublin; it is separated from Bray proper by the river Dargle. In 1868 Little Bray became a separate parish and Father Healy was made its parish priest. He remained in that role until 1893, when he was transferred to the parish of Ballybrack and Killiney, County Dublin.

Father Healy's ecclesiastical career was unremarkable, yet he became a figure of some repute in the cultured circles of his day. It was as a bon viveur and conversationalist that he gained his fame. His entertaining repartee made him a popular guest at dinner parties; he also held dinners at his own house which attracted visitors from all strata of society. As one of his regular guests observed, "His friends comprised all classes, rich and poor, old and young, Protestant and Catholic. He was a priest devoted to his Church and to his flock, but his heart was big enough to include kind and loving feelings for all."

A particular friend of Father Healy's was the controversial judge William Keogh QC, who lived near him in Bray. Another of his admirers, a Mr Darcy, took Father Healy on two extensive trips abroad, the first (in 1879) to Italy and Egypt, the second (in 1886) to the United States of America.

== Declining years ==
In the 1880s Father Healy began to suffer from liver problems and other health issues. After a break of several months "taking the waters" at Harrogate and Karlsbad (Baden) (during which period he claimed to have "shrunk to the size of a curate") he was well enough to resume his duties as a parish priest. In 1893 he was transferred to the parish of Ballybrack with Killiney, but by then his health was in terminal decline. He died, of liver failure aggravated by pneumonia, on 28 October 1894.

== Anecdotes ==
A lady told Father Healy she was one of the Dalys of Castle Daly, and asked what family he belonged to. "I belong to the Francis Street branch of the Halys of Castle Haly," he replied.

The Duchess of Marlborough once asked Father Healy if he could speak French. "I ought to, your Grace, for I was born in Francis Street," was his reply.

Sir Redvers Buller, a general who had fought in Africa, dined with Father Healy on one occasion when the other guests were Archbishop Walsh and eleven priests. Sir Redvers flinched when he saw he was the only layman. "Don’t worry," said Father Healy, "the soutane can’t be much worse than the Soudan!"

Father Healy was sceptical of physicians. When he was on his deathbed Dr Christopher Nixon came to attend to him. "My dear Father James," he said, "you are exceedingly ill. We know what is best for you, and I must ask you to submit your will to us." "I shan’t," retorted the Reverend Father, "you might alter it!"

== Meeting with Gladstone ==
Father Healy came to the attention of William Ewart Gladstone while the latter was visiting Dublin in 1877. On his way to Italy in 1879 Father Healy stopped in London and was invited to breakfast at Gladstone's house. The tale he subsequently told about this occasion was recorded by a young writer:

My father took me one evening to dine (at the house of Mr Justice James Murphy) near Stillorgan. I soon became aware that the wine was excellent, and was being drunk with attention. But before long I found my mind chiefly engaged in marvelling who on earth was this little priest with the humorous face, who kept saying precisely the right thing in precisely the happiest way. For I had never then heard of Father Healy of Bray. No reasonable person could fail to see that this man was an extraordinary artist in conversation. ... One story he told that night is so characteristic of the man that I give it as I wrote it from memory thirty years ago, after his death. Mr Gladstone’s name had come up, as in those days it could not fail to do; and Father Healy was expressing admiration for his wonderful accomplishments. “He asked me to breakfast in his own house one day,” he said, “and there were a lot of big men there; ministers and men of science, and writers and what not: but he seemed the master of every one of them on his own subject. Well, after breakfast, Gladstone began declaiming about the doctrine of indulgence; and, seeing where I was, I tried to make myself as little as I could. It was no use; he turned round on me there, with his eyes flashing: ‘Father Healy, I saw with my own eyes in a church at Verona a notice offering to remit forty thousand years in purgatory for the sum of two hundred lire. Now – what do you say to that?’ Well, I was in a fix with all those fellows looking at me; but I thought of a way; so I said, ‘It’s a fair offer, and I don’t know where you’d go to do better.’”

== Testimonials ==
“His outward presence expressed perfectly the soul within. It would have been a common face but for the uncommon qualities which marked it, for it was broadened with smiles, lit up with a twinkling eye, refined by the thin nostril and mobile lips, which told of his delicate perception and his ready utterance – an utterance rich with the flavour of his origin. He was never at a loss for a kindly word; to meet him in the street was like passing suddenly into sunshine.” –– Dr John Pentland Mahaffy, Fellow (later Provost) of Trinity College, Dublin

“Father James was one of the most charming of men – racy of the soil, a true Irishman, a true friend, kind, witty, genial, sociable. We shall not soon look upon his like again. I knew him for over a quarter of a century; I have dined with him on several occasions in his house at Little Bray, and I can never forget those wonderful and hospitable entertainments. The numbers varied – sometimes eight, ten, twelve, even fourteen. The most varied guests met at his table. I have sat there at the same time with Prince Edward of Saxe-Weimar, Lord Powerscourt, Monsignor Persico, Archbishop Walsh, Lord Morris, Chief Baron Palles, and others. His guests were always delighted to be there, and he was delighted to have them. One servant cooked the dinner and brought it to the table, and no one could tell how the attendance was arranged. Once, I remember, when some officer of the Guards was dining with the Padre, he looked round for a servant to take his coat and hat when he entered the house, and the host came forward smiling, saying: ‘You know those footmen of mine all gave me notice and left on the spot when they heard that you were coming.’ He was brilliant, quick like lightning in conversation, and never hesitated for a second to come out with a sparkling, genial mot.” –– Lord Ashbourne
