= St George baronets =

Two Irish hereditary titles

There have been two baronetcies created for persons with the surname St George, both in the Baronetage of Ireland. One creation is extant as of 2010.

The St George Baronetcy, of Carrickdrumrusk in the County of Leitrim, was created in the Baronetage of Ireland on 5 September 1660. For more information on this creation, see Baron St George.

The St George Baronetcy, of Athlone in the County of Westmeath, was created in the Baronetage of Ireland on 12 March 1766 for Richard St George, Member of the Irish Parliament for Athlone between 1763 and 1789. George Baker Bligh St George, a grandson of Robert St George, third son of the second Baronet, was married to the Republican politician Katharine St. George.

== St George baronets, of Carrickdrumrusk (1660) ==
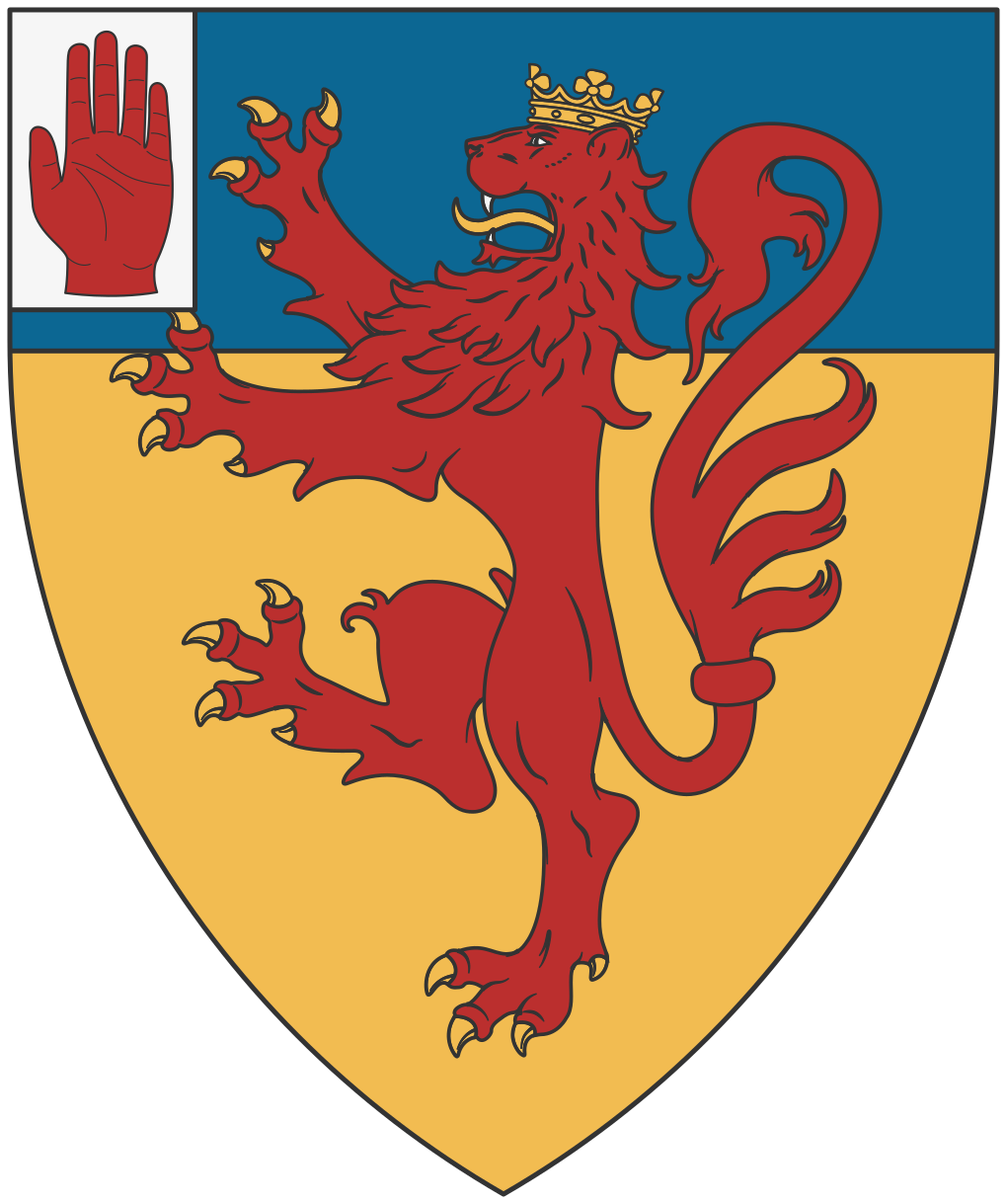
Arms of St George of Carrickdrumrusk

- see Baron St George

== St George baronets, of Athlone (1766) ==
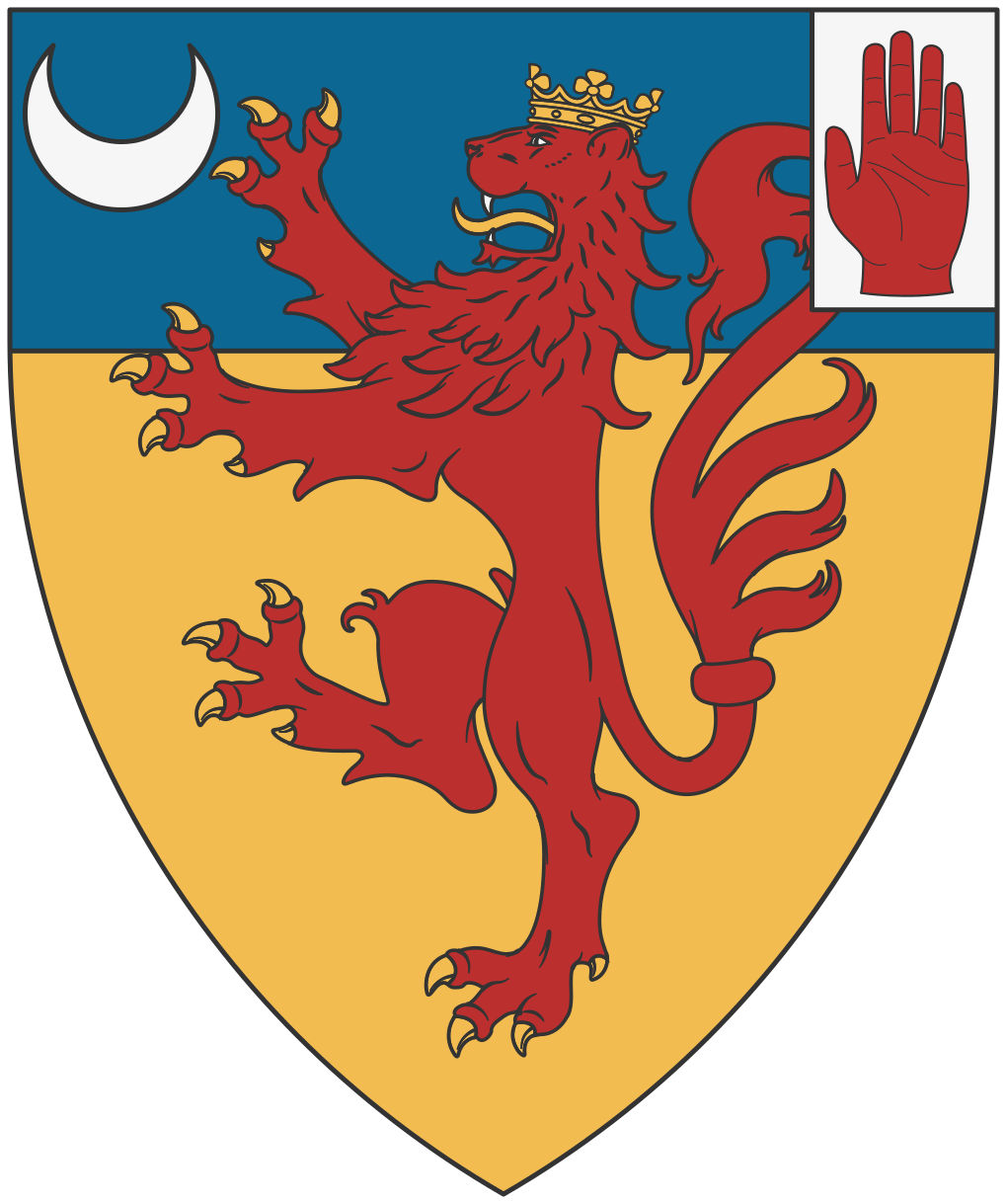
The coat of arms of the St George baronets of Athlone

- Sir Richard St George, 1st Baronet (died 1789)
- Sir Richard Bligh St George, 2nd Baronet (1765–1851)
- Sir Theophilus John St George, 3rd Baronet (1816–1857)
- Sir Richard de Latour St George, 4th Baronet (1837–1861)
- Sir John St George, 5th Baronet (1851–1938)
- Sir Theophilus John St George, 6th Baronet (1856–1943)
- Sir Robert Alan St George, 7th Baronet (1900–1983)
- Sir Denis Howard St George, 8th Baronet (1902–1989)
- Sir George Bligh St George, 9th Baronet (1908–1995)
- Sir John Avenel Bligh St George, 10th Baronet (born 1940)

The heir apparent is the present holder's eldest son Robert Alexander Bligh St. George (born 1983).
