= Richard Handcock (priest) =

Irish Catholic priest

Richard Handcock (24 July 1712 – 25 July 1791) was Dean of Achonry from 1752 until his death.

Handcock was born in County Westmeath and educated at Trinity College, Dublin. His son was the first Baron Castlemaine.
