= George St George (Athlone MP) =

Irish politician

George St George (2 July 1682 – 23 December 1762) was an Irish politician. He sat in the Irish House of Commons as a Member of Parliament (MP) for Athlone from 1723 to 1761.

He was the son of Henry St George of Wooodsgift, County Kilkenny, which had been granted to the St George family in 1666, and Ann Hatfield, daughter of Ridgely Hatfield, Alderman of Dublin.

He married Elizabeth Bligh, daughter of Thomas Bligh and Elizabeth Napier, and sister of John Bligh, 1st Earl of Darnley. They were the parents of Sir Richard St George, 1st Baronet.

Parliament of Ireland
Preceded by Henry St George I Gustavus Handcock	Member of Parliament for Athlone; 1723–1761; With: Gustavus Handcock to 1727; Peter Holmes 1727–1732; Gustavus Handcock 1732–1751; Robert Handcock 1751–1759; William Handcock from 1759	Succeeded by Henry St George II; William Handcock
