= Lord Lieutenant of Westmeath =

Ceremonial officer in Westmeath, Ireland

This is a list of people who have served as Lord Lieutenant of Westmeath.

There were lieutenants of counties in Ireland until the reign of James II, when they were renamed governors. The office of Lord Lieutenant was recreated on 23 August 1831.

== Governors ==
- George Forbes, 3rd Earl of Granard: 1740-1756
- George Rochfort, 2nd Earl of Belvedere: 1772–1815
- George Nugent, 7th Earl of Westmeath: –1814
- Gustavus Hume Rochfort: 1815–1824
- William Handcock, 1st Viscount Castlemaine: 1824–1831
- George Nugent, 1st Marquess of Westmeath: –1831

== Lord Lieutenants ==
- George Nugent, 1st Marquess of Westmeath: 7 October 1831 – April 1871
- Fulke Greville-Nugent, 1st Baron Greville: 3 April 1871 – 26 January 1883
- Sir Benjamin Chapman, 4th Baronet: 28 March 1883 – 3 November 1888
- Richard Handcock, 4th Baron Castlemaine: 14 January 1889 – 26 April 1892
- Francis Travers Dames-Longworth: 13 June 1892 – 3 December 1898
- Albert Handcock, 5th Baron Castlemaine: 26 May 1899 – 1922
