= Sir Richard St George, 1st Baronet =

Sir Richard St George, 1st Baronet (died 1789) was an Anglo-Irish politician. He was the son of George St George of Woodsgift, County Kilkenny and Elizabeth Bligh, daughter of Thomas Bligh, MP and Privy Councillor, of Rathmore, County Meath, and sister of John Bligh, 1st Earl of Darnley. His grandfather Henry St George had been granted the Wooodsgift estate in 1666.

St George sat in the Irish House of Commons as the Member of Parliament for Athlone between 1763 and his death in 1789. On 12 March 1766 he was created a baronet, of Athlone in the Baronetage of Ireland.

He married Sarah Persse, daughter of Robert Persse of Roxborough House, County Galway, (ancestor of Lady Gregory) and Elizabeth Parsons, and had three sons. He was succeeded in his title by his eldest son, also called Richard St George.

Parliament of Ireland
Preceded by William Handcock; Henry St George	Member of Parliament for Athlone; 1763–1689; With: William Handcock (1763–1783); William Handcock (1783–1789)	Succeeded by William Handcock; Sir Richard St George, Bt
Baronetage of Ireland
New creation	Baronet (of Athlone); 1776–1789	Succeeded by Richard St George
