= Daniel Farrell =

Irish politician

Member of Parliament for Athlone
- In office 13 June 1842 – 21 March 1843
- Preceded by: George Beresford
- Succeeded by: John Collett

Personal details
- Died: 1870
- Party: Whig

Daniel Henry Farrell (died 1870) was an Irish Whig politician.

He was elected Whig MP for Athlone at a by-election in 1842—caused by the previous poll being declared void—but was declared unduly elected just under a year later after an election petition.

Parliament of the United Kingdom
Preceded by George Beresford	Member of Parliament for Athlone; 1842–1843	Succeeded by John Collett
