= Sir John Ennis, 2nd Baronet =

Irish politician (1842–1884)

Sir John James Ennis, 2nd Baronet (6 April 1842 – 28 May 1884) was an Irish Liberal politician who sat in the House of Commons between 1868 and 1874.

Ennis was born at Ballinahown Court, Athlone, the only son of Sir John Ennis, 1st Baronet and his wife, Anna Maria Henry, daughter of David Henry of Dublin. He was educated at Christ Church, Oxford. He was a J.P. and deputy lieutenant and was High Sheriff of Westmeath in 1866.

At the 1868 general election Ennis was elected member of parliament for Athlone. In 1874, he and Edward Sheil received an equal number of votes but after scrutiny the decision was made in favour of Sheil by five votes. In 1880, Ennis regained the seat and held it until he died in 1884.

Ennis inherited the baronetcy in 1878. He died of apoplexy in Mayfair at the age of 42 and the baronetcy became extinct.

Parliament of the United Kingdom
Preceded by Denis Rearden	Member of Parliament for Athlone; 1868 – 1874	Succeeded by Edward Sheil
Preceded by Edward Sheil	Member of Parliament for Athlone; 1880 – 1884	Succeeded by Justin Huntly McCarthy
Baronetage of the United Kingdom
Preceded by John Ennis	Baronet (of Ballinahown Court); 1878–1884	Extinct
