= James Talbot, 4th Baron Talbot of Malahide =

Anglo-Irish Liberal politician, archaeologist

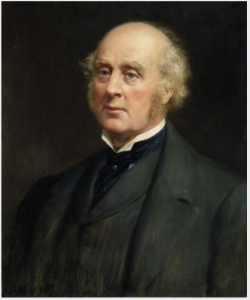

Member of the Parliament of the United Kingdom
- In office 1832–1834

Personal details
- Born: 22 November 1805
- Died: 14 April 1883
- Political party: Liberal

James Talbot, 4th Baron Talbot of Malahide FRS (22 November 1805 – 14 April 1883), was an Anglo-Irish Liberal politician and amateur archaeologist.

== Background ==
Talbot was the son of James Talbot, 3rd Baron Talbot of Malahide, and Anne Sarah Rodbard, daughter of Samuel Rodbard. He was educated at Trinity College, Cambridge.

== Political career ==
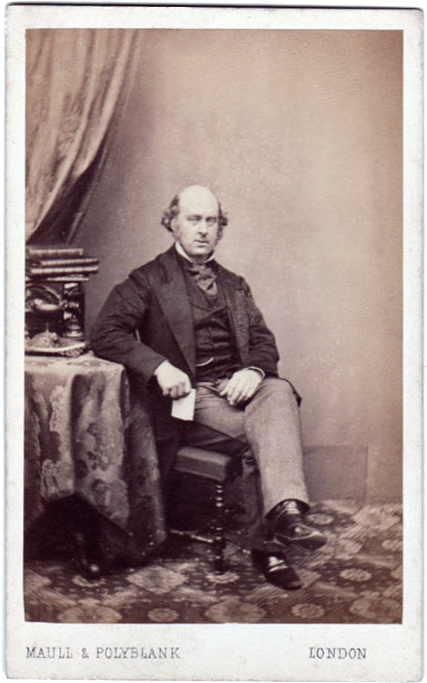
Lord Talbot of Malahide

In 1832 Talbot was elected to the House of Commons for Athlone, but did not contest the 1835 general election. He succeeded his father as fourth Baron Talbot of Malahide in 1850. This was an Irish peerage and did not entitle him to an automatic seat in the House of Lords. However, in 1856 he was created a peer of the United Kingdom as Baron Talbot de Malahide, in the County of Dublin. This gave him a seat in the House of Lords and from 1863 to 1866 he served as a Lord-in-waiting in the Liberal administrations of Lord Palmerston and Lord Russell. Lord Talbot de Malahide was present at a "General Meeting of the members and friends of the Irish Society for Women's Suffrage" in Blackrock, Dublin on 21 February 1872 and "expressed his sympathy with the movement for obtaining the Suffrage for women who were rate-payers."

== Archaeology ==
Lord Talbot de Malahide was also a noted amateur archaeologist and an active member of the Royal Archaeological Institute, serving as president for 30 years before announcing his intention to retire in 1882. He was also elected a Fellow of the Royal Society and of the Society of Antiquaries of London. He served as president of the London and Middlesex Archaeological Society from 1860 until his death, and as president of the Royal Irish Academy from 1866 to 1869.

== Family ==
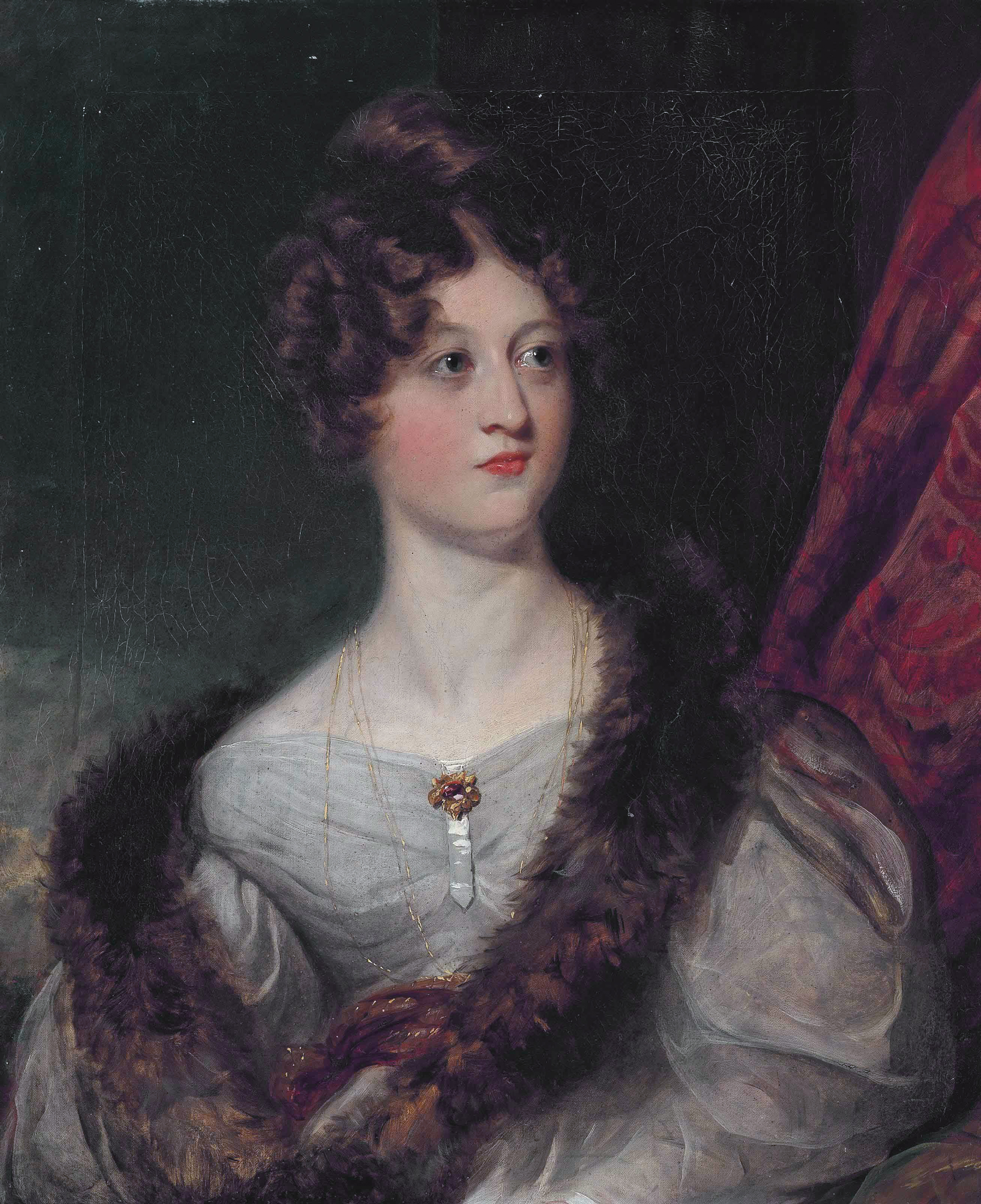
Maria Margaretta (née Murray), Lady Talbot de Malahide (follower of Thomas Lawrence)

Lord Talbot of Malahide married Maria Margaretta, daughter of Patrick Murray, in 1842. He died in Madeira in April 1883, aged 77, and was succeeded in his titles by his eldest son, Richard.

Parliament of the United Kingdom
Preceded by Richard Handcock	Member of Parliament for Athlone; 1832–1835	Succeeded by George Mathew
Political offices
Preceded by The Lord Harris	Lord-in-waiting; 1863–1866	Succeeded by The Lord Skelmersdale
Peerage of Ireland
Preceded by James Talbot	Baron Talbot of Malahide; 1850–1883	Succeeded by Richard Wogan Talbot
Peerage of the United Kingdom
New creation	Baron Talbot de Malahide; 1856–1883	Succeeded by Richard Wogan Talbot
