= James Murphy (Irish judge) =

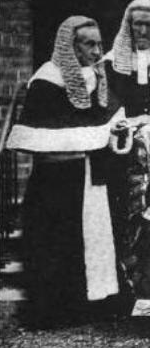
- In The Sketch, 4 November 1896
- Born: 1823; Kilfinane, Ireland
- Died: 5 September 1901 (aged 77–78); Dublin, Ireland
- Education: Trinity College Dublin
- Occupation(s): Barrister, judge
- Spouse: Mary Keogh (m. 1864)
- Children: 6, including Edward Sullivan Murphy

James Murphy (1823–1901) was an Irish barrister and judge of the late nineteenth century.

== Career ==
He was born at Kilfinane, County Limerick, the fifth son of Jeremiah Murphy. He matriculated at Trinity College Dublin in 1842 and took his bachelor's degree there in 1849. He entered Lincoln's Inn in 1847 and was called to the Bar in 1849. He became Queen's Counsel in 1866.

He was a superb advocate, noted for his "persistence, pathos and humour" in argument. He made his reputation as counsel for the prosecution in the Phoenix Park murders trials in 1883, and later that year was duly rewarded for the successful outcome of the trials (from the Crown's point of view) by appointment to the High Court. He sat first in the Common Pleas Division before being transferred to the King's Bench Division. He then transferred to the Exchequer Division, before finally returning to the King's Bench. He was appointed to the Privy Council of Ireland in 1890. As a judge he was noted for dignity and efficiency rather than for profound legal learning. His judgments were generally considered to be right, and were rarely overturned on appeal, but very few of them were deemed worth reporting for their legal principles.

It was in private life that Murphy shone most brightly: he was noted for his "warm-hearted hospitality", and his guests were charmed by his lively conversation and erudition. Glencairn House, his home at Leopardstown, County Dublin, was one of the centres of Dublin social life. Ownership of Glencairn passed after his death to the notorious Tammany Hall politician Richard Croker ("Boss" Croker), and it is now the official residence of the British Ambassador to Ireland.

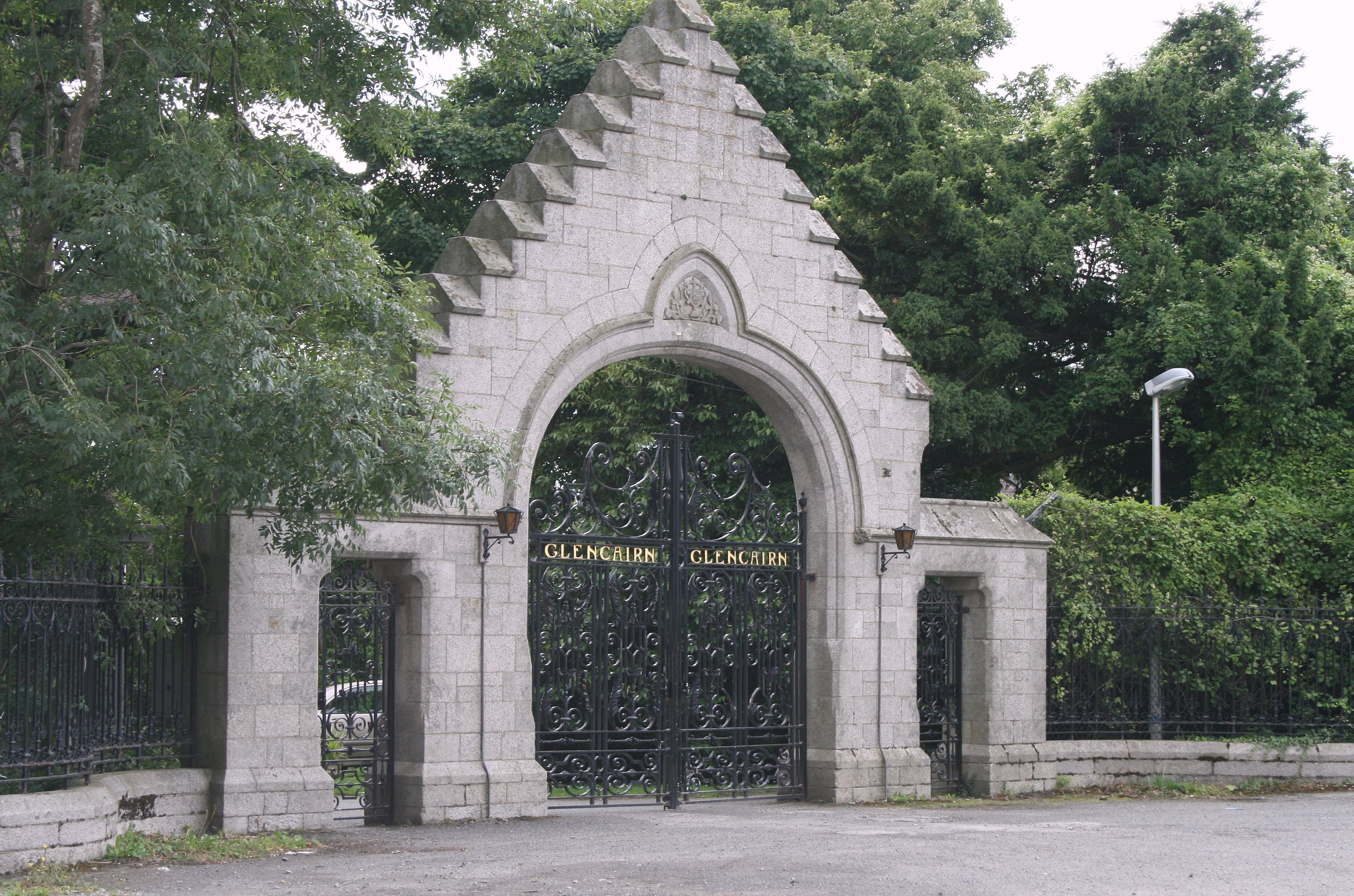
Glencairn House, Murphy's residence, now the official residence of the British Ambassador

== Family ==
He married Mary Keogh, daughter of Mr Justice William Keogh of the Court of Common Pleas and his wife Kate Rooney, in 1864. Keogh had been a much-hated politician (of "Sadleir and Keogh" infamy, a proverb for betrayal of one's political principles) before his appointment to the Bench, and was an equally unpopular judge, but his son-in-law was always his good friend and champion.

He and Mary had one daughter and five sons, including Harold Lawson Murphy, best remembered as the author of a well-known History of Trinity College Dublin (1951), and Edward Sullivan Murphy, Attorney General for Northern Ireland and later a Lord Justice of Appeal in Northern Ireland.

James Murphy died at Glencairn House in Dublin on 5 September 1901.

== Sources ==
- Ball, F. Elrington The Judges in Ireland 1221-1921 London John Murray 1926
- Delaney, V.T.H. Christopher Palles Dublin Alan Hanna 1960
- Thoms Irish Who's Who Dublin Alexander Thom and Co. 1923
