= Robert Handcock =

Irish politician

Robert Handcock (15 April 1728 – 24 November 1758) was an Irish politician.

He was the only son of Gustavus Handcock and his wife Elizabeth Temple, daughter of Robert Temple. Handcock entered the Irish House of Commons in 1751, sitting for Athlone, the same constituency his father had represented before, until his death in 1758.

On 4 July 1751, he married Elizabeth Vesey, oldest daughter of John Vesey, 1st Baron Knapton and sister of Thomas Vesey, 1st Viscount de Vesci, and had by her an only son.

He died in November 1758 at age 30.

Parliament of Ireland
Preceded by George St George; Gustavus Handcock	Member of Parliament for Athlone; 1751–1758; With: George St George	Succeeded by George St George; William Handcock
