= Albert Handcock, 5th Baron Castlemaine =

Irish peer and landowner

Albert Handcock
- 5th Baron Castlemaine
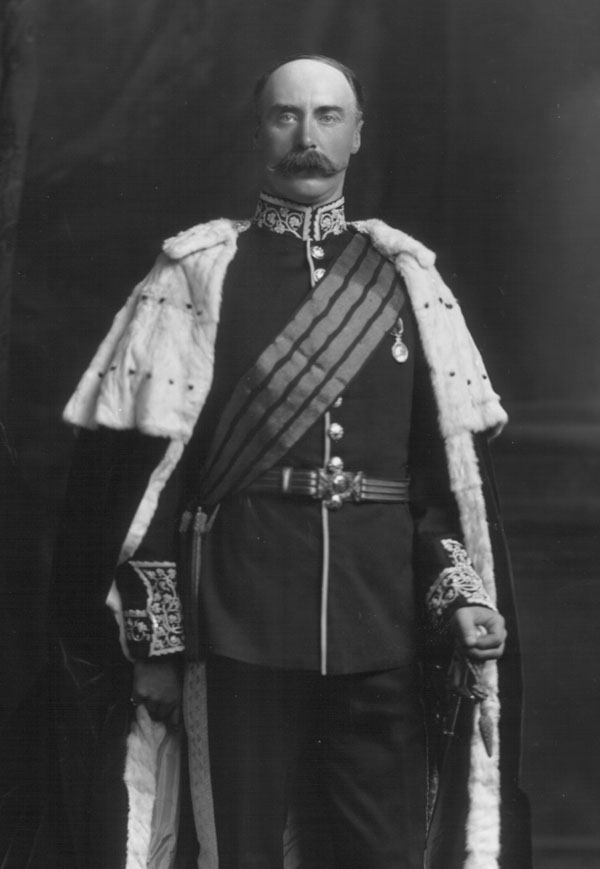
- Photograph, 26 November 1902
- Reign: 1892–1937
- Predecessor: Richard Handcock
- Successor: Robert Arthur Handcock
- Born: East Hill, Athlone; 26 March 1863
- Died: 6 July 1937 (aged 74); London
- Spouse: Annie Evelyn Barrington
- Issue: 1
- Father: Richard Handcock, 4th Baron Castlemaine
- Mother: Louisa Matilda Harris
- Occupation: Landowner

Albert Edward Handcock, 5th Baron Castlemaine (26 March 1863 – 6 July 1937), styled The Honourable from 1869 to 1892, was an Irish peer. He was a major landowner with 12,000 acres (49 km^{2}).

== Background ==
Born at East Hill, Athlone, he was the second son of Richard Handcock, 4th Baron Castlemaine and his wife Hon. Louisa Matilda Harris, only daughter of William Harris, 2nd Baron Harris.

In 1892, he succeeded his father as baron. Handcock was educated at Eton College and went then to Christ Church, Oxford, where he graduated with a Bachelor of Arts in 1895. He was a Knight of Grace of the Most Venerable Order of the Hospital of St John of Jerusalem.

== Career ==
Handcock served in the British Army as lieutenant of the 4th Royal Inniskilling Fusiliers. In 1898, he was elected an Irish representative peer to the House of Lords. Previously a Deputy Lieutenant of that county, he was appointed Lord Lieutenant of Westmeath in 1899, a post he held until its abolishment with the Irish Free State Constitution Act in 1922.

== Family ==
On 25 September 1895, he married Annie Evelyn Barrington, only daughter of Colonel Joseph Thomas Barrington, at St George's, Hanover Square, and had by her an only daughter. Handcock died, aged 74 at London and was succeeded in the barony by his younger brother Robert.

== Arms ==
Coat of arms of Albert Handcock, 5th Baron Castlemaine
Crest A demi-lion rampant Azure holding between the paws a fusil Argent charged with a cock Gules. Escutcheon Ermine on a chief Sable a dexter hand between two cocks Argent armed crested and jelloped Gules. Supporters Dexter a lion guardant Azure sinister a cock Proper. Motto Vigilate Et Orat

Political offices
Preceded by The Lord Clarina	Representative peer for Ireland; 1898–1937	Office lapsed
Honorary titles
Preceded by Francis Travers Dames-Longworth	Lord Lieutenant of Westmeath; 1899–1922	Office abolished
Peerage of Ireland
Preceded by Richard Handcock	Baron Castlemaine; 1892–1937	Succeeded by Robert Arthur Handcock
