= Denis Rearden =

Irish politician

Denis Rearden QC MP

Member of Parliament for Athlone
- In office 15 July 1865 – 20 November 1868
- Preceded by: John Ennis
- Succeeded by: John Ennis

Personal details
- Born: c. 1810
- Died: 22 May 1885 (aged 74–75) Hendon, Middlesex
- Party: Liberal

Denis Joseph Rearden (c. 1810 – 22 May 1885) was an Irish Liberal politician.

He was elected as the Member of Parliament (MP) for Athlone in 1865 but stood down at the next election in 1868.

Rearden was for some time a house agent and auctioneer in Piccadilly, London. He died at his home in Hendon, Middlesex in 1885, around 75 years old.

Parliament of the United Kingdom
Preceded by John Ennis	Member of Parliament for Athlone; 1865 – 1868	Succeeded by John Ennis
