= Edward Sheil =

Irish nationalist politician (1851–1915)

Edward Sheil (1851 – 3 July 1915) was an Irish nationalist politician. He was a Member of Parliament (MP) for Athlone from 1874 to 1880, for County Meath from 1882 to 1885, and for South Meath from 1885 to 1892, taking his seat in the House of Commons of the United Kingdom of Great Britain and Ireland.

Sheil was the eldest son of the soldier and diplomat General Sir Justin Sheil and nephew of Richard Lalor Sheil, a political ally of Daniel O’Connell. His mother was Mary Leonora Woulfe, daughter of the Rt Hon. Stephen Woulfe, an MP and afterwards Chief Baron of the Irish Exchequer and his wife Frances Hamill. Mary Leonora was a travel writer of some note. He was educated at The Oratory School, and Christ Church, Oxford.

At the 1874 general election, when the franchise was still very restricted, he stood as a Home Rule League candidate and unseated Athlone's sitting Liberal MP, Sir John James Ennis. The poll was initially tied, each candidate scoring 140 votes, but Sheil was declared elected and on petition, the result was amended to 153 votes for Shiel and 148 for Ennis. In 1880, Ennis won the seat back by a one-vote majority of 163 to 162. Sheil was returned unopposed for Meath County in a by-election in April 1882, and when the Meath constituency was divided under the Redistribution of Seats Act 1885, he was returned unopposed at the 1885 general election as Irish Parliamentary Party MP for the newly created South Meath, where he was re-elected unopposed in 1886.

Sheil acted as Whip of the Home Rule Party for four years.

In the Split in the Irish Parliamentary Party in December 1890 over the leadership of Charles Stewart Parnell, he supported Parnell. However, he retired from Parliament at the general election of July 1892, apparently feeling that he could no longer defend the Parnellite cause. He wrote to John Redmond on 8 February 1892: ‘I am not prepared to continue resistance to what I conceive to be Irish public opinion… , the sympathy of the great majority of electors in Ireland is with the section of the Irish Party led by Mr. McCarthy’ (i.e. the Anti-Parnellites).

In retirement, Sheil lived at Ramsgate, Kent, where he died on 3 July 1915 and was buried on 6 July.

== Sources ==
- Irish Times, 7 July 1915
- National Library of Ireland, Papers of John Redmond, Collection List No.118
- Michael Stenton and Stephen Lees, Who’s Who of British Members of Parliament, Vol.2 1886–1918, Sussex, Harvester Press, 1978

Parliament of the United Kingdom
Preceded by Sir John Ennis, Bt	Member of Parliament for Athlone; 1874 – 1880	Succeeded by Sir John Ennis, Bt
Preceded by Michael Davitt; Robert Metge	Member of Parliament for County Meath; 1882 – 1885; With: Robert Metge to 1884; William Meagher from 1884	Constituency divided
New constituency	Member of Parliament for South Meath; 1885 – 1892	Succeeded by Patrick Fulham
