= Gustavus Handcock =

Irish politician

Gustavus Handcock (13 August 1693 – 4 September 1751) was an Irish politician.

He was the son of Stephen Handcock, fourth son of William Handcock. Handcock entered the Irish House of Commons in 1723, holding his seat for Athlone until 1727. He represented the constituency again from 1732 until his death in 1751.

In July 1725, he married Elizabeth Temple, daughter of Robert Temple. Their only child Robert sat also in the Parliament of Ireland.

Parliament of Ireland
Preceded by William Jones; Henry St George	Member of Parliament for Athlone; 1723–1727; With: Henry St George 1723; George St George 1723–1727	Succeeded by George St George; Peter Holmes
Preceded by George St George; Peter Holmes	Member of Parliament for Athlone; 1732–1751; With: George St George	Succeeded by George St George; Robert Handcock
