= Henry Hoare (MCC cricketer, 1823) =

English cricketer

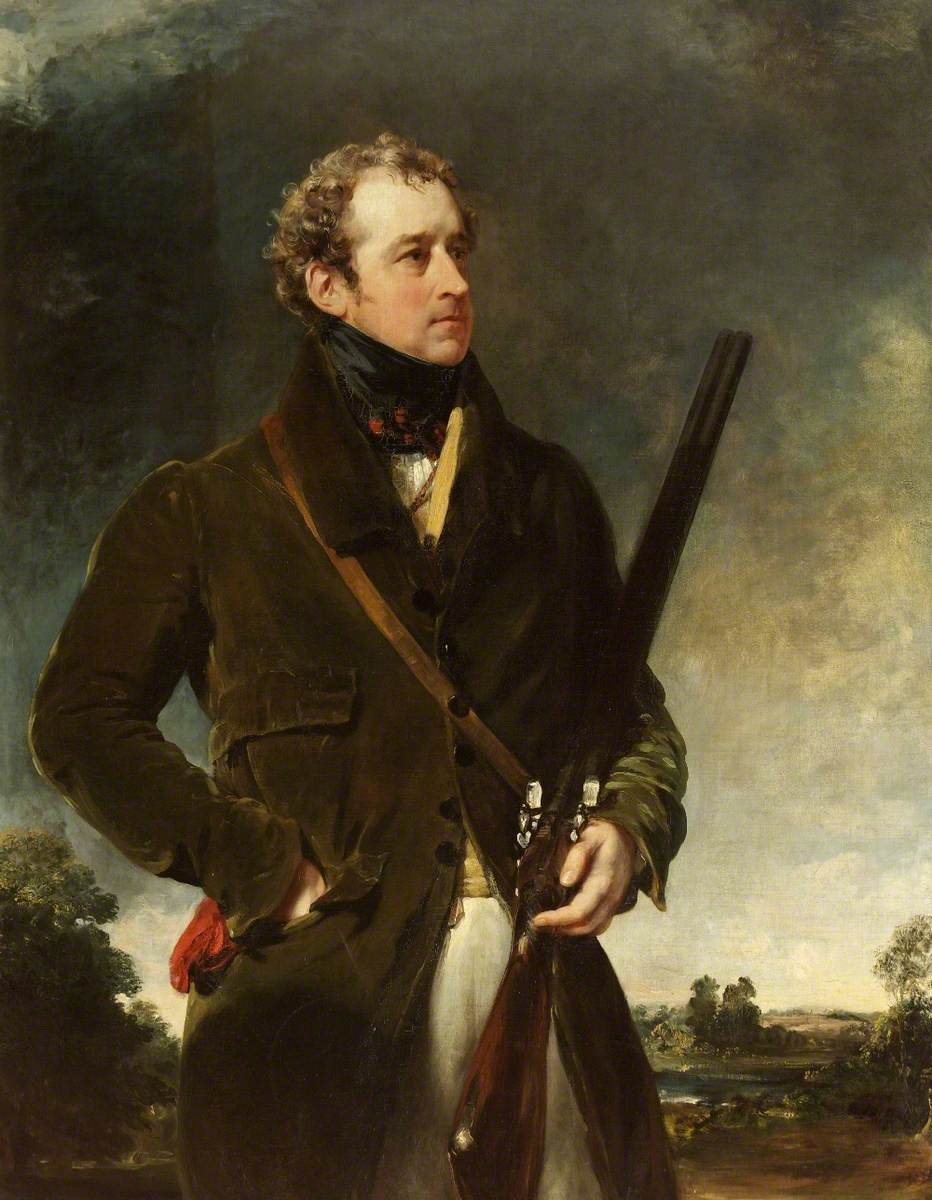
Portrait by Margaret Sarah Carpenter, 1829

Henry Richard Hoare (1784–1836) was an English amateur cricketer.

== Life ==
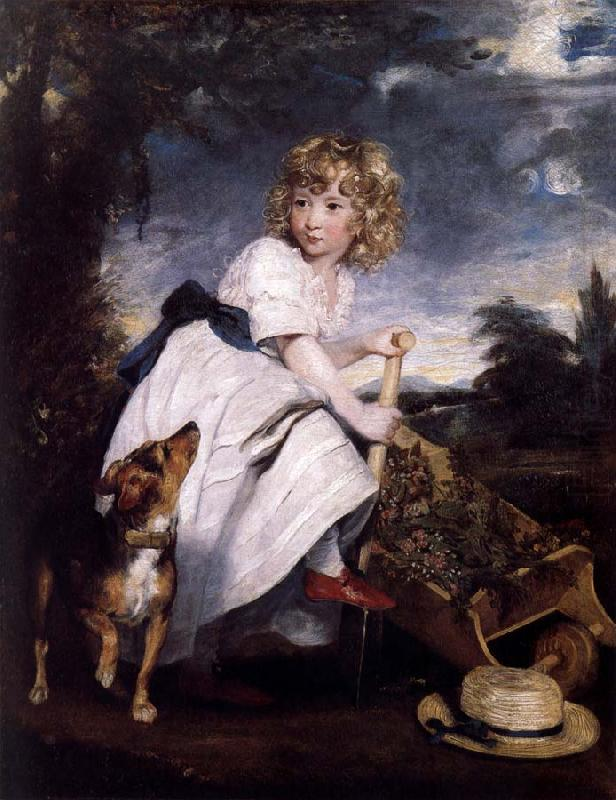
Henry Hoare as a boy, 1788 portrait by Sir Joshua Reynolds

He was the only son of Sir Richard Colt Hoare, 2nd Baronet and his wife Hester Lyttelton (1762–1785), daughter of William Henry Lyttelton, born 17 September 1784. He matriculated at Christ Church, Oxford in 1803.

An unambitious pleasure-seeker, Hoare married in 1808. In 1811 he suffered a breakdown, and his father took against his wife Charlotte, leading to a family rupture. He separated from Charlotte, and was heavily in debt.

Hoare was a member of Marylebone Cricket Club (MCC) and made known appearances in three high-level matches from 1823 to 1824. He died 18 September 1836 at Hastings, Sussex.

== Family ==
Hoare married on 20 February 1808 Charlotte Dering, daughter of Sir Edward Dering, 7th Baronet. They had a daughter Ann(e) (1808–1872), who married in 1835 Sir George Benvenuto Buckley Mathew.

== Bibliography ==
- Arthur Haygarth, Scores & Biographies, Volume 1 (1744–1826), Lillywhite, 1862
