= Arthur St George =

Irish politician

Arthur St George (1629 – August 1701) was an Irish politician.

He represented Athlone in the Irish House of Commons in the Parliaments of Ireland between 1692 and 1693 and then 1695 to 1699.
