= William Keogh =

Irish lawyer, politician and judge

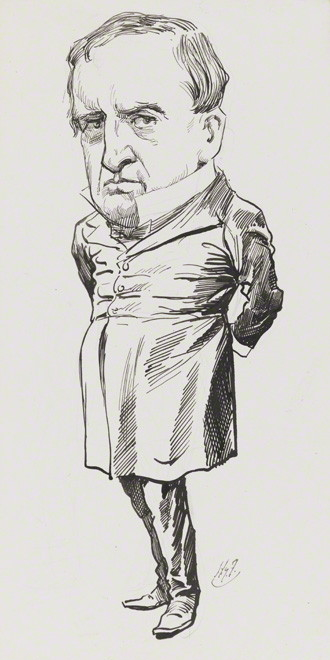
Caricature of William Keogh by Harry Furniss.

William Nicholas Keogh PC (1817– 30 September 1878) was an unpopular and controversial Irish politician and judge, whose name became a byword in Ireland for betraying one's political principles.

== Background ==
He was born in Galway, son of William Keogh, clerk of the Crown for Kilkenny, and his wife Mary ffrench, daughter of Austin ffrench of Rahoon, near Galway. He went to Dr Huddard's school in Dublin, and graduated from Trinity College Dublin: he was called to the Bar in 1840, and became Queen's Counsel in 1849. No one has ever questioned his intellectual abilities. He was a superb speaker both in public and private and he founded a well-known debating society, the Tail-end Club. He published several books on law, politics and literature, including a book on the prose writings of John Milton. Despite his later reputation for eccentricity and bad temper, as a young man, he was considered to be the best of company: genial, good-humoured and a superb conversationalist. He joined the Connaught circuit where he rapidly acquired a large practice, due less to any great legal skill than to his eloquence and impressive presence; these gifts soon turned him towards politics.

He married Kate Rooney, daughter of Thomas Rooney, a Galway surgeon, in 1841; they had one son, and a daughter Mary, who married James Murphy (1823–1901), judge of the High Court, and had six children, including Edward Sullivan Murphy.

== Political career ==
In 1847 Keogh was elected MP for Athlone. In 1851 he was one of the founders of the Catholic Defence Association which championed the cause of tenant reform; he was re-elected for Athlone in 1852. In the latter year he helped found the Independent Irish Party, which was popularly known as "the Pope's Brass Band". The new party was pledged to repeal the Ecclesiastical Titles Act and to further the cause of tenant reform, and most crucially, its members gave an explicit promise not to take office but instead to hold the balance of power at Westminster. In this they were at first successful, helping to vote out the administration of Lord Derby, who was replaced by Lord Aberdeen.

Within months of promising not to take office, Keogh (together with his colleague John Sadleir) made the decision which destroyed his reputation in his own lifetime and long after his death: he accepted office in the Aberdeen Government, becoming first Solicitor-General for Ireland, and then Attorney-General for Ireland in 1855. His decision was seen by the Irish electorate as an unforgivable betrayal of a solemn pledge and his name, along with Sadleir's, entered the Irish political vocabulary. Even a century later, John A. Costello turned down the offer by Éamon de Valera to make him a Supreme Court judge on the ground that he "did not wish face charges of being another Sadleir or Keogh".

In 1854, Keogh was appointed to the Royal Commission for Consolidating the Statute Law, a royal commission to consolidate existing statutes and enactments of English law.

== Judicial career ==
In 1856 Keogh was appointed a judge of the Irish Court of Common Pleas. On the grounds of legal ability no one could dispute that he was highly qualified for judicial office, and in non-political cases, he had a good reputation: if not a profound lawyer, he had the ability to quickly see the essential point of a case. Unfortunately his conduct as a judge did nothing to restore the damage to his reputation. He was a man of strong opinions, which were always expressed forcefully, and his hot temper led to frequent quarrels with counsel. On one occasion Peter O'Brien, the future Lord Chief Justice of Ireland, was threatened with removal from Court. It must be said in Keogh's defence that, having recovered his temper, he apologised to O'Brien in open court in the presence of the assembled Bar. This suggests that Keogh, who as a young man had been famed for geniality and good humour, was not acting out of malice, but rather suffering from stress and ill-health.

Keogh's conduct of the "Fenian Trials" of 1865–1866 and the savage sentences which were handed down were much criticised, although his defenders said that Charles Kickham at least had been treated as leniently as the evidence allowed. Further damage was done to his reputation by his decision on the Galway election petition case of 1872, where William Le Poer Trench, the unsuccessful candidate, petitioned to unseat the winner, John Philip Nolan, on the grounds of intimidation and undue pressure from the Catholic clergy. According to Delaney, Keogh's judgment took nine hours to read and "was delivered in an extremely biased manner and did nothing to enhance the reputation of the judiciary". Much of it seems to have been a diatribe against the Catholic hierarchy, which struck the audience as coming very strangely from a former member of the "Pope's Brass Band". There was a public uproar, and the Government had to move to defeat a motion in the House of Commons calling for Keogh's removal from the bench. On foot of the judgment the Government's Law Officers, much to their own embarrassment, felt obliged to prosecute Patrick Duggan, Bishop of Clonfert, and were clearly relieved when he was acquitted.

== Friendship with Father Healy ==
Keogh developed a close friendship with Father Healy of Little Bray and the two used to dine at each other's houses every week. Father Healy's broad-mindedness and sense of humour struck a chord with the unconventional judge. Father Healy remained supportive of Keogh throughout Keogh's disputes with the Church and periods of mental illness.

The following exchange was recorded by Father Healy's biographer:

"My dear Healy," said Keogh, with a very solemn face, "I'll do anything you wish - only name it. I'd turn Turk or Mohammedan if it serves you."

"Turn Catholic," replied Healy.

== Last years and death ==
In his last years, Keogh showed increasing signs of eccentricity, in the face of unrelenting public hostility from much of the Catholic population. His public clash with Peter O'Brien, which probably occurred in 1877, suggests that his bad temper was the result of stress rather than ill nature, and the reminisces of Oliver Burke demonstrate that he could still show considerable charm and good humour on occasion. In 1878 he travelled abroad to Belgium and Germany in an effort to regain his health, but on 19 August 1878, he attacked his valet with a straight razor in a fit of delirium, and was confined to a hospital. While he may have recovered his sanity, he continued to decline physically and died in Bingen am Rhein on 30 September 1878. He was buried in Bonn.

== Reputation ==
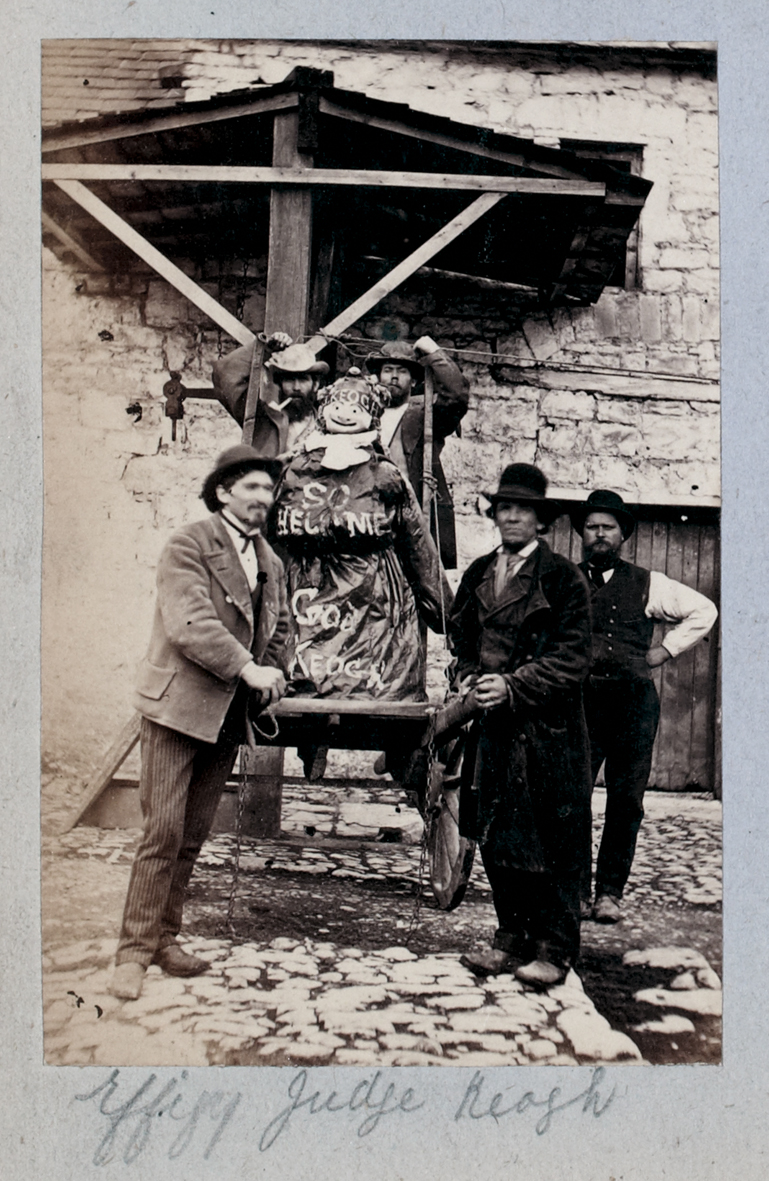
Effigy of Judge Keogh, published June 1872

Keogh's death did nothing to lessen the hostility to him at home; the Irish newspapers heaped abuse on him, causing The Times of London to protest that in any country but Ireland his talents would have won him popularity and respect. There is no doubt of his intellectual gifts, while his friends recalled the charm and good humour he had shown in his earlier years, and his son-in-law, Justice James Murphy, to whom he had been close, championed him to the end. The picture of him in Burke's Anecdotes of the Connaught Circuit, published a few years after Keogh's death, is largely favourable. However, as McCullagh points out, not many politicians so damage their reputations that they are still spoken of with contempt a century later; and despite Keogh's gifts, one must conclude that much of the damage to his reputation was self-inflicted.

The inscription on the Cormack brothers memorial at Loughmore – placed there 32 years after Keogh's death – was typical of the continuing hostility to him.

== Arms ==
Coat of arms of William Keogh

Crest
A boar passant Azure armed and crowned Or.
Escutcheon
Azure a lion rampant Gules in the dexter chief a dexter hand in the sinister chief an increscent of the last.

Parliament of the United Kingdom
Preceded by John Collett	Member of Parliament for Athlone; 1847–1856	Succeeded by Henry Handcock
Legal offices
Preceded by James Whiteside	Solicitor-General for Ireland; 1853–1855	Succeeded by John Fitzgerald
Preceded by Abraham Brewster	Attorney-General for Ireland; 1855–1856	Succeeded by John Fitzgerald
