= Sir Richard St George, 2nd Baronet =

Sir Richard Bligh St George, 2nd Baronet (1765 – 1851) was an Anglo-Irish politician.

== Biography ==
He was the eldest son of Sir Richard St George, 1st Baronet and Sarah Persse, daughter of Robert Persse of Roxborough House, County Galway, and in 1789 he inherited his father's baronetcy. Between 1789 and 1800 St George represented Athlone in the Irish House of Commons.

He married firstly Harriet Kelly, daughter of Mr Justice Thomas Kelly of the Court of Common Pleas (Ireland) and Frances Hickie. He married secondly Bridget Blakeney, daughter of Captain Theophilus Blakeney and Margaret Stafford. By two wives he had twelve children, including Theophilus, his eldest son and heir, and Grace, who married Charles Caulfield, briefly Bishop of Nassau and the Bahamas. He lived at Wooodsgift, County Kilkenny, which had been granted to his great-grandfather in 1666.

Parliament of Ireland
Preceded by William Handcock; Sir Richard St George, Bt	Member of Parliament for Athlone; 1789–1800; With: William Handcock	Succeeded by William Handcock; Richard Handcock
Baronetage of Ireland
Preceded by Richard St George	Baronet (of Athlone); 1776–1789	Succeeded by Theophilus St George
