= Sir John Ennis, 1st Baronet =

Irish politician

Sir John Ennis, 1st Baronet (1800 – 8 August 1878) was an Irish Independent Irish and Liberal politician who sat in the House of Commons from 1857 to 1865, and was Governor of the Bank of Ireland.

Ennis was born in Dublin, the only son of Andrew Ennis and Mary McManus, and baptised 31 August 1800 at the Catholic Church of Saints Michael and John. He was educated at Stonyhurst Roman Catholic College.

In 1857, Ennis was elected member of parliament for Athlone for the Irish Independent Party. In 1859, he was re-elected as a Liberal and held the seat until 1865. Ennis was created a baronet in 1866. He lived at Ballinahown Court, Athlone. In the 1870s, he owned estates of 8,774 acres (35.51 km^{2}) in Westmeath, 326 acres (1.32 km^{2}) in County Dublin and 262 acres (1.06 km^{2}) in Roscommon. He died at the age of 69

Ennis married Anna Maria Henry, daughter of David Henry of Dublin. His only son, John, was also MP for Athlone and succeeded to the baronetcy.

Parliament of the United Kingdom
Preceded by Henry Handcock	Member of Parliament for Athlone; 1857 – 1865	Succeeded by Denis Joseph Rearden
Baronetage of the United Kingdom
New creation	Baronet (of Ballinahown Court); 1866–1878	Succeeded by John Ennis
