= William Handcock (1737–1794) =

Irish politician

- In office 1759–1783 Serving with George St George; Henry St George; Richard St George
- Preceded by: Robert Handcock; George St George
- Succeeded by: William Handcock; Sir Richard St George, 1st Bt

William Handcock (1737 – April 1794) was an Irish politician.

He was the only son of Robert Handcock, fifth son of William Handcock, and his wife Jane Blackburne, daughter of Richard Blackburne. Handcock entered the Irish House of Commons in 1759, representing Athlone until 1783.

On 9 October 1767, he married Susannah, second daughter of Owen Lloyd and had by her an only son.

Parliament of Ireland
Preceded by Robert Handcock; George St George	Member of Parliament for Athlone; 1759–1783; With: George St George 1759–1761; Henry St George 1761–1763; Richard St George 1763–1783	Succeeded by William Handcock; Sir Richard St George, 1st Bt
