= Richard Handcock, 2nd Baron Castlemaine =

Irish peer and politician (1767–1840)

Richard Handcock, 2nd Baron Castlemaine (14 May 1767 – 18 April 1840), known as Richard Handcock until 1839, was an Irish peer and politician.

== Background and education ==
Castlemaine was a younger son of the Very Reverend Richard Handcock, Dean of Archonry, and Sarah, daughter of Richard Toler. William Handcock, 1st Viscount Castlemaine, was his elder brother. He was educated at Trinity College, Dublin.

== Political career ==
Castlemaine was a Member of the Irish House of Commons for Athlone from May 1800 until the Act of Union in 1801, alongside his elder brother, William. In 1839 he succeeded his elder brother as second Baron Castlemaine according to a special remainder in the letters patent. However, as this was an Irish peerage it did not entitle him to a seat in the House of Lords.

== Family ==
Lord Castlemaine married Anne, daughter of Arthur French, in 1790. They had seven sons and two daughters. He died after a long illness in April 1840, aged 72, and was succeeded in the barony by his eldest son, Richard. Lady Castlemaine died in November 1852.

His daughter Anne married Sempronius Stretton. His daughter Sarah married Major General Christopher Hamilton CB.

== Arms ==
Coat of arms of Richard Handcock, 2nd Baron Castlemaine
Crest A demi-lion rampant Azure holding between the paws a fusil Argent charged with a cock Gules. Escutcheon Ermine on a chief Sable a dexter hand between two cocks Argent armed crested and jelloped Gules. Supporters Dexter a lion guardant Azure sinister a cock Proper. Motto Vigilate Et Orat

Parliament of Ireland
Preceded by William Handcock; Sir Richard St George, 2nd Bt	Member of Parliament for Athlone; 1800–1801; With: William Handcock	Succeeded by Parliament of the United Kingdom
Peerage of Ireland
Preceded by William Handcock	Baron Castlemaine; 1839–1840	Succeeded by Richard Handcock
