= Athlone (Parliament of Ireland constituency) =

Pre-1801 Irish constituency

- Former borough constituency for the Irish House of Commons
- County: County Westmeath
- Borough: Athlone

1607–1801
- Replaced by: Athlone

Athlone was a constituency represented in the Irish House of Commons until 1801. Between 1725 and 1793 Catholics and those married to Catholics could not vote. Following the Acts of Union 1800 the borough became the Westminster constituency of Athlone.

== History ==
In the Patriot Parliament of 1689 summoned by James II, Athlone was represented by two members.

== Members of Parliament, 1607–1801 ==
- 1613–1615: Walter Nugent of Portloman and Richard St John (or St George)
- 1634–1635: Edward, Lord Brabazon and John Comyn
- 1639–1649: Oliver Jones and William Summers
- 1661–1666: Ridgeley Hatfield and Arthur St George

=== 1689–1801 ===
Election	First MP	Second MP	
1689	Edmund Malone	Edmond Malone	x
1692	William Handcock	Arthur St George	
1703	William Jones	William Handcock	
1715	William Jones	Henry St George I	
1723	Gustavus Handcock	Henry St George I	
1723	Gustavus Handcock	George St George	
1727	Peter Holmes	George St George	
1732	Gustavus Handcock	George St George	
1751	Robert Handcock	George St George	
1759	William Handcock I	George St George	
1761	William Handcock I	Henry St George II	
1763	William Handcock I	Richard St George (Note: Created a baronet in 1766)	
1783	William Handcock II	Richard St George	
1789	William Handcock II	Sir Richard St George, 2nd Bt	
1800	William Handcock II	Richard Handcock	
1801	Succeeded by the Westminster constituency Athlone		

== Bibliography ==
- O'Hart, John (2007). The Irish and Anglo-Irish Landed Gentry: When Cromwell came to Ireland. Vol. II. Heritage Books. ISBN 0-7884-1927-7.
- Johnston-Liik, E. M. (2002). History of the Irish Parliament, 1692–1800, Publisher: Ulster Historical Foundation (28 Feb 2002), ISBN 978-1-903688-09-0
- T. W. Moody, F. X. Martin, F. J. Byrne, A New History of Ireland 1534–1691, Oxford University Press, 1978
- Leigh Rayment's historical List of Members of the Irish House of Commons. Cites: Johnston-Liik, Edith Mary (2002). The History of the Irish Parliament 1692-1800 (6 volumes). Ulster Historical Foundation.
