= George Buckley-Mathew =

British politician and diplomat

Sir George Buckley-Mathew CB KCMG

Royal Governor of the Bahama Islands
- In office 20 June 1844 – 3 March 1849
- Preceded by: Sir Francis Cockburn
- Succeeded by: John Gregory

Member of Parliament for Shaftesbury
- In office 3 April 1838 – 29 June 1841
- Preceded by: John Sayer Poulter
- Succeeded by: Lord Howard

Member of Parliament for Athlone
- In office 6 January 1835 – 24 July 1837
- Preceded by: James Talbot
- Succeeded by: John O'Connell

Personal details
- Born: George Byam Mathew; 4 August 1807 Datchet, Berkshire, England
- Died: 22 October 1879 (aged 72) Strand, London, England
- Party: Conservative

Military service
- Branch: British Army
- Service years: 1825–1841
- Unit: 16th Regiment of Foot

Sir George Benvenuto Buckley-Mathew CB KCMG (born George Byam Mathew; 4 August 1807 – 22 October 1879) was a British diplomat and Conservative politician.

== Life ==
Born in 1807 as George Byam Mathew, Buckley-Mathew was the son of George Mathew of the Coldstream Guards and Euphemia née Hamilton. In 1835, he substituted the middle name 'Byam' for 'Benvenuto'.

Buckley-Mathew entered the army in 1825, joining the light infantry before, by 1833, becoming a captain in his father's regiment; although he retired altogether in 1841 when he was a captain in the Grenadier Guards.

His first marriage enabled Buckley-Mathew to enter politics, becoming a Conservative Member of Parliament for the Irish constituency of Athlone at the 1835 general election. At the following election, he instead stood for Shaftesbury but, on the initial count, was unsuccessful, losing to the Whig John Sayer Poulter. However, upon petition, Poulter's election was declared void and Buckley-Mathew was declared elected. He held the seat until just 1841, however, when he was again defeated and retired from politics altogether.

Frustrated at this political career, Buckley-Mathew was appointed Governor of the Bahamas in 1844, holding the role until 1849. His career in the Americas lasted some length; he was consul at Charleston, South Carolina, between 1850 and 1853, and then at Philadelphia, Pennsylvania in 1853, only ending in 1856 when his exequatur was removed by then-President of the United States Franklin Pierce. He then served in the Black Sea between 1856 and 1858, and became secretary and chargé d'affaires of the legation in Mexico and then for other Central American republics, the latter where he was minister from 1861 to 1863. He was minister to Colombia from 1865 to 1866, Argentina from 1866 to 1867, and Brazil from 1867 to April 1879.

He was made a Companion of the Order of the Bath (CB) in 1863 and a Knight Commander of the Order of St Michael and St George (KCMG) in May 1879, living in Leamington Spa in the late stages of his life, before dying in London on 22 October 1879.

== Family ==
In 1835, Mathew married Anne Hoare, daughter of Henry Hoare and Charlotte née Dering. In 1849, however, the marriage ended in what Buckley-Mathew called a "Scotch divorce". The following year, he remarried to Rosina Adelaide Handley, daughter of J. C. Handley—and, later, he again married to a daughter of J. W. Gerard of New York. Across his various marriages, he had at least five sons and two daughters.

Inheriting West Indian estates in 1837, Mathew took an additional surname Buckley, if after a delay, in 1865. The estates, from Abednego Mathew (died 1837), cousin to his father, were on St Kitts, and at Lyth near Ellesmere, Shropshire. Abednego Mathew's will required that George Matthew adopt the name Buckley, his mother's maiden name.

== Legacy ==
Matthew Town, the only settlement on Great Inagua Island of the Bahamas, is named after him.

Government offices
Preceded by Francis Cockburn	Governor of the Bahamas; 1844–1849	Succeeded by John Gregory
Parliament of the United Kingdom
Preceded by James Talbot	Member of Parliament for Athlone; 1835–1837	Succeeded by John O'Connell
Preceded by John Sayer Poulter	Member of Parliament for Shaftesbury; 1838–1841	Succeeded by Henry Howard
