= Richard Handcock, 4th Baron Castlemaine =

Irish peer

Richard Handcock, 4th Baron Castlemaine (25 July 1826 – 26 April 1892), styled The Honourable from 1840 to 1869, was an Irish peer.

Born at Athlone, he was the oldest son of Richard Handcock, 3rd Baron Castlemaine and his wife Margaret Harris, daughter of Michael Harris. In 1869, he succeeded his father as baron. Handcock entered the British Army as ensign in 1844, was promoted to lieutenant two years later and served eventually as captain of the 41st (Welsh) Regiment of Foot from 1852. In 1874, he was elected an Irish representative peer to the House of Lords. A former Deputy Lieutenant of that county, he was appointed Lord Lieutenant of Westmeath in 1889, a post he held until his death in 1892.

On 10 February 1857, he married Hon. Louisa Matilda Harris, only daughter of William Harris, 2nd Baron Harris at Holy Trinity Brompton Church. They had five daughters and three sons. Handcock died from heart disease at Moydrum Castle and was succeeded in the barony successively by his second son Albert and his third son Robert.

== Arms ==
Coat of arms of Richard Handcock, 4th Baron Castlemaine
Crest A demi-lion rampant Azure holding between the paws a fusil Argent charged with a cock Gules. Escutcheon Ermine on a chief Sable a dexter hand between two cocks Argent armed crested and jelloped Gules. Supporters Dexter a lion guardant Azure sinister a cock Proper. Motto Vigilate Et Orat

Political offices
Preceded by The Lord Blayney	Representative peer for Ireland; 1874–1892	Succeeded by The Lord Muskerry
Honorary titles
Preceded by Sir Benjamin Chapman, 4th Bt	Lord Lieutenant of Westmeath; 1889–1892	Succeeded by Francis Travers Dames-Longworth
Peerage of Ireland
Preceded by Richard Handcock	Baron Castlemaine; 1869–1892	Succeeded by Albert Handcock
