= John Collett (MP) =

Irish Whig politician

Member of Parliament for Athlone
- In office 4 April 1843 – 5 August 1847
- Preceded by: Daniel Farrell
- Succeeded by: William Keogh

Personal details
- Born: 1798
- Died: 28 November 1856 (aged 57–58)
- Party: Whig

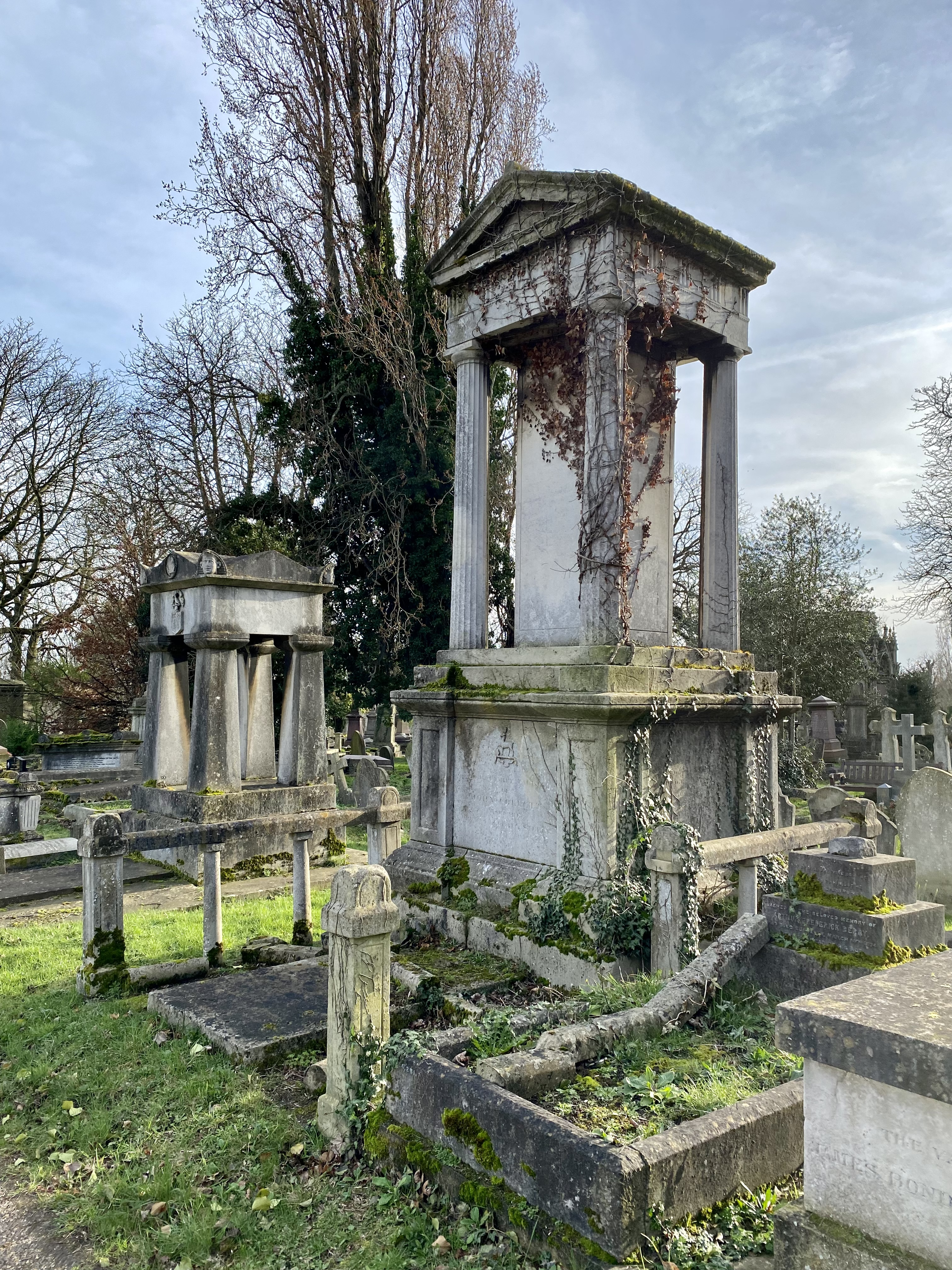
Collet and his wife Emma's tomb in Kensal Green Cemetery, London

John Collett (1798 – 28 November 1856) was an Irish Whig politician.

He was elected Whig MP for Athlone at a by-election in 1843—caused by the previous poll being declared void—and held the seat until 1847 when he did not seek re-election.

His father, Ebenezer John Collett, was also Tory MP for Grampound from 1814 to 1818, and then Cashel from 1819 to 1830. He was also brother of William Rickford Collett, MP for Lincoln from 1841 to 1847.

Collett was a member of the Reform Club, Union Club, Portland Club and Graham's Club. He committed suicide by shooting himself in the library of his home, Arnewood House, near Salisbury in December 1856. He was buried with his first wife Emma in a tomb in Kensal Green Cemetery. It was listed Grade II on the National Heritage List for England in 2001.

Parliament of the United Kingdom
Preceded by Daniel Farrell	Member of Parliament for Athlone; 1843–1847	Succeeded by William Keogh
