= Athlone (UK Parliament constituency) =

UK parliamentary constituency in Ireland, 1801–1885

- Former borough constituency for the House of Commons
- County: County Roscommon and County Westmeath
- Borough: Athlone

1801–1885
- Seats: 1
- Created from: Athlone (IHC)
- Replaced by: South Roscommon; South Westmeath

Athlone was a borough constituency representing the parliamentary borough of Athlone on the border of County Roscommon and County Westmeath, Ireland from 1801 to 1885. It elected one Member of Parliament (MP) to the House of Commons of the United Kingdom of Great Britain and Ireland.

== History ==
Prior to 1801, the town of Athlone was a two-seat borough constituency in the Irish House of Commons. Under the Acts of Union 1800, which united the Kingdom of Ireland with the Kingdom of Great Britain to form the United Kingdom, it was one of 33 boroughs to retain representation, but was reduced to one MP. Its first MP in 1801 was chosen by lot.

The right of election was vested in the burgesses and freemen. They numbered 71 in April 1831. By the Representation of the People (Ireland) Act 1832, the non-resident freemen (except those living within seven miles) were disfranchised and the right to vote was extended to the £10 householders. The registered electorate, in 1832, numbered 243.

Athlone ceased to have parliamentary representation under the Redistribution of Seats Act 1885, which took effect at the 1885 general election. The town was then represented in the county constituencies of South Roscommon and South Westmeath.

== Boundaries ==
Before 1832 the limit of the borough, under its charter, was a circle of a mile and a half radius from the centre of the bridge over the River Shannon, which waterway divided the town in two. However, for electoral purposes, those boundaries were diminished in 1832 and thereafter included only the town and a very small surrounding district, comprising 485 statute acres. A report into the boundaries of the borough of Athlone was undertaken in January 1832. The report found that limits of the borough were not defined, but as the limits were not connected with the elective franchise, it drew a line as closely as possible around the town. This comprised an area of 439 acres (1.78 km^{2}).

Under the Parliamentary Boundaries (Ireland) Act 1832, it was defined as:

From the Point at which the Southern End of the Canal joins the River Shannon, along the Canal, to the Point at which the Northern End thereof joins the River Shannon; thence along the River Shannon to the Point at which the same is met by the North-western Inclosure Wall of the Barracks; thence in a straight Line to the Angle in the Hare Island Road at which the same turns Northward, and at which there are Two Gateways with Pillars opposite each other; thence in a straight Line to a Gateway with Pillars on the Ballymahon Road, about Twenty Yards to the East of the Glebe Wall; thence in a straight Line to the North-eastern Corner of the Wall of the Townland called Anchor's Bower; thence, Southward, along the Wall of Anchor's Bower to the Point at which the same meets the old Dublin Road; thence in a straight Line in the Direction of Mr. Dawson's House in Bunavally to the Point at which such straight Line cuts a small Bye Road which runs into the Dublin Road; thence along the said small Bye Road to the Point at which the same joins the Dublin Road; thence in a straight Line to the Point at which the Brideswell Bog Road is joined by a Bye Road leading thereto from the East, about Three hundred Yards from the Point at which the Brideswell Bog Road leaves the Dublin Read; thence in a straight Line in the Direction of the Chimney of Mr. Robinson’s Distillery to the Point at which such straight Line cuts the River Shannon; thence along the River Shannon to the Point first described.

== Members of Parliament ==
Election	Member	Party	Note
1801 (co-option)	William Handcock		
1802	William Handcock		
1803 (b)	Thomas Tyrwhitt Jones		Resignation of Handcock
1806	George Tierney	Whig	
1807	Henry Wellesley	Tory	
1807 (b)	John Frewen-Turner		Wellesley sits for Eye
1812	John Wilson Croker	Tory	
1818	John Gordon		
1820	John McClintock	Tory	
1820 (b)	David Ker	Tory	
1826	Richard Handcock	Tory	
1830	Richard Handcock	Tory	
1831	Richard Handcock	Tory	
1832	James Talbot	Whig	
1835	George Mathew	Conservative	
1837	John O'Connell	Repeal (Liberal) (Note: O'Connell was the candidate of a Liberal/Repealer pact.)	
1841	George Beresford	Conservative	
1842 petition	Daniel Farrell	Whig	Beresford unseated on petition
1843 (b)	John Collett	Whig	Farrell unseated on petition and new writ issued
1847	William Keogh (Note: Keogh belonged to a number of parties during his tenure. He was elected in 1847 as a Peelite and he was re-elected in 1852 as a Liberal pledged to form an independent opposition in Parliament. Shortly after the election he briefly joined the Independent Irish Party, but upon being appointed Solicitor-General for Ireland he was re-elected as a Liberal candidate in 1853. Until he was appointed a judge in 1856, Keogh remained a Liberal.)	Peelite	
1852	William Keogh	Independent Liberal	
1853 (b)	William Keogh	Whig	Keogh appointed Solicitor-General for Ireland
1855 (b)	William Keogh	Whig	Keogh appointed Attorney-General for Ireland
1856 (b)	Henry Handcock	Conservative	Keogh appointed judge of the Court of Common Pleas
1857	John Ennis	Independent Liberal	
1859	John Ennis	Liberal	
1865	Denis Rearden	Liberal	
1868	Sir John Ennis	Liberal	
1874	Edward Sheil	Home Rule	
1880	Sir John Ennis	Liberal	
1884 (b)	Justin Huntly McCarthy	Irish National League	
1885	Constituency abolished: See South Roscommon and South Westmeath		

== Elections ==
=== Elections in the 1880s ===
By-election, 12 June 1884: Athlone
Party	Candidate	Votes	%	±%
Irish Parliamentary	Justin Huntly McCarthy	Unopposed		
Registered electors		365		
Irish Parliamentary gain from Liberal				

- Caused by Ennis' death.

General election 1880: Athlone
Party	Candidate	Votes	%	±%
Liberal	John Ennis	163	50.2	+1.0
Home Rule	Edward Sheil	162	49.8	−1.0
Majority		1	0.4	N/A
Turnout		325	90.3	+4.5
Registered electors		360		
Liberal gain from Home Rule		Swing	+1.0	

=== Elections in the 1870s ===
General election 1874: Athlone
Party	Candidate	Votes	%	±%
Home Rule	Edward Sheil	153	50.8	New
Liberal	John Ennis	148	49.2	−8.9
Majority		5	1.6	N/A
Turnout		301	85.8	+2.2
Registered electors		351		
Home Rule gain from Liberal		Swing		

- The original count for the 1874 election had both candidates receiving 140 votes. However, on petition, the poll was amended to the above figures.

=== Elections in the 1860s ===
General election 1868: Athlone
Party	Candidate	Votes	%	±%
Liberal	John Ennis	154	57.9	+26.0
Conservative	Robert Preston Bayley	111	41.7	+30.5
Liberal	John Staniforth (1832-1894)	1	0.4	N/A
Majority		43	16.2	−8.8
Turnout		266	83.6	+7.2
Registered electors		318		
Liberal hold		Swing	−2.3	

General election 1865: Athlone
Party	Candidate	Votes	%	±%
Liberal	Denis Rearden	107	56.9	N/A
Liberal	John Ennis	60	31.9	−29.4
Conservative	George Handcock	21	11.2	−27.5
Majority		47	25.0	+2.4
Turnout		188	76.4	−8.5
Registered electors		246		
Liberal hold		Swing		

=== Elections in the 1850s ===
General election 1859: Athlone
Party	Candidate	Votes	%	±%
Liberal	John Ennis	117	61.3	−5.4
Conservative	Robert Preston Bayley	74	38.7	+5.4
Majority		43	22.6	−10.8
Turnout		191	84.9	−0.8
Registered electors		225		
Liberal hold		Swing	−5.4	

General election 1857: Athlone
Party	Candidate	Votes	%	±%
Independent Irish	John Ennis	100	66.7	−23.0
Conservative	Henry Handcock	50	33.3	+23.0
Majority		50	33.4	−46.0
Turnout		150	85.7	+32.1
Registered electors		175		
Independent Irish hold		Swing	−23.0	

By-election, 14 April 1856: Athlone
Party	Candidate	Votes	%	±%
Conservative	Henry Handcock	82	53.9	+43.6
Peelite	John Ennis	70	46.1	N/A
Majority		12	7.8	N/A
Turnout		152	86.9	+33.3
Registered electors		175		
Conservative gain from Independent Irish		Swing		

- Caused by Keogh's resignation after being appointed a judge of the Court of Common Pleas

By-election, 7 March 1855: Athlone
Party	Candidate	Votes	%	±%
Peelite	William Keogh	Unopposed		
Peelite gain from Independent Irish				

- Caused by Keogh's appointment as Attorney-General for Ireland

By-election, 23 April 1853: Athlone
Party	Candidate	Votes	%	±%
Peelite	William Keogh	79	66.4	−23.3
Whig	Thomas Norton	40	33.6	New
Majority		39	32.8	N/A
Turnout		119	70.0	+16.4
Registered electors		170		
Peelite gain from Independent Irish		Swing		

- Caused by Keogh's appointment as Solicitor-General for Ireland

General election 1852: Athlone
Party	Candidate	Votes	%	±%
Independent Irish	William Keogh	87	89.7	+38.2
Conservative	Robert Bartholomew Lawes	10	10.3	New
Majority		77	79.4	N/A
Turnout		97	53.6	+7.3
Registered electors		181		
Independent Irish gain from Peelite		Swing		

=== Elections in the 1840s ===
General election 5 August 1847: Athlone
Party	Candidate	Votes	%	±%
Peelite	William Keogh	101	51.5	N/A
Repeal	John L M O'Beirne	95	48.5	New
Majority		6	3.0	N/A
Turnout		196	46.3	+32.6
Registered electors		423		
Peelite gain from Conservative		Swing		

By-election, 4 April 1843: Athlone
Party	Candidate	Votes	%	±%
Whig	John Collett	114	51.4	+15.2
Conservative	George Beresford	108	48.6	−15.2
Majority		6	2.8	N/A
Turnout		222	64.9	+51.2
Registered electors		342		
Whig gain from Conservative		Swing		

- Caused by the previous election being declared void on petition. Originally, Farrell had been declared elected, with the poll amended to 110 votes for Farrell and 60 votes for Beresford, but a counter-petition was successful and a new writ was issued.

General election 8 July 1841: Athlone
Party	Candidate	Votes	%	±%
Conservative	George Beresford	30	63.8	New
Whig	Daniel Farrell	17	36.2	N/A
Majority		13	27.6	N/A
Turnout		47	13.7	N/A
Registered electors		342		
Conservative gain from Radical		Swing		

=== Elections in the 1830s ===
General election 4 August 1837: Athlone
Party	Candidate	Votes	%
Radical	John O'Connell	Unopposed	
Registered electors		385	
Radical gain from Conservative			

General election 12 January 1835: Athlone
Party	Candidate	Votes	%	±%
Conservative	George Benvenuto Mathew	96	53.6	+8.2
Whig	James Talbot	83	46.4	−8.2
Majority		13	7.2	N/A
Turnout		179	65.3	−28.9
Registered electors		274		
Conservative gain from Whig		Swing	−8.2	

General election 15 December 1832: Athlone
Party	Candidate	Votes	%	±%
Whig	James Talbot	125	54.6	+46.3
Tory	Richard Handcock	104	45.4	−46.3
Majority		21	9.2	N/A
Turnout		229	94.2	c. +43.5
Registered electors		243		
Whig gain from Tory		Swing	+46.3	

General election 4 May 1831: Athlone
Party	Candidate	Votes	%	±%
Tory	Richard Handcock	33	91.7	−2.7
Whig	James Talbot	3	8.3	+2.7
Majority		30	83.4	−5.4
Turnout		36	c. 50.7	c. ±0.0
Registered electors		c. 71		
Tory hold		Swing		

General election 6 August 1830: Athlone
Party	Candidate	Votes	%
Tory	Richard Handcock	34	94.4
Whig	James Talbot	2	5.6
Majority		32	88.8
Turnout		36	c. 50.7
Registered electors		c. 71	
Tory hold			

== Sources ==
- The Parliaments of England by Henry Stooks Smith (1st edition published in three volumes 1844–50), 2nd edition edited (in one volume) by F.W.S. Craig (Political Reference Publications 1973)
- Walker, Brian M., ed. (1978). Parliamentary Election Results in Ireland, 1801–1922. Dublin: Royal Irish Academy. pp. 197, 251–252. ISBN 0901714127.
- Leigh Rayment's Historical List of MPs – Constituencies beginning with "A" (part 3)
- Jupp, P. J. (1986). "Athlone". In Thorne, R. (ed.). The History of Parliament: the House of Commons 1790–1820. The History of Parliament.
- Salmon, Philip (2009). "Athlone". In Fisher, D. R. (ed.). The History of Parliament: the House of Commons 1820–1832. The History of Parliament.
