= William Handcock, 1st Viscount Castlemaine =

British politician (1767–1840)

William Handcock, 1st Viscount Castlemaine, PC (Ire) (28 August 1761 – 7 January 1839) was an Irish MP and a supporter of the union of Ireland with Great Britain.

== Life ==
He was born in Dublin, Ireland, Great Britain to Reverend Richard Handcock and Sarah Toler. In 1783, Handcock stood for Athlone in the Irish House of Commons and represented the constituency until the Acts of Union in 1801. He was Constable and Governor of Athlone 1813–1839 and Governor of County Westmeath 1814–1831.

Handcock was killed on the Night of the Big Wind in 1839 when the wind blew his bedroom shutters open at Moydrum Castle and hurled him “so violently upon his back that he instantly expired”.

=== Namesake ===
The Australian town of Castlemaine in the state of Victoria was named in his honour by nephew William Wright in 1854 who was the Commissioner of Crown Lands. At the time, the area for which Castlemaine was named was located in the pre-Australian Federation Colony of Victoria.

== Family and title ==
On 20 March 1782 he married Lady Florinda Trench (3 August 1766 – 9 February 1851), born in Twyford, Westmeath to William Power Keating Trench, 1st Earl of Clancarty and Anne Gardiner, Countess of Clancarty. William and Florinda had no children, and when Handcock was created Baron Castlemaine, of Moydrum (in the Peerage of Ireland) on 21 December 1812 the title had a special remainder "failing heirs of his body to his brother". He was further created Viscount Castlemaine on 12 January 1822 but without a special remainder.

On his death the viscountcy became extinct. His barony passed to his brother, whose descendants still hold the title.

== Arms ==
Coat of arms of William Handcock, 1st Viscount Castlemaine
Crest A demi-lion rampant Azure holding between the paws a fusil Argent charged with a cock Gules. Escutcheon Ermine on a chief Sable a dexter hand between two cocks Argent armed crested and jelloped Gules. Supporters Dexter a lion guardant Azure sinister a cock Proper. Motto Vigilate Et Orat

Parliament of Ireland
Preceded by William Handcock; Sir Richard St George, 1st Bt	Member of Parliament for Athlone; 1783–1801; With: Sir Richard St George, 1st Bt 1783–1789; Sir Richard St George, 2nd Bt 1789–1800; Richard Handcock 1800–1801	Succeeded by Parliament of the United Kingdom
Parliament of the United Kingdom
New constituency	Member of Parliament for Athlone; 1801–1803	Succeeded by Thomas Tyrwhitt Jones
Peerage of Ireland
New creation	Viscount Castlemaine; 1822–1839	Extinct
New creation	Baron Castlemaine; 1812–1839	Succeeded by Richard Handcock
