= Richard Handcock, 3rd Baron Castlemaine =

Irish peer and Tory politician (1791–1869)

Richard Handcock, 3rd Baron Castlemaine (17 November 1791 – 4 July 1869) was an Irish peer and Tory politician.

== Background and education ==
Castlemaine was the eldest son of Richard Handcock, 2nd Baron Castlemaine, and Anne, daughter of Arthur French. He was educated at Trinity College, Cambridge.

== Political career ==
Castlemaine was returned to Parliament for Athlone in 1826, a seat he held until 1832. He succeeded his father in the barony in 1840 and was elected an Irish representative peer in 1841.

== Family ==
Lord Castlemaine married Margaret, daughter of Michael Harris, in 1822. They had two sons and two daughters. She died in January 1867. Lord Castlemaine survived her by two years and died in July 1869, aged 77. He was succeeded in the barony by his eldest son, Richard.

== Arms ==
Coat of arms of Richard Handcock, 3rd Baron Castlemaine
| Crest A demi-lion rampant Azure holding between the paws a fusil Argent charged with a cock Gules. Escutcheon Ermine on a chief Sable a dexter hand between two cocks Argent armed crested and jelloped Gules. Supporters Dexter a lion guardant Azure sinister a cock Proper. Motto Vigilate Et Orat |

Parliament of the United Kingdom
| Preceded by David Ker | Member of Parliament for Athlone; 1826–1832 | Succeeded by James Talbot |
Peerage of Ireland
| Preceded by Richard Handcock | Baron Castlemaine; 1840–1869 | Succeeded by Richard Handcock |
Political offices
| Preceded by The Earl Belmore | Representative peer for Ireland; 1841–1869 | Succeeded by The Lord Oranmore and Browne |
