= List of Brigade of Guards recipients of the Victoria Cross =

The Victoria Cross

This is a list of Brigade of Guards recipients of the Victoria Cross. The Victoria Cross (VC) is a military decoration that may be bestowed upon members of the British or Commonwealth armed forces for acts of valour or gallantry performed in the face of the enemy. Within the British honours system and those of many Commonwealth nations it is the highest award a soldier can receive for actions in combat. It was established in 1856 and since then has been awarded 1,356 times, including three service personnel who were awarded the VC twice.

The VC was introduced on 29 January 1856 by Queen Victoria to reward acts of valour during the Crimean War. The traditional explanation of the source of the gunmetal from which the medals are struck is that it derives from Russian cannon captured at the siege of Sevastopol. Recent research has thrown doubt on this story, suggesting a variety of origins. The original Royal Warrant did not contain a specific clause regarding posthumous awards, although official policy was to not award the VC posthumously. Between 1897 and 1901, several notices were issued in the London Gazette regarding soldiers who would have been awarded the VC had they survived. In a partial reversal of policy in 1902, six of the soldiers mentioned were granted the VC, but not "officially" awarded the medal. In 1907, the posthumous policy was completely reversed and medals were sent to the next of kin of the six officers and men. The Victoria Cross warrant was not officially amended to explicitly allow posthumous awards until 1920 but one quarter of all awards for the First World War were posthumous.

Due to its rarity, the VC is highly prized and the medal has fetched over £400,000 at auction. A number of public and private collections are devoted to the Victoria Cross. The private collection of Lord Ashcroft, amassed since 1986, contains over one-tenth of all VCs awarded. Following a 2008 donation to the Imperial War Museum, the Ashcroft collection went on public display alongside the museum's Victoria and George Cross collection in November 2010. Since 1990, three Commonwealth countries that retain the Queen as head of state have instituted their own versions of the VC. As a result, the original Victoria Cross is sometimes referred to as the "Commonwealth Victoria Cross" or the "Imperial Victoria Cross", to distinguish it from the newer awards.

The peacetime role of the Brigade of Guards is mostly ceremonial, wearing their distinctive red uniforms, guarding the British royal family and their residences. However like the rest of the British Army, during wartime they take their place in the front line. Sometimes as individual battalions attached to other formations, or as during the First World War and the Second World War forming complete divisions. (Note: The infantry Guards Division during the First World War and the Guards Armoured Division during the Second World War.) Since the Victoria Cross was introduced there have been forty-four awards to members of the Brigade of Guards. The first during the Crimean War, when it was awarded twelve times to members of the then three guards regiments. (Note: The Grenadier Guards, the Coldstream Guards and the Scots Fusilier Guards. The Scots Guards were known as the Scots Fusilier Guards between 1831 and 1877.) By the First World War, the number of guards regiments had increased to five and the number of recipients during the conflict was twenty-four, and a further eight men became recipients during the Second World War. (Note: The Irish Guards were formed on 1 April 1900, and the Welsh Guards on 1 March 1915.) The last award of a VC to a member of the Brigade of Guards was in June 2012 to James Ashworth of the Grenadier Guards.

== Guards recipients ==
Name	Regiment	Date	Conflict	Location
Alfred Ablett	Grenadier Guards	2 September 1855	Crimean War	Sevastopol
James Ashworth	Grenadier Guards	13 June 2012	Afghanistan	Helmand Province
Edward Barber	Grenadier Guards	12 March 1915	First World War	Neuve Chapelle
George Boyd-Rochfort	Scots Guards	3 August 1915	First World War	Cambrin
Oliver Brooks	Coldstream Guards	8 October 1915	First World War	Loos
Robert Bye	Welsh Guards	31 July 1917	First World War	Yser Canal
James Craig	Scots Fusiliers Guards (Note: The Scots Guards was named as the Scots Fusilier Guards between 1831 and 1877.)	6 September 1855	Crimean War	Sevastopol
John Campbell	Coldstream Guards	15 September 1916	First World War	Ginchy
Edward Charlton	Irish Guards	21 April 1945	Second World War	Wistedt
Frederick Dobson	Coldstream Guards	28 September 1914	First World War	Chavanne
Cyril Frisby	Coldstream Guards	27 September 1918	First World War	Canal du Nord
Wilfred Fuller	Grenadier Guards	12 March 1915	First World War	Neuve Chapelle
Christopher Furness	Welsh Guards	17–24 May 1940	Second World War	Arras
Gerald Goodlake	Coldstream Guards	28 October 1854	Crimean War	Inkerman
William Holmes	Grenadier Guards	9 October 1918	First World War	Cattenieres
Thomas Jackson	Coldstream Guards	27 September 1918	First World War	Canal du Nord
John Kenneally	Irish Guards	28 April 1943	Second World War	Dj Bou Arada
John Knox	Scots Fusiliers Guards	20 September 1854	Crimean War	Alma
Ian Liddell	Coldstream Guards	3 April 1945	Second World War	Lingen
Robert Lindsay	Scots Fusiliers Guards	20 September 1854	Crimean War	Alma
Charles Lyell	Scots Guards	22–27 April 1943	Second World War	Dj Bou Arada
James MacKenzie	Scots Guards	19 December 1914	First World War	Rouges Bancs
James Marshall	Irish Guards	4 November 1918	First World War	Sambre-Oise Canal
John McAulay	Scots Guards	27 November 1917	First World War	Fontaine Notre Dame
James McKechnie	Scots Fusiliers Guards	20 September 1854	Crimean War	Alma
Frederick McNess	Scots Guards	15 September 1916	First World War	Ginchy
John Moyney	Irish Guards	12–13 September 1917	First World War	Broembeek
Harry Nicholls	Grenadier Guards	21 May 1940	Second World War	River Escaut
Michael O'Leary	Irish Guards	1 February 1915	First World War	Cuinchy
Anthony Palmer	Grenadier Guards	5 November 1854	Crimean War	Inkerman
George Paton	Grenadier Guards	1 December 1917	First World War	Gonnelieu
Henry Percy	Grenadier Guards	5 November 1854	Crimean War	Inkerman
Thomas Pryce	Grenadier Guards	11–12 April 1918	First World War	Vieux-Berquin
William Reynolds	Scots Fusiliers Guards	20 September 1854	Crimean War	Alma
John Rhodes	Grenadier Guards	9 October 1917	First World War	Houthulst Forest
Charles Russell	Grenadier Guards	5 November 1854	Crimean War	Inkerman
William Sidney	Grenadier Guards	8–9 February 1944	Second World War	Anzio
William Stanlake	Coldstream Guards	26 October 1854	Crimean War	Inkerman
George Strong	Coldstream Guards	September 1855	Crimean War	Sevastopol
John Vereker	Grenadier Guards	27 September 1918	First World War	Canal du Nord
Thomas Whitham	Coldstream Guards	31 July 1917	First World War	Pilkem
Thomas Woodcock	Irish Guards	12–13 September 1917	First World War	Broenbeek
Harry Wood	Scots Guards	13 October 1918	First World War	St. Python
Peter Wright	Coldstream Guards	25 September 1943	Second World War	Salerno
George Wyatt	Coldstream Guards	25–26 August 1914	First World War	Landrecies
