= History of the Scots Guards (1914–1945) =

This article details the history of the Scots Guards from 1914 to 1945. The Scots Guards (SG) is a regiment of the Guards Division of the British Army. The Scots Guards trace their origins back to 1642 when, by order of King Charles I, the regiment was raised by Archibald Campbell, 1st Marquess of Argyll for service in Ireland, and was known as the Marquis of Argyll's Royal Regiment.

== Pre–World War I ==
See Scots Guards (1805).

== World War I ==
On 28 June 1914, Archduke Franz Ferdinand and his wife the Countess Sophie were assassinated by a Serbian nationalist. This event triggered the First World War that would eventually lead every major power on the continent and the United Kingdom into war by August, a war that would affect much of the world.

The 3rd (Reserve) Battalion was re-formed in August, though would not see service abroad, and would remain in the UK for the duration of the war, and was disbanded in 1919. Also in August, the 1st Battalion, part of the 1st Guards Brigade of the 1st Division, departed for foreign shores, arriving in France as part of the British Expeditionary Force (BEF). The first engagement of the war came at Mons where British forces successfully defended against the Germans, inflicting very heavy casualties on them, so much so that they believed the British Army had used far more machine-guns than they had actually used. Despite the victory, due to overwhelming German numbers, as well as the retreat of the French, the British had to withdraw from Mons. The retreat effectively saved the BEF and the French and kept the British in France to continue the fight against the Germans.

In September the 1st Battalion took part in its second major engagement, at the First Battle of the Marne, which saw the Germans advance halted after much bitter fighting, with the Germans eventually going into retreat. The sides soon dug-in, the trenches that would be made would become one of the defining symbols of the First World War. The battalion subsequently took part in the Battle of the Aisne where the battalion saw heavy fighting, including at the Aisne Heights and Chivy. In November, the 2nd Battalion landed in France as part of the 20th Guards Brigade of the 7th Division. Both battalions as part of their respective divisions, took part in the First Battle of Ypres which took place between September and November. Both battalions saw very heavy fighting at Ypres and in the surrounding area, which eventually saw over 50,000 British soldiers of the Regular army become casualties, though the British Army held the line against seemingly overwhelming German attacks, stopping the final German attempt to break the Allied line in 1914.

The regiment saw further involvement in the bitter cold month of December, and in that month, on 19 December, Private James Mackenzie of the 2nd Battalion won the regiment its first Victoria Cross (VC) of the war, and the first VC won by the Scots Guards, rather than its predecessor name, the Scots Fusilier Guards. He was awarded the VC after he, under very heavy enemy fire and after a stretcher party had been forced to abandon its rescue attempt, came to the assistance of a British soldier severely wounded in front of the German trenches, and successfully brought him back to British lines. Private Mackenzie was killed later that day while performing a similar act of bravery.

In March 1915, the 2nd Battalion took part in the Battle of Neuve Chapelle, which was a relatively successful engagement, though it did fall short of its expected gains of advancing all the way to Lille. In May, both battalions took part in the Battle of Aubers, and later that month, the 2nd Battalion took part in the Battle of Festubert. On 3 August, Second Lieutenant George Arthur Boyd-Rochfort of the 1st Battalion was standing near a working party when a trench mortar bomb landed on the side of the parapet of the communications trench where he was standing. With no regard for his safety, Lieutenant Boyd-Rochfort shouted to the men to look out, and subsequently rushed to the bomb, grabbed it and duly threw it over the parapet where it instantly exploded. For his courageous actions, Lieutenant Boyd-Rochfort was awarded the Victoria Cross. Also in August, both battalions of the regiment were transferred from their respective divisions to the Guards Division. The 1st Battalion joined the 2nd Guards Brigade on 25 August, while the 2nd Battalion joined the 3rd Guards Brigade on 9 September.

In September, both battalions took part in the Battle of Loos. On 27 September, when the 3rd Guards Brigade (2nd Battalion) were moving in preparation to attack a German-held position known as Hill 70, via Loos, an artillery barrage caught them, causing many casualties among the Guards. The following day, the 2nd Guards Brigade (1st Battalion) attacked a position known as Puits 14 bis, and in the process, suffered very heavy casualties, forcing the brigade to halt the attack. Both battalions continued to experience heavy fighting throughout September, and into October, and by the end of the Battle of Loos, the regiment had suffered over 500 casualties.

On 1 July 1916, the first Battle of the Somme began, and on the very first day of the offensive, over 57,000 British soldiers became casualties. In September, the Scots Guards got involved in the Somme Offensive for the first, taking part in the subsidiary Battle of Flers–Courcelette, which saw the first introduction of the tank, and at another subsidiary battle, at Morval, where the Guards captured Lesboeufs. On 15 July, Lance-Sergeant Frederick McNess of the 1st Battalion, led a bombing party under very heavy shell and machine-gun fire. The party successfully reached the first enemy trench but found the left flank to be exposed, and the enemy were lobbing bombs. Sergeant McNess duly led a counter-attack, being badly wounded in the jaw and neck in the process. Despite the severe wounds the sergeant subsequently made a 'block', encouraged his men and continued to throw grenades until eventually succumbing to the loss of blood.

In July 1917, the regiment began its involvement in the Third Battle of Ypres, which lasted into November. The regiment took part in the subsidiary engagements at Pilckem, Menin Road, Poelcapelle, Passchendaele, experiencing very severe fighting which saw the British suffer very heavy casualties against stiff German defenders in terrible fighting conditions. In November, the regiment took part in the Battle of Cambrai (1917), most famous for the first large-scale use of British tanks, eventually 476 tanks in total, in battle.

On 27 November, Sergeant John McAulay, of the 1st Battalion, assumed command of his company after all its officers had become casualties, and under heavy shell and machine-gun fire, the company held and consolidated the company's gained objectives. The sergeant subsequently reorganised the company and upon noticing a counter-attack developing, he successfully repulsed it by skillfully exploiting machine-guns to his advantage to inflict very heavy casualties on the German attackers. Sergeant McAulay also carried a considerable distance to a safer location, while under heavy fire, the mortally wounded company commander. He performed valiantly in doing this duty, and did not waver, despite being knocked off his feet twice by shell blasts. For his heroic and professional actions, Sergeant McAulay was awarded the Victoria Cross.

In March 1918, the second Battle of the Somme began, and would last until April, though further Somme region would last until September. The regiment took part in the subsidiary battles at St. Quentin, Bapaume, Arras and Albert. In September, the regiment took part in the Battle of Havrincourt during the operations against the Hindenburg Line, as well as the Canal du Nord and, in October, took part in the Battle of Cambrai (1918).

On 13 October, Lance Corporal Harry Blanshard Wood of the 2nd Battalion, at St. Python, took command of his platoon, the leading platoon of the company, after the platoon sergeant was killed, under very heavy fire, during the advance on the village of St. Python. The company that Corporal Wood was part of, was tasked with taking the western half of the village and to secure the crossing of the River Selle, as well as secure the ruined bridge. However, the space in front of it was covered by snipers, but this did not deter Corporal Wood. The corporal took a large brick into the open space, lay behind it, and continuously shot at the snipers, ordering his men to get across the open space while he covered them, remaining in the open space until all his men had got across. Later that day, Corporal Wood drove off a number of German counter-attacks on his position, proving his professional and gallant leadership throughout the day. For his actions Corporal Wood was awarded the Victoria Cross, the last VC won by the regiment during the First World War.

The regiment took part in the final battles of the war on the Western Front, on 17 October, the Battle of the Selle began which eventually saw the town of Valenciennes captured by the Allies, and on 4 November took part in the Battle of the Sambre. At 11 am of 11 November, the Armistice was signed between the victorious Allies and the Germans. The Guards Division soon after the end of the war was ordered to the Rhine, eventually crossing the frontier on 11 December. The Scots Guards subsequently joined the British Army of Occupation in Cologne and returned home in 1919. For its part during the First World War, the regiment gained thirty-three battle honours though lost just under 3,000 men during the war.

== Inter-war ==
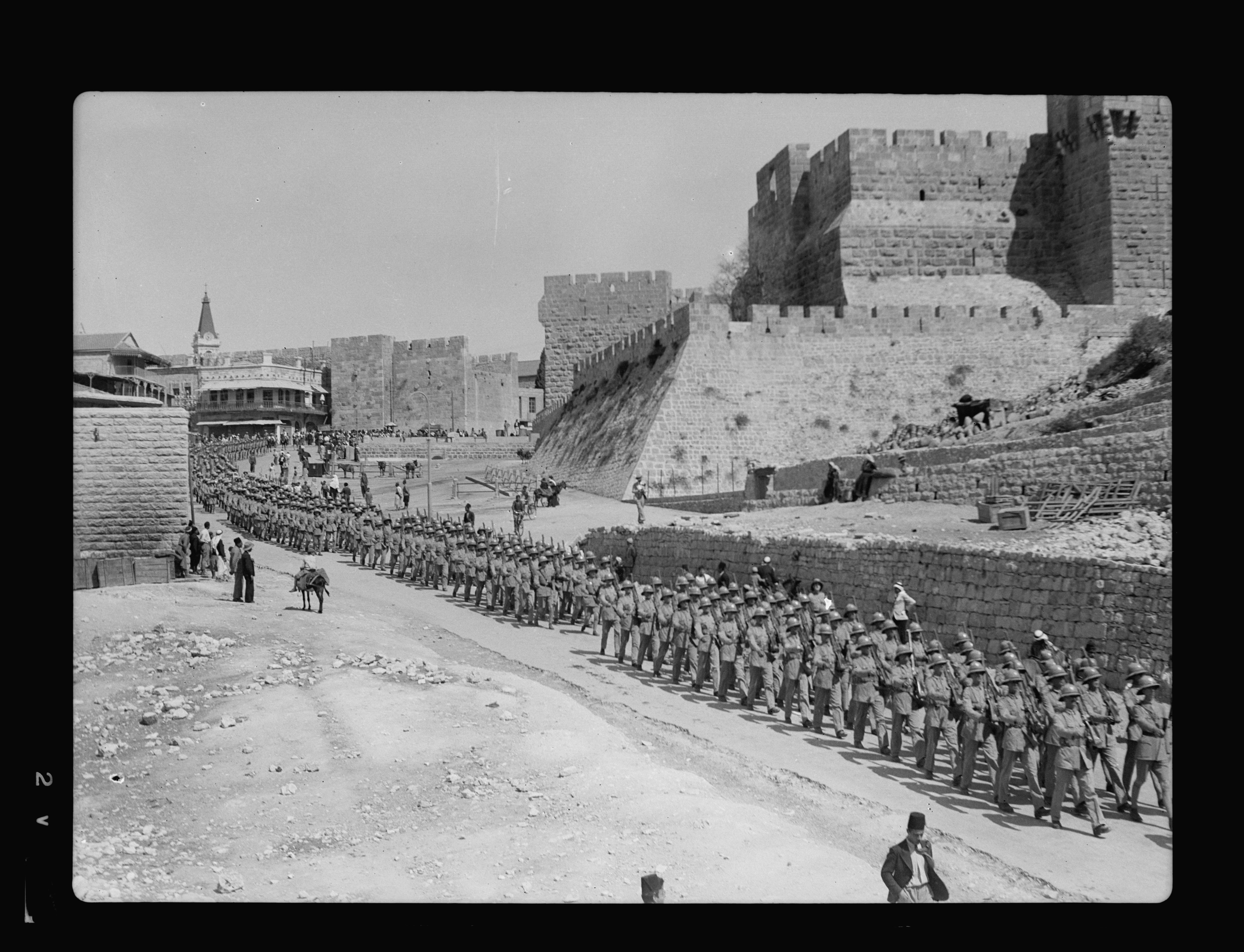
The Scots Guards marching in Jerusalem in 1936, from Jaffa Gate south along the road outside the Tower of David

In 1918, the rank of Private was replaced in the Foot Guards by the title Guardsman. The Scots Guards, while in Germany, joined the British Army of Occupation in Cologne before returning home in 1919, where it marched in London as part of the Guards Division. Both battalions would remain in the United Kingdom for the majority of the inter-war years where it carried out the usual public duties, though would, at times, be deployed abroad. In 1927, the 2nd Battalion departed for Shanghai in the Far East during the conflict between the Communists and Nationalists, with the dangers that this posed to the British populace living in Shanghai. The battalion was also stationed in Hong Kong before returning home in 1929.

In 1933, the regiment formed an alliance with the Winnipeg Grenadiers of Canada. In 1935, it was the 1st Battalion's turn to be deployed abroad when it was stationed in Egypt during the tense times between the British Empire and Italy, after the latter had invaded the East African nation of Abyssinia. In 1936, the 2nd Battalion deployed to Palestine, which was experiencing violent troubles during the Arab Revolt. That same year the alliance with the 13th Scottish Light Dragoons, of Canada, ended with the disbandment of that regiment. The regiment also gained two new colonels-in-chief with the accession of HM King Edward VIII and His Majesty King George VI, the latter ascended the throne after King Edward had abdicated. In 1938, the 2nd Battalion deployed to Egypt, where it would be stationed at the outbreak of the Second World War.

== World War II ==
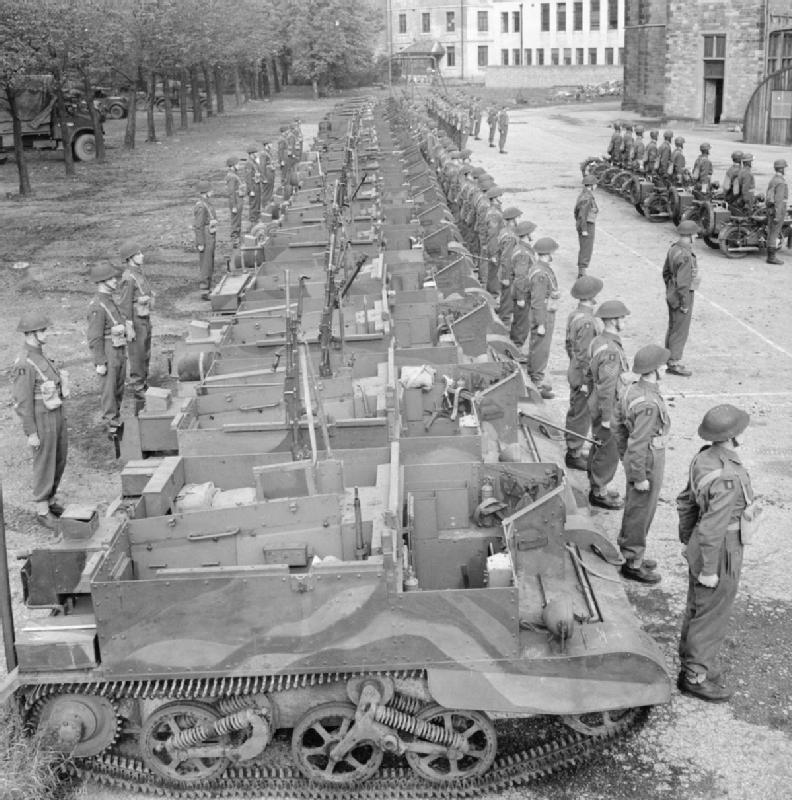
Universal Carriers of the 1st Battalion, Scots Guards on parade at the Royal Wanstead School, London, 9 October 1942.

On 1 September 1939 Nazi Germany invaded Poland. Two days later war was declared between the British Empire, France and Germany. In April 1940, the 1st Battalion, as part of the 24th Guards Brigade, took part in its first campaign of the war, during the expedition to Norway, and began to land in Harstad on 16 April. The 24th Guards Brigade was then used to protect a number of Norwegian ports from German attack, though all fell by the end of May, and, due to the troubling situation in France, the British Army began evacuating from Norway, which was completed by 8 June. Later that year, the 3rd Battalion was re-formed for the second time and joined the 30th Infantry Brigade, while the 4th Battalion and Holding Battalion was also raised.

=== North Africa ===
In the North African Campaign, as part of the 22nd Guards Brigade, the 2nd Battalion took part in fighting against the Italians in Egypt before the following year when it saw tough fighting in Libya, then controlled by Italy. Engagements that the regiment took part in were many, and it fought valiantly against tough opposition. In May, the regiment saw action at the Battle of Halfaya Pass, which saw British and Commonwealth forces experiencing tough fighting against Erwin Rommel's Afrika Korps. In June, the battalion was involved in Operation Battleaxe, a British/Commonwealth offensive push to relieve the besieged city of Tobruk, though the offensive saw stiff resistance from the enemy forces, and the Allies eventually had to withdraw in the face of numerically superior, and better armed Afrika Korps. The next British offensive did not come until November when Operation Crusader began, which was another attempt to break the siege of the Allied-held Tobruk, and unlike previous attempts, this operation succeeded, though it was a close-run thing which saw bitter heavy fighting and heavy losses, especially in tanks, with the operation ending in December. The Siege of Tobruk was finally lifted, with its defenders, mostly Australians, having held out since April. Back in the United Kingdom, the 3rd Battalion re-roled to an armoured battalion, being renamed 3rd (Tank) Battalion and joined the 6th Guards Armoured Brigade. Renamed 6th Guards Armoured Brigade when Artillery, Engineer & other units joined the brigade prior to crossing the Rhine on 24 March 1944.

In early 1942, Rommel's Afrika Korps started a new offensive which caught the Allies by surprise, forcing them into retreat, though the German offensive came to a halt in early February at Gazala. Later that year, the battalion joined the 201st Guards Brigade and in May the Germans launched another offensive against the Allies. The 201st Guards Brigade were located at a position known as Knightsbridge Box, with other 'Boxes' being manned by other British, Commonwealth and Free French brigades which formed the 'Gazala Line'. The Guards at Knightbridge saw heavy fighting against the attacking German forces, and by 13 June, the Guards were cut off from Allied forces, and eventually a German attack, during terrible weather, overran the 2nd Battalion and at night, after an Allied counter-attack by armoured units, the Guards eventually managed to withdraw in a professional manner. Soon after, most of the Allies were in retreat to the "El Alamein Line" and Tobruk eventually fell on 20 June, with many thousands of Allied troops being captured, including men of the 2nd Battalion, though some managed to escape to Egypt. The battalion was subsequently reformed back in Egypt.

Between October and November the Second Battle of El Alamein took place, which saw General Montgomery's British Eighth Army achieve a decisive victory over the German, which saw them go into full-retreat. By January 1943, the Allied armies had pushed the enemy back significantly, going as far as capturing Tripoli. Back in the UK, the 3rd Battalion was renamed the 3rd (Tank) Battalion and joined the 6th Guards Tank Brigade. In North Africa, on 6 March, the 2nd Battalion took part in the defensive Battle of Medenine, after the Germans had counter-attacked the Allies, an attack that, if it had succeeded, would have caused the British many problems. The Scots Guards performed valiantly, using their anti-tank guns to great effect against the German armour, with many German tanks being knocked out by the Guards and other regiments, and the German offensive was soon called off. That same month the 1st Battalion arrived in North Africa from the UK as part of the 24th Guards Brigade. Both battalions saw further engagements in North Africa, with the 1st Battalion seeing heavy fighting in April at Medjez Plain and Djebel Bou Aoukaz.

During that month, Captain The Lord Lyell of the 1st Battalion, commanded a company with great dash and valour during engagements between 23 and 27 April, taking part in tremendously heavy fighting against German forces and kept the morale of his troops high. On 27 April, Captain The Lord Lyell's company took part in the attack on Djebel Bou Aoukaz and were coming under fire from an enemy post, consisting of an 88 mm gun and heavy machine-gun in two separate pits, which was holding the company's advance up. Lord Lyell thus led an attack, consisting of a sergeant, a lance-corporal and two guardsmen on the post. Lord Lyell was ahead of the others by quite a bit and destroyed the machine-gun gun crew by grenade, and three of Lord Lyell's party became casualties, while the lance-corporal gave covering fire for Lord Lyell. Lord Lyell, with this covering fire, then attacked the pit containing the 88 mm gun with bayonet and pistol, killing several of the gun crew before being overwhelmed by the surviving gun crew and killed. The remaining crew then left and both guns were silenced, allowing the advance to continue. Lord Lyell was awarded the posthumous Victoria Cross for his courageous actions and leadership.

=== Italy and France ===
By May 1943, the battle for North Africa was over, Tunis had fallen, the Allies were victorious and 130,000 German and 120,000 Italian soldiers had surrendered. In September, the 2nd Battalion, as part of the 201st Guards Brigade, temporarily attached to the 56th (London) Infantry Division, took part in the landings at Salerno and subsequently saw heavy fighting during that month and in October took part in the crossing of the Volturno. At the Battle of Monte Cassino, the 2nd Battalion suffered heavy casualties in tough fighting though it was eventually captured in May 1944. In December, the 1st Battalion, as part of the 24th Guards Brigade of the British 1st Division, arrived in the Italian Theatre. In January 1944, the Scots Guards took part in the landings at Anzio and saw heavy fighting there, including at Campoleone and Carroceto, with the Allies not breaking out of the Anzio beachhead for a number of months. The 1st Battalion, as part of its brigade, joined the 6th South African Armoured Division in May. The regiment took part in many fierce engagements throughout 1944, including at Monte San Michele and against the Gothic Line, a formidable defensive line. In 1945, the regiment continued to take part in some bitter engagements, including in April when it took part in an amphibious landing of the Bonifica area, east of the Argenta Gap, where the 1st Battalion saw heavy fighting, receiving heavy casualties in the process. In May, the battalion found itself in Trieste which had been captured by Yugoslavian and Croatian forces. The battalion would remain in Trieste until 1946.

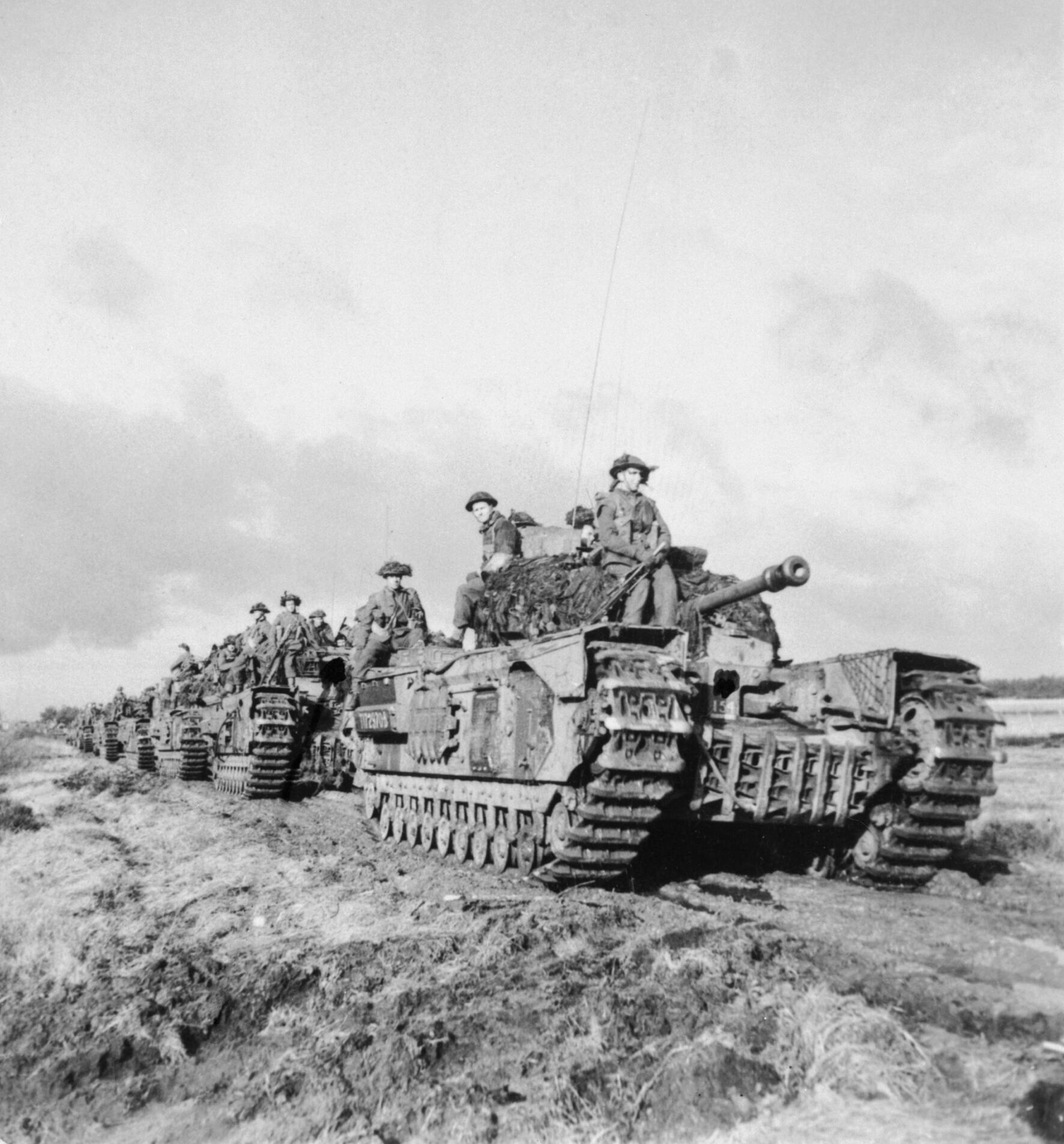
Churchill tanks of the 3rd Battalion, Scots Guards, 6th Guards Tank Brigade, with infantrymen of the 2nd Battalion, Argyll and Sutherland Highlanders, advance near Beringe in Holland, 22 November 1944.

Back in July 1944, the 3rd (Tank) Battalion landed in France, with heavy fighting still raging in the Normandy area. The battalion saw action at Mont Pincon, where at Quarry Hill, a squadron of the battalion was ambushed by three 8.8 cm armed Jagdpanther tank destroyers, who duly accounted for eleven Churchill tanks of the battalion who eventually forced the Germans to withdraw. The battalion saw further service taking part in the steady Allied advance, including at the Venlo Pocket in the Low Countries and in 1945, the Rhineland, where the battalion was involved in a variety of engagements. In March, the 2nd Battalion arrived in North-West Europe and joined the Guards Armoured Division. The regiment saw further engagements deeper inside Germany, including at Lingen and Uelzen. On 8 May, after six long years of war, the war in the European theatre was officially over, with the declaration of Victory in Europe Day and on 14 May, the regiment took control of the small German island of Heligoland. In June, the 3rd (Tank) Battalion re-roled to an infantry battalion, reverting to its original 3rd Battalion name, as part of the renamed 6th Guards Brigade. The 2nd and 3rd Battalions were stationed in Germany, and in early 1946, the 3rd Battalion was disbanded in Cologne-Weiden, while the 2nd Battalion returned home to the United Kingdom in December.

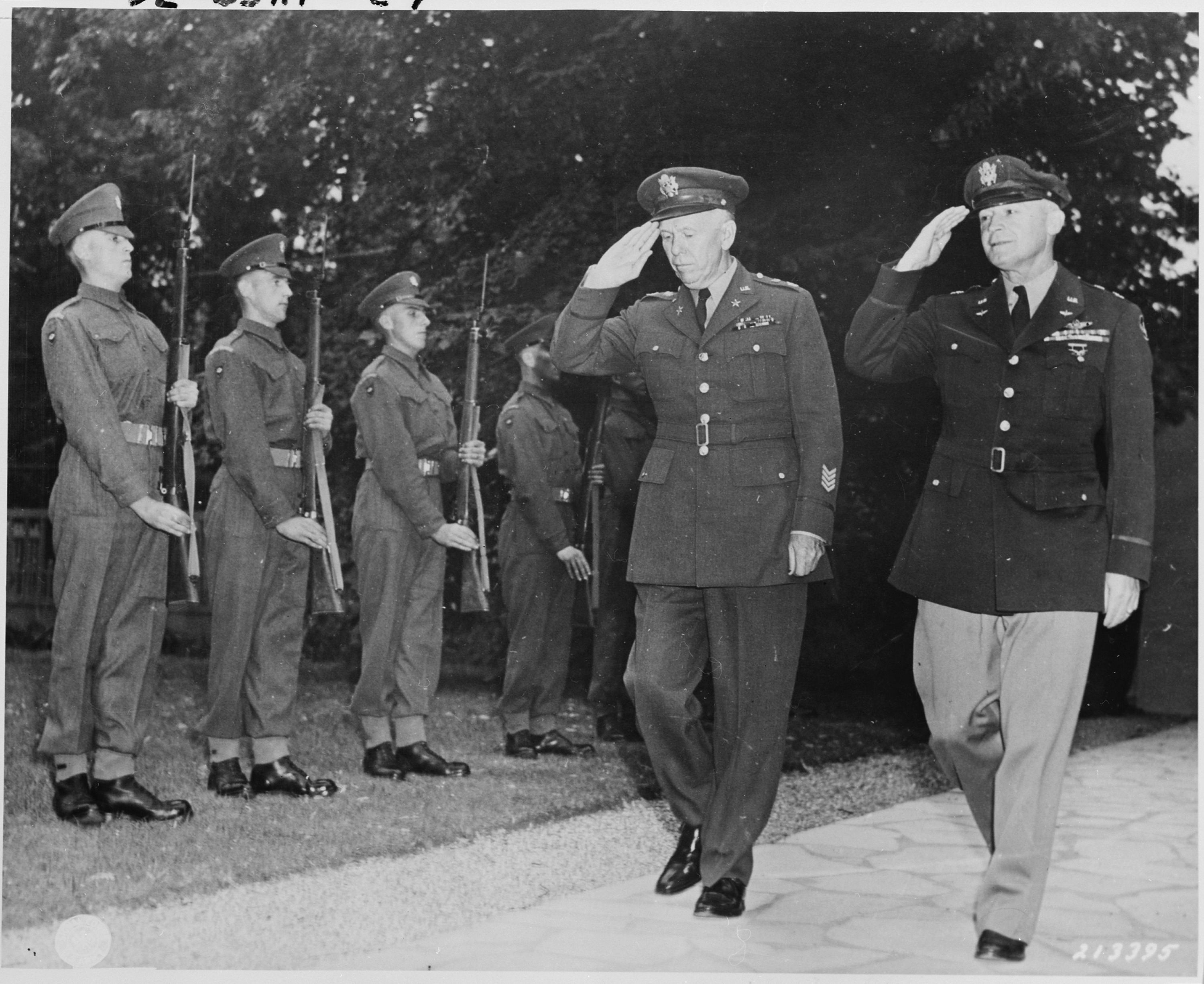
General George Marshall, the U. S. Army Chief of Staff, and General Henry H. Arnold, Commanding General of the U. S. Army Air Forces return the salute of the Guard of Honor formed by a detachment of Scots Guards of the British Brigade of Foot Guards, July 1945.

The regiment, as in the First World War, proved its professionalism once more, seeing service in North Africa, Italy and across North-West Europe, taking part in some of the British Army's most famous moments. During the war, just over 1,000 men of the Scots Guards lost their lives and many gallantry awards were won, including a single Victoria Cross.
