= Gordon Roberts =

Gordon Roberts may refer to:

- Gordon Roberts (ice hockey) (1891–1966), Canadian ice hockey forward
- Gordon Roberts (footballer) (1925–1991), English footballer
- Gordon Roberts (footballer, born 1946), Welsh footballer, see List of Bury F.C. players (1–24 appearances)
- Gordon Ray Roberts (born 1950), United States Army officer and Medal of Honor recipient
- Gordie Roberts (born 1957), American ice hockey defenseman
- Gordon the Tramp (born 1928), local celebrity in Bournemouth, with worldwide news coverage
