= Norman Jackson =

Norman Jackson may refer to:

- Norman Cyril Jackson (1919–1994), World War II Royal Air Force sergeant and VC recipient
- Norman Jackson (baseball) (1909–1980), Negro league baseball player

== See also ==
- Thomas Norman Jackson (1897–1918), World War I British Army lance corporal and VC recipient
