= Middleton Park (disambiguation) =

Middleton Park is a public park in Middleton, Leeds, West Yorkshire, England

Middleton Park may also refer to:

- Middleton Park (ward), a ward in Leeds, West Yorkshire, England
- Middleton Park House, a country house in Castletown Geoghegan, County Westmeath, Ireland
- Middleton Park, Oxfordshire, a country house in Middleton Stoney, Oxfordshire, England
- Middleton Park, an area of Bridge of Don, Aberdeen, Scotland
