= Thomas Woodcock =

Thomas Woodcock may refer to:

- Sir Thomas Woodcock (born 1951), Garter Principal King of Arms
- Thomas Woodcock (VC) (1888–1918), English soldier, recipient of the Victoria Cross
- Thomas Woodcock, the last prior of Beauvale Charterhouse
- Tommy Woodcock (1905–1985), Australian jockey and horse trainer
