= George Boyd-Rochfort =

Irish recipient of the Victoria Cross

George Arthur Boyd-Rochfort VC
- Born: 1 January 1880; Middleton Park House, County Westmeath, Ireland, United Kingdom of Great Britain and Ireland
- Died: 7 August 1940 (aged 60); Dublin, Ireland
- Burial place: Castletown Old Churchyard, County Westmeath, Ireland
- Relatives: Cecil Boyd-Rochfort (brother)
- Military career
- Allegiance: United Kingdom
- Branch: British Army
- Rank: Captain
- Units: Scots Guards
- Conflicts: World War I
- Awards: Victoria Cross

George Arthur Boyd-Rochfort VC (1 January 1880 – 7 August 1940) was an Irish recipient of the Victoria Cross, the highest and most prestigious award for gallantry in the face of the enemy that can be awarded to British and Commonwealth forces.

== Early life ==
Boyd-Rochfort was born on 1 January 1880, the eldest son of Major Rochfort Hamilton Boyd-Rochfort, and the grandson of George Augustus Boyd-Rochfort, both of Middleton Park House, County Westmeath, Ireland.

He was educated at Eton and Trinity College, Cambridge, where he was whip of the Trinity Foot Beagles.

He married Olivia Ellis Ussher, daughter of Christopher Ussher, of Eastwell, Loughrea, Co. Galway, at St Bartholomew's Church, Dublin in 1901.

In 1904, he was High Sheriff of Westmeath.

== Military career ==
Boyd-Rochfort was commissioned as a second lieutenant in the Scots Guards in April 1915.

He was 35 years old, and a second lieutenant in the Scots Guards, British Army, (Special Reserve, attached to 1st Battalion) during the First World War when the following deed took place for which he was awarded the VC.

At 2 a.m. on 3 August 1915 in the trenches between Cambrin and La Bassée, France, a German trench-mortar bomb landed on the side of the parapet of the communication trench in which Second Lieutenant Boyd-Rochfort was standing, close to a small working party of his battalion. Instead of stepping back into safety he shouted to his men to look out, rushed at the bomb, seized it and hurled it over the parapet where it at once exploded. This combination of presence of mind and courage saved the lives of many of the working party.

A description of the incident in Boyd-Rochfort's own words:

It was at break of day, just before we were ordered to "stand to," we were working in the first line of trenches, and a trench that was nothing more than a graveyard. The first German trench was no more than fifty yards away, and their mortars and rifle grenades were simply spilling into us. Our trench was getting badly knocked about by the flying missiles. You must distinguish between these mortars and shells, because the mortars have a time fuse which explodes them without striking. I was just raising my head over the front of the trench, and, hearing the whiz, I said to my men, "Look out." Down they went. The bomb landed, and started to roll down from the top of the trench. I dashed forward and seized it, and threw it over the top of trench. Scarcely had it left my hand and reached the outside of the trench than it exploded with a terrific report. We were all buried under falling earth, but fortunately no one was hurt, although my cap was blown to pieces. My men were very appreciative of my action, and cheered and thanked me. Afterwards they wrote and signed a statement of what I had done, which they handed to the Colonel.

Later Boyd-Rochfort was wounded in a single-handed fight with two Germans; he knocked one down with the butt-end of his empty revolver and the other with his fist. He was invalided home.

Boyd-Rochfort relinquished his commission in 1920 with the rank of captain.

== Later life ==
Boyd-Rochfort was a noted jockey and polo-player. After the war he became well known in Irish racing circles as an owner and breeder, and as senior steward of the Irish National Hunt Steeplechase Committee and a member of the Irish Turf Club. Boswell, the winner of the St Leger in 1936, and Precipitation, winner of the Ascot Gold Cup in 1937, were bred and reared at his stud at Middleton Park. His brother Cecil Boyd-Rochfort was a noted racehorse trainer.

He died at Dublin on 7 August 1940.

== Grave ==
He was buried in the Church of Ireland graveyard in Castletown Geoghegan, County Westmeath. His memorial was rededicated after refurbishment on 3 August 2015.

== Medals ==
His Victoria Cross and other medals are displayed at The Guards Regimental Headquarters (Scots Guards RHQ) in Wellington Barracks, London.

== See also ==
- History of the Scots Guards (1914–1945)
- List of Brigade of Guards recipients of the Victoria Cross
