= Gordon the Tramp =

Local figure of Bournemouth, England

- Born: Gordon Desmond Roberts; 1928; Boscombe, Dorset, England
- Died: 19 November 2023 (aged 94); Bournemouth, Dorset, England
- Other names: Gordon Bobby Roberts
- Known for: Local figure

Gordon Desmond Roberts (1928 – 19 November 2023), also known as Gordon Bobby Roberts, but better known as Gordon the Tramp, was a resident of Bournemouth and a well-known local figure in the town, who was famous for always knowing the correct time even though he did not own a watch.

Roberts was a well known character in Bournemouth with his large beard and Manchester United scarf, which he wore to all the AFC Bournemouth games. Despite his nickname, Roberts was not actually a homeless man as he owned a house in Charminster, Bournemouth.

== Early life ==
Roberts was born in 1928 in Boscombe Hospital. He was one of 12 children, having six brothers and six sisters.

For 30 years, Roberts worked on a farm, before the land was built over by the Hampshire Centre shopping complex, before this later became Castlepoint Shopping Centre.

== Gordon 'The Tramp' ==
Roberts became a well-known face in Bournemouth and his dishevelled appearance of a long, bushy beard and straggly hair, earned him the nickname 'The Tramp'. Despite his appearance suggesting that he was homeless, Roberts owned a house in the Charminster area of Bournemouth, where, as of 2007, he had lived for 50 years.

== Internet phenomenon ==
In 2007, a Facebook group in Roberts' honour was set up by former Bournemouth University student, Chris Kimber. As time passed, people started joining the group from outside the local area, whereby Roberts became an internet phenomenon, amassing 14,685 people being part of the group. Fans uploaded pictures of themselves with Roberts and added stories about meeting him. The phenomenon was widely reported in many UK newspapers and had spread as far as the Netherlands and Australia.

On 13 January 2010, a Facebook group was set up proclaiming Roberts had died of a heart attack. However, it was soon discovered to be a hoax and shortly afterwards he was found alive and well in Bournemouth town centre. As of July 2011, an online campaign was underway to have Roberts carry the Olympic torch as it passed through Bournemouth. The singer/songwriter Julian Barry, who is also from Bournemouth, wrote a song titled 'Gordon The Tramp' about Gordon Roberts.

== Death ==
Roberts died at Royal Bournemouth Hospital on 19 November 2023, at the age of 94. His funeral was held at Bournemouth Crematorium on 21 December 2023.
