= John Moyney =

Irish recipient of the Victoria Cross

John Moyney VC
- Born: 8 January 1895; Rathdowney, County Laois
- Died: 10 November 1980 (aged 85); Roscrea, County Tipperary
- Military career
- Allegiance: United Kingdom
- Branch: British Army
- Rank: Sergeant
- Units: 2nd Battalion, Irish Guards
- Conflicts: World War I: Western Front
- Awards: Victoria Cross

Sergeant John Moyney VC (8 January 1895 – 10 November 1980) was an Irish recipient of the Victoria Cross, the highest and most prestigious award for gallantry in the face of the enemy that can be awarded to British and Commonwealth forces.

== Military career ==
John Moyney was born in Rathdowney, County Laois, Ireland. He was 22 years old, and a lance sergeant in the 2nd Battalion, Irish Guards, British Army during the First World War when the following deed took place for which he was awarded the VC.

On 12/13 September 1917 north of Broenbeek, Belgium, Lance-Sergeant Moyney was in command of 15 men forming two advanced posts. Surrounded by the enemy he held his post for 96 hours, having no water and very little food. On the fifth day, on the enemy advancing to dislodge him, he attacked them with bombs, while also using his Lewis gun with great effect. Finding himself surrounded, he led his men in a charge through the enemy and reached a stream, where he and a private (Thomas Woodcock) covered his party while they crossed unscathed, before crossing themselves under a shower of bullets.

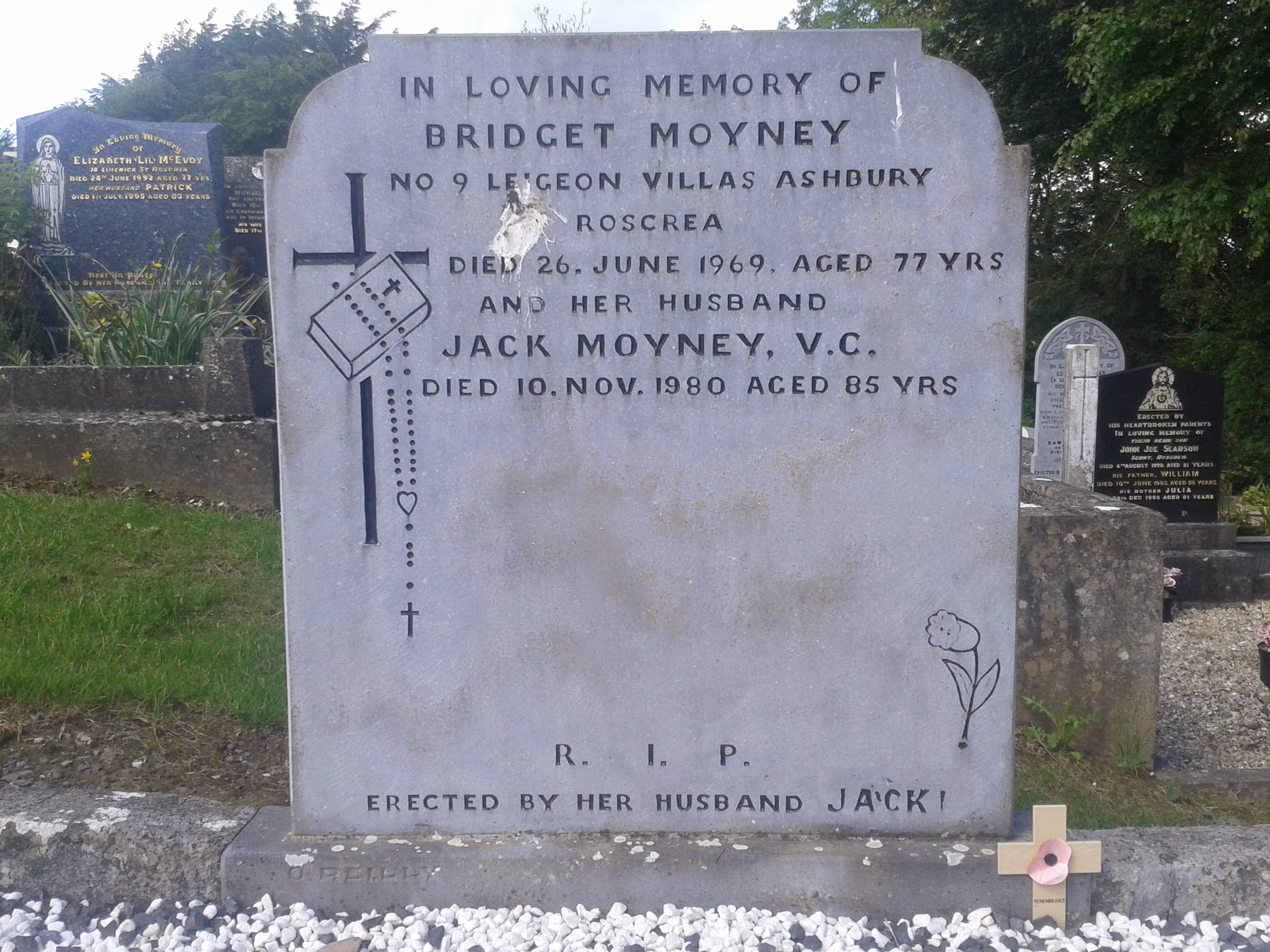
Gravestone of Jack Moyney V.C. in St. Cronan's Cemetery in Roscrea

Moyney later achieved the rank of sergeant. He died in Roscrea, County Tipperary on 10 November 1980. His Victoria Cross is displayed at the Guards Regimental Headquarters (Irish Guards RHQ), Wellington Barracks, London.

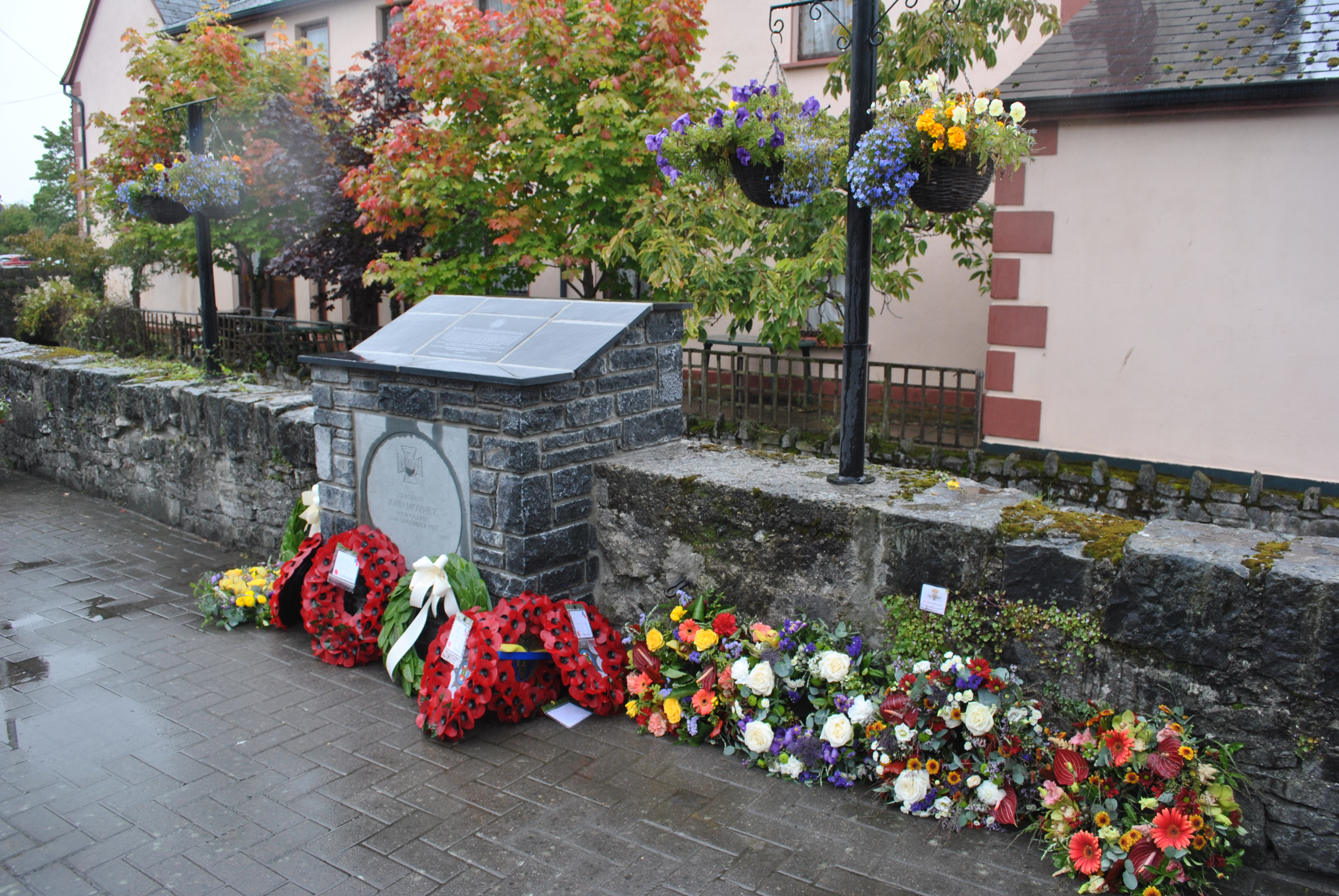
Memorial to John Moyney, V.C., at Mill Road, Rathdowney, Co. Laois.

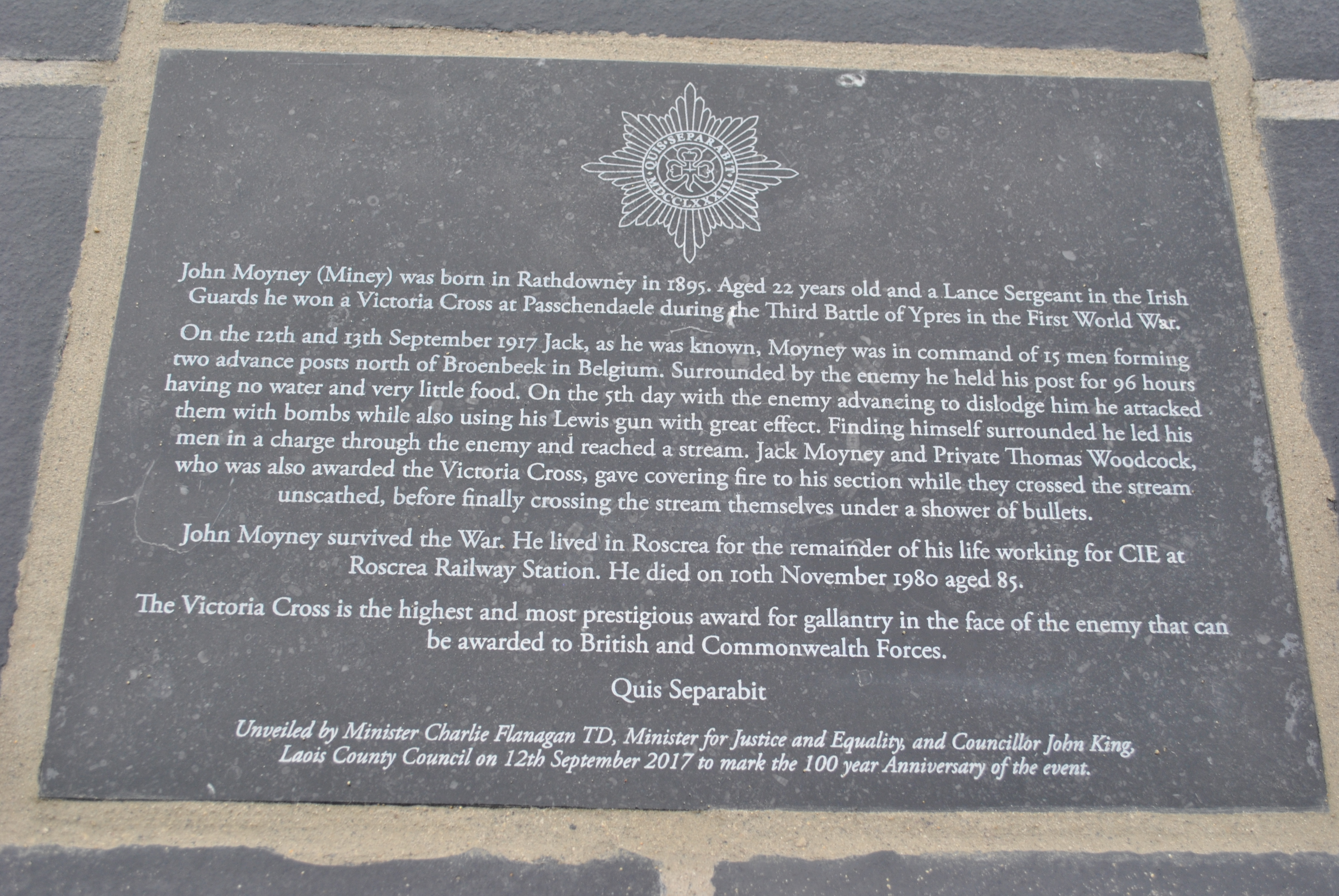
Upper plaque on the memorial to John Moyney, V.C, on Mill Road, Rathdowney, co. Laois.

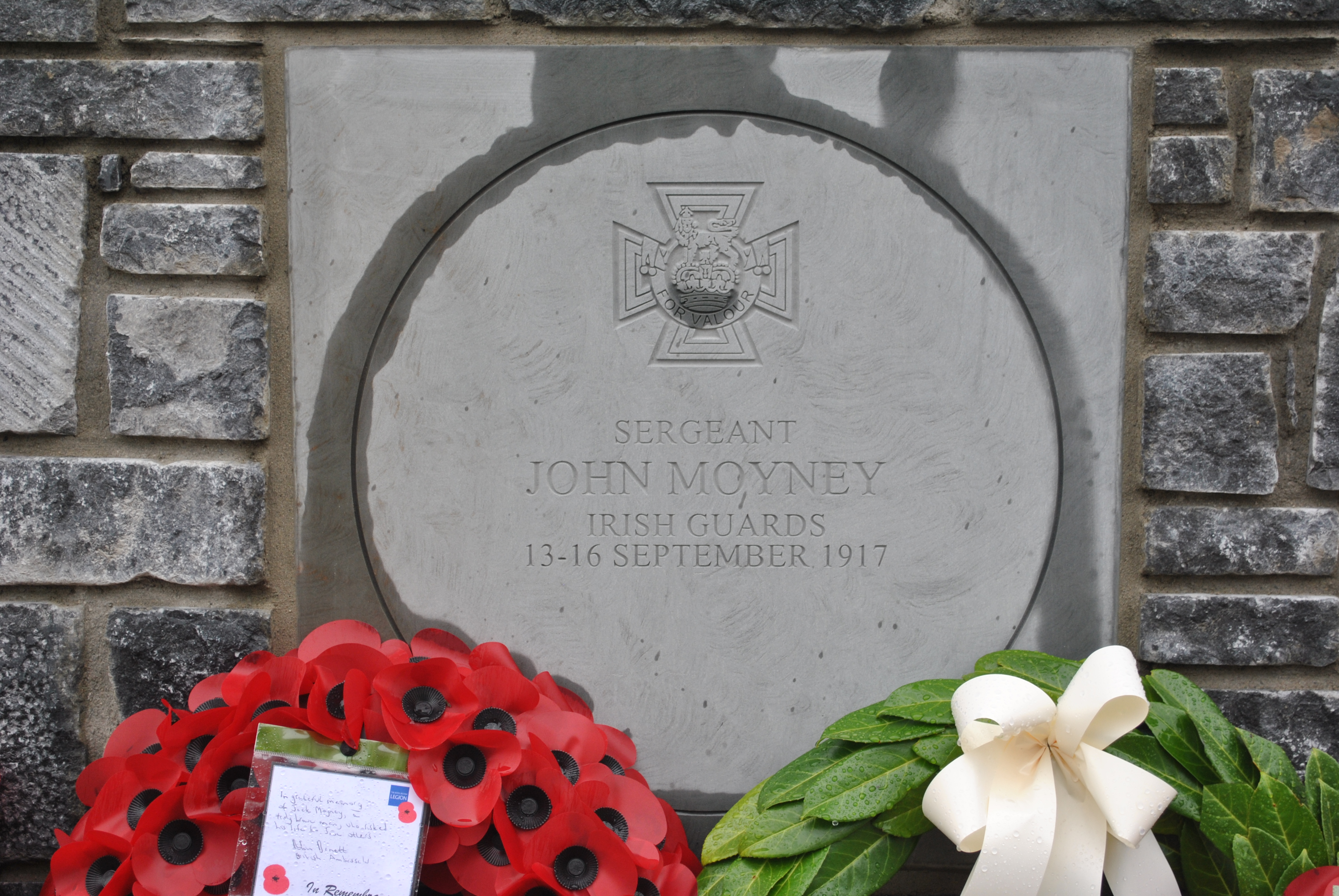
Facing plaque on the memorial to John Moyney, V.C, on Mill Road, Rathdowney, co. Laois.

On 12 September 2017 a memorial was unveiled on Mill Road, Rathdowney.
