= Middleton Park House =

House in westmeath

Coordinates: 53.435°N 7.472°W

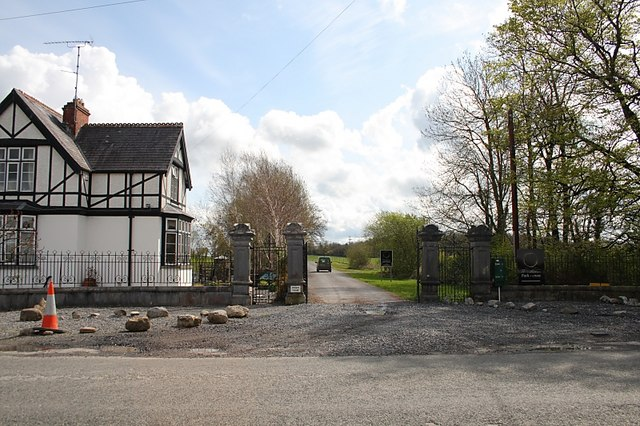
The entrance to Middleton Park House, in Co. Westmeath

Middleton Park House is a mid 19th-century country house in Castletown-Geoghegan, County Westmeath

It stands on a gentle hill on a kilometre-long avenue looking towards Lough Ennell. It is a detached six-bay two-storey building with the central two bays slightly projecting from the façade. It has a slate roof and a projecting single-storey limestone Ionic entrance portico. Other features of the house are its under-floor heating system, stone bifurcated staircase leading to the Gallery Landing and three-storey-high atrium lantern located in the Main Hall. At one end of the house is a cast-iron conservatory, one of only a few Richard Turner conservatories to be found in Ireland.

After many years of disrepair, the house was restored in mid-2007 and opened to the public as a commercial entity specialising in corporate events and private weddings and as a restaurant. This venture closed in 2016, with the house rapidly falling back in to disrepair. Restoration work to return it to use as family home began in 2019 and has been featured on an RTÉ TV series Great House Revival.

== History ==
Middleton Park House was built c. 1850 by George Boyd-Rochfort, who commissioned architect George Papworth to design it and oversee its construction. Drawings of part of the interior were exhibited by Papworth during the Royal Hibernian Annual Exhibition of 1850.

The Victoria Cross-winning soldier George Boyd-Rochfort and his younger brother, racehorse trainer Cecil Boyd-Rochfort, were born at Middleton Park. The house was host to a number of celebrities in the 1930s and 1940s, such as Rita Hayworth (who married Prince Aly Khan in 1949).

The House and estate remained in the Boyd-Rochfort family until the early 1960s when it was sold. Since then it has seen many owners, including gambler Barney Curley who raffled the House in 1986.
