= Bournemouth North Cemetery and Bournemouth Crematorium =

Historic cemetery in Dorset, England

Bournemouth North Cemetery
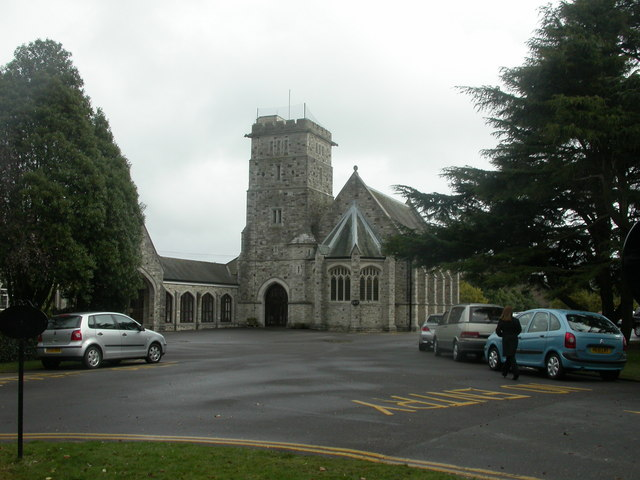
- Bournemouth Crematorium
- Interactive map of Bournemouth North Cemetery

Details
- Established: 1931
- Location: Strouden Avenue, Bournemouth
- Country: UK
- Coordinates: 50°44′47″N 1°51′20″W
- Type: Cemetery
- Owned by: Bournemouth, Christchurch and Poole Council
- Find a Grave: Bournemouth North Cemetery

Bournemouth North Cemetery and Bournemouth Crematorium is a municipal cemetery in Bournemouth, England. The cemetery is located between the suburbs of Charminster, Strouden Park and Queen's Park and is owned by Bournemouth, Christchurch and Poole Council.

The cemetery has 110 war grave burials from World War II, 75 of whom are buried in a section maintained by the Commonwealth War Graves Commission, with one burial unidentified and one Dutch war burial. In addition, the CWGC maintain a screen wall memorial to 35 Commonwealth service personnel who were cremated at Bournemouth Crematorium during the same war.

== Notable burials and cremations ==
- Captain Frederick Barter (1891–1952), World War I British Army VC recipient (cremated).
- Staff-Sergeant Joseph John Davies (1889–1976), World War I British Army VC recipient (cremated).
- Field Marshal Sir Cyril Deverell (1874–1947), World War I British Army commander and Chief of the Imperial General Staff 1936–37 (cremated).
- Captain Henry James Knight (1878–1953), Boer War British Army VC recipient (cremated).
- Sergeant Frederick McNess (1892–1958), World War I British Army VC recipient (cremated).
- Second-Lieutenant Alfred Oliver Pollard (1893–1960), World War I British Army VC recipient and author (cremated).
- Sergeant James Welch (1889–1978), World War I British Army VC recipient.
- McDonald Hobley (1917–1987), actor and broadcaster (cremated).

== Gallery ==
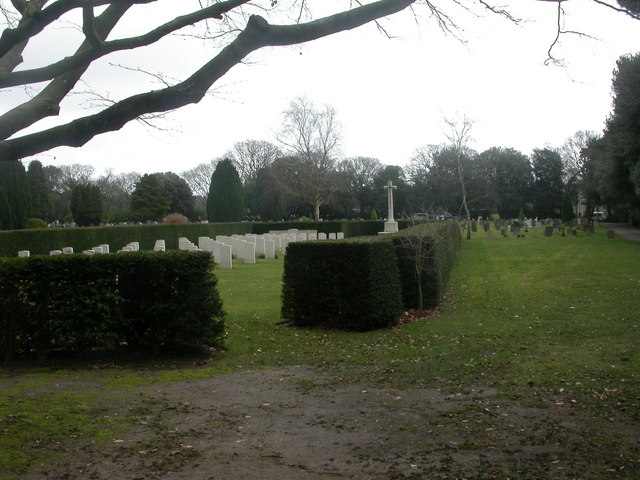
War graves section,

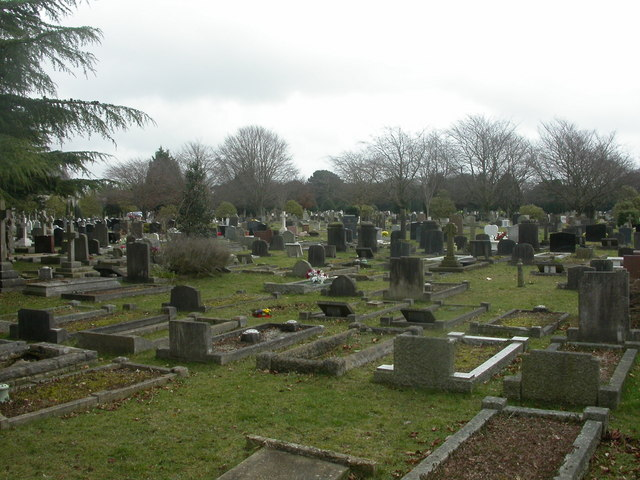
Gravestones dating from the 1940s.
