= Cyril Frisby =

British military officer (1885–1961)

Cyril Hubert Frisby
- Born: 17 September 1885; New Barnet, Hertfordshire
- Died: 10 September 1961 (aged 75); Guildford, Surrey
- Burial place: Brookwood Cemetery
- Military career
- Allegiance: United Kingdom
- Branch: British Army
- Rank: Captain
- Units: Hampshire Regiment; Coldstream Guards
- Conflicts: World War I
- Awards: Victoria Cross
- Other work: Sport fisherman

Cyril Hubert Frisby VC (17 September 1885 – 10 September 1961) was an English recipient of the Victoria Cross (VC), the highest and most prestigious award for gallantry in the face of the enemy that can be awarded to British and Commonwealth forces. Awarded the VC for his actions in the Battle of Canal du Nord during the First World War, in later life he was a prominent sports fisherman.

== Early life ==
Frisby was born on 17 September 1885 at New Barnet, Hertfordshire, the second son of Henry and Zoe Frisby. He was educated at Haileybury College. He became a member of the London Stock Exchange in 1911. The same year he married Audrey Ogilvie-Grant in London; the couple had a son, born two years later.

Frisby was a noted athlete for Polytechnic Harriers and finished second behind Swede Ernest Wilde in the 880 yards event at the 1913 AAA Championships. As the highest placed British athlete he was regarded as the National 880 yards champion.

== First World War ==
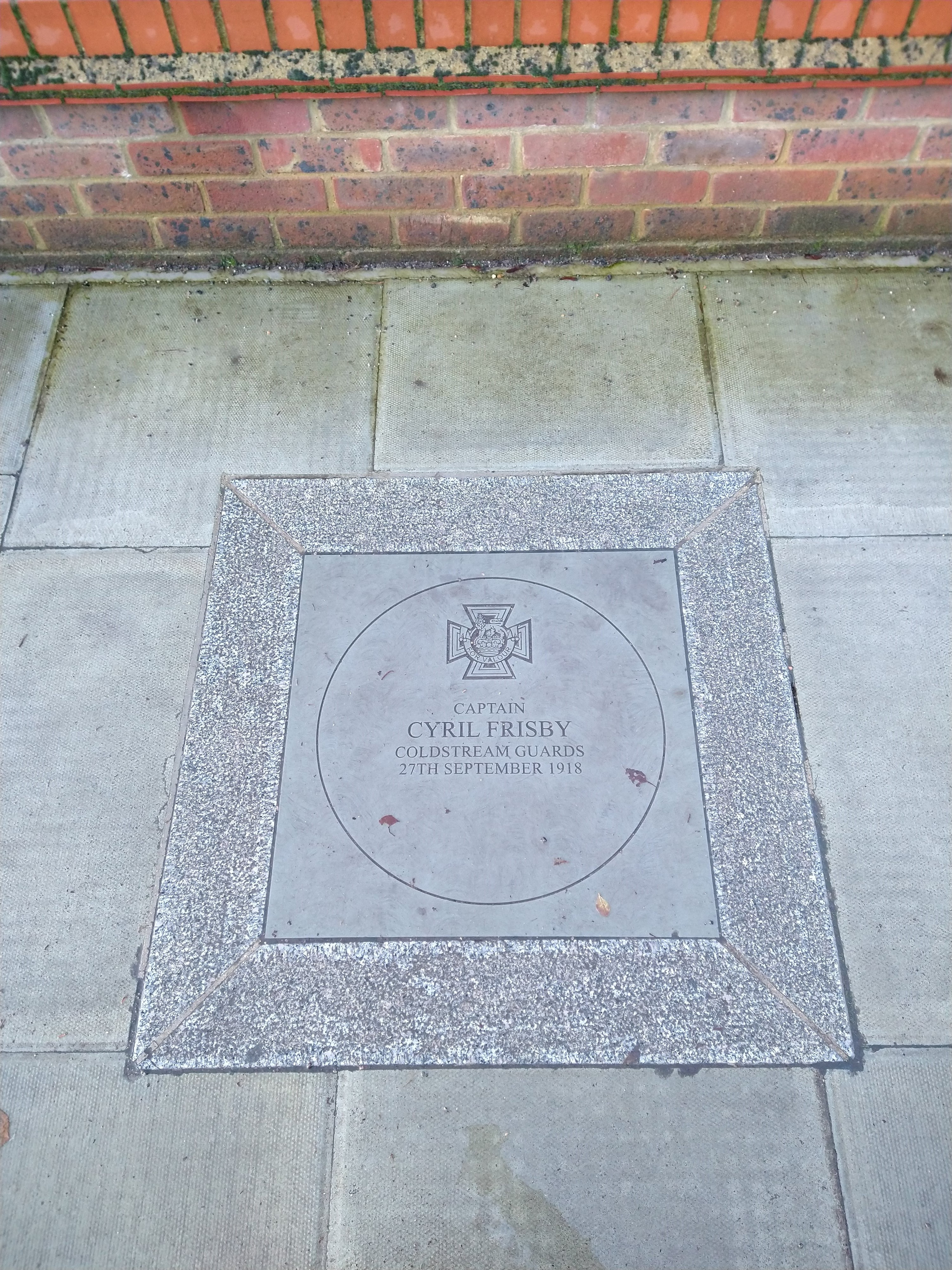
Memorial plaque to Cyril Frisby at Station Road, New Barnet.

Frisby joined the Hampshire Regiment as a private in October 1916 and within weeks was undergoing officer training. He was commissioned in the Coldstream Guards as a second lieutenant, with a seniority date of 28 March 1917. He was posted to the Western Front in November, where he joined the regiment's 1st Battalion. Early the following year, he was promoted to acting captain.

On 27 September 1918, during the Hundred Days Offensive, the Coldstream Guards was engaged in the Battle of Canal du Nord, near Graincourt. His battalion was tasked with the capture of a canal crossing, with Frisby himself in command of one of the attacking companies. Once over the canal, he was to set up defensive positions and make contact with the adjacent 3rd Guards Battalion. On reaching the canal, barbed wire, together with heavy fire from a German machine-gun post under the bridge on the far side of the canal halted the advance. Frisby, together with a lance-corporal, Thomas Jackson, and two others, got through the wire and climbed down into the canal under intense fire. With a further twelve men joining him, he led the capture of the post. Despite a leg wound, he then attended forming a defensive line as per his instructions. While doing so, he had led an adjacent leaderless company in fighting off a counter-attack.

For his actions, Frisby was awarded the Victoria Cross (VC), one of seven that were awarded for actions performed on 27 September. The citation for his VC read:

For conspicuous bravery, leadership and devotion to duty on 27 Sept. 1918, across the Canal Du Nord, near Graincourt, when in command of a company detailed to capture the canal crossing on the Demicourt-Graincourt road. On reaching the canal, the leading platoon came under annihilating machine-gun fire from a machine-gun post under the old iron bridge on the far side of the canal, and was unable to advance, despite reinforcing waves. Capt. Frisby realised at once that unless this post was captured the whole advance in this area would fail. Calling for volunteers to follow him, he dashed forward, and with three other ranks, he climbed down into the canal under an intense point-blank machine gun fire, and succeeded in capturing the post with two machine-guns and twelve men. By his personal valour and initiative he restored the situation and enabled the attacking companies to continue the advance. Having reached and consolidated his objective, he gave timely support to the company on his right, which had lost all its officers and sergeants, organised its defences, and beat off a heavy hostile counter-attack. He was wounded in the leg by a bayonet in the attack on the machine-gun post, but remained at duty throughout, thereby setting an excellent example to all ranks.

— The London Gazette, 26 November 1918

After the battle, the 1st Battalion was withdrawn to Boursies. Jackson, the lance corporal who had initially assisted Frisby that day, was later killed and posthumously awarded the VC. When Frisby was presented with his medal by King George V, in a ceremony at Buckingham Palace on 29 March 1919, Jackson's family was also there to receive his medal. Frisby was able to explain to them the circumstances of their relative's VC award. Frisby's brother Lionel also served in the First World War with the 6th Welsh Regiment as an acting lieutenant colonel; he was awarded the Distinguished Service Order.

== Later life ==
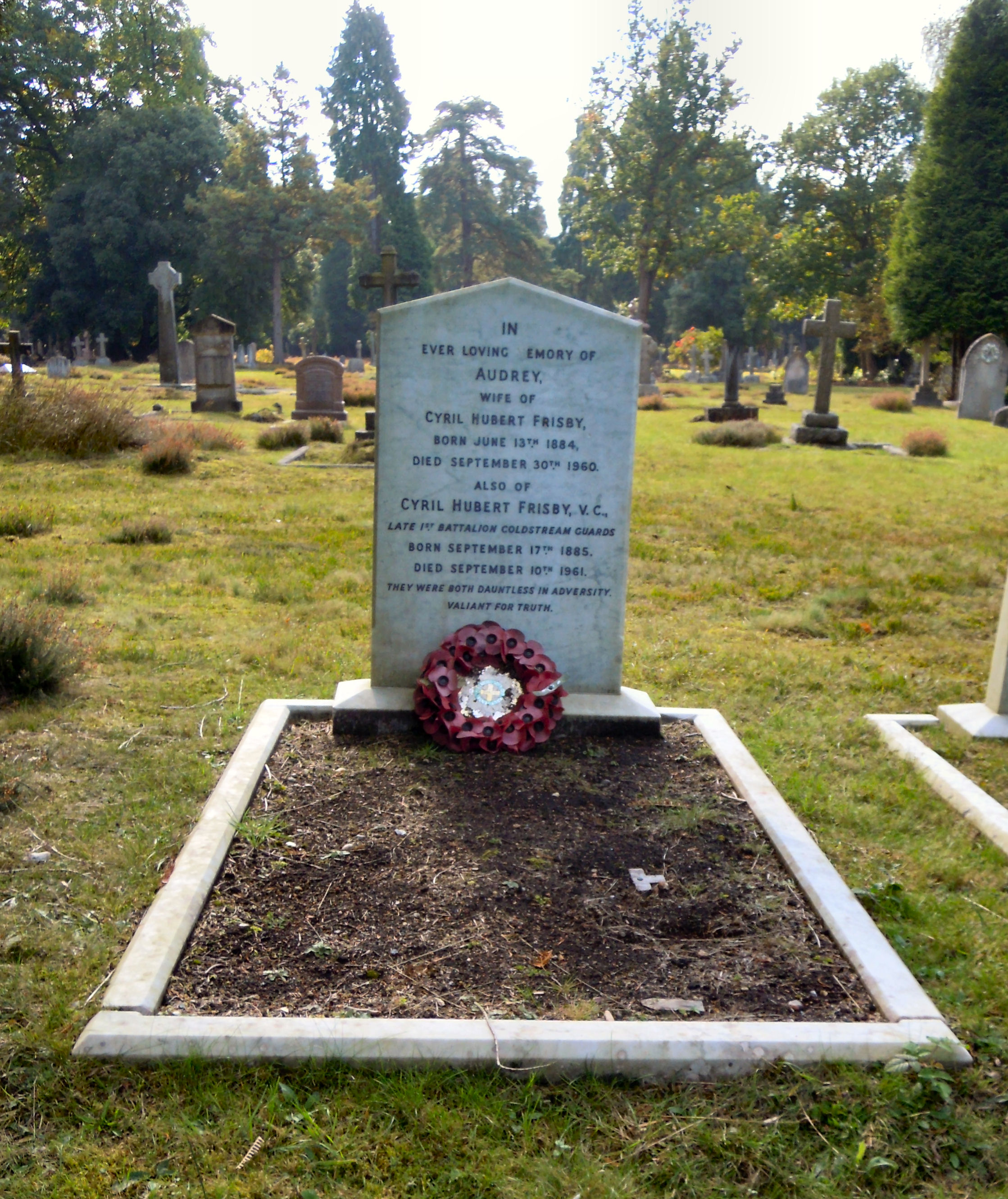
Frisby's grave in Brookwood Cemetery

After the war Frisby spent much of his time tuna fishing, becoming prominent in the sport and competing in international fishing competitions. In the 1930s, fishing off the coast of Scarborough, he caught a 659 pounds (299 kg) specimen. He also set a world record of 1.25 tons, for the greatest weight of fish caught in a day by an angler, ( The End of the Line (book), page 52). Also active in the British Legion, he became president of the Stoughton and Westborough branch in 1940, having previously served as its vice-president.

Frisby died on 10 September 1961 at his home in Guildford aged 75; his wife had predeceased him by almost a year. He and his wife are buried in Brookwood Cemetery (Plot 28) in Brookwood, Surrey. His son later donated Frisby's medals, which in addition to the VC included the British War Medal, the Victory Medal with Oak Leaf, the Defence Medal 1939–45, and Coronation Medals for 1937 and 1953, to the Coldstream Guards Museum, where they are on display at the regimental headquarters at Wellington Barracks in London.
