= Gordon Roberts (footballer) =

English footballer

Personal information
- Full name: Douglas Gordon Roberts
- Date of birth: 30 May 1925
- Place of birth: Foleshill, England
- Date of death: October 1991 (aged 66)
- Place of death: Northampton, England
- Height: 5 ft 8 in (1.73 m)
- Position: Outside forward

Youth career
- Wolverhampton Wanderers

Senior career*
Years	Team	Apps	(Gls)
1942–1945	Wolverhampton Wanderers	0	(0)
1945–1949	Northampton Town	57	(7)
1949–1951	Brighton & Hove Albion	17	(3)
1951–1952	Accrington Stanley	39	(11)
1952–195?	Rugby Town		
- Cheltenham Town
- * Club domestic league appearances and goals

Douglas Gordon Roberts (30 May 1925 – October 1991) was an English professional footballer who made 113 appearances in the Football League playing as an outside forward for Northampton Town, Brighton & Hove Albion and Accrington Stanley.

Roberts was born in Foleshill, Warwickshire, in 1925. He worked for many years as a draughtsman for British Timken at Duston, Northamptonshire. He died in Northampton in 1991 at the age of 66.
