= Fred McNess =

- Frederick McNess as depicted on a cigarette card
- Born: 22 January 1892; Bramley, West Yorkshire, England
- Died: 4 May 1956 (aged 64); Boscombe, Dorset, England
- Burial place: Bournemouth Crematorium
- Military career
- Allegiance: United Kingdom
- Branch: British Army
- Rank: Sergeant
- Units: Scots Guards
- Conflicts: World War I – First Battle of the Somme
- Awards: Victoria Cross

Fred McNess VC (22 January 1892 – 4 May 1956) was an English-born Scottish recipient of the Victoria Cross (VC), the highest and most prestigious award for gallantry in the face of the enemy that can be awarded to British and Commonwealth forces.

McNess was 24 years old, and a lance-sergeant in the 1st Battalion, Scots Guards, British Army during the First World War when the following deed took place for which he was awarded the VC.

On 15 September 1916 near Ginchy, France, during a period of severe fighting, Lance-Sergeant McNess led his men with great dash in the face of heavy shell and machine-gun fire. When the first line of the enemy trenches was reached, it was found that the left flank was exposed and that the enemy were bombing down the trench. McNess then organised and led a counter-attack and, although he was very severely wounded in the neck and jaw, did not give up. Finally he established a "block" and continued encouraging his men and throwing bombs until exhausted by loss of blood.

He later achieved the rank of sergeant. The severe nature of his wounds left Ness in lifelong pain which eventually led him to take his own life. His Victoria Cross is displayed at The Guards Regimental Headquarters (Scots Guards RHQ), Wellington Barracks in London.

== Bibliography ==
- Gliddon, Gerald (2011) [1991]. Somme 1916. VCs of the First World War. The History Press. ISBN 978-0-7524-6303-2.
- Whitworth, Alan (2012). Yorkshire VCs. Pen and Sword Books. ISBN 978-1-84884-778-1.
