= Thomas Norman Jackson =

English posthumous recipient of the Victoria Cross

Thomas Norman Jackson VC
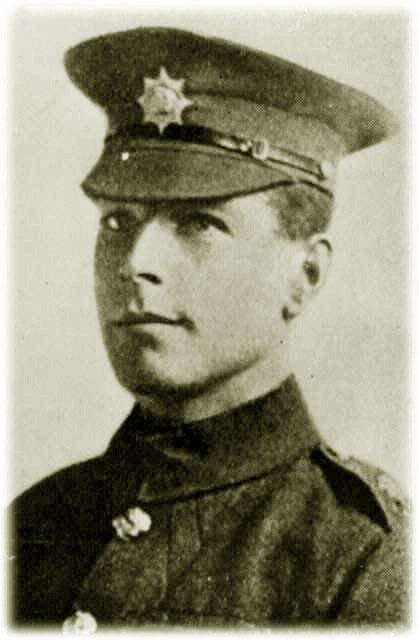
- Born: 11 February 1897; Swinton, West Riding of Yorkshire, England
- Died: 27 September 1918 (aged 21) †; Canal du Nord, France
- Burial place: Sanders Keep Military Cemetery, Graincourt-les-Havrincourt
- Military career
- Allegiance: United Kingdom
- Branch: British Army
- Service years: 1915–1918
- Rank: Lance Corporal
- Service number: 20810
- Unit: Coldstream Guards
- Conflicts: World War I: Battle of Cambrai; Hundred Days Offensive; Battle of the Canal du Nord †
- Awards: Victoria Cross

Lance Corporal Thomas Norman Jackson VC (11 February 1897 – 27 September 1918) was a British Army soldier and an English posthumous recipient of the Victoria Cross (VC), the highest military award for gallantry in the face of the enemy given to British and Commonwealth forces, during the First World War.

== Early life ==
Thomas Norman Jackson was born on 11 February 1897 in Swinton in the then West Riding of Yorkshire to Thomas Edwin Jackson, a worker at a supplier of mineral water, and Emma Jackson. After completing his schooling, he started working alongside his father. He later took up employment at the Great Central Locomotive Depot, based at Mexborough.

== First World War ==
In November 1915, Jackson enlisted in the British Army and, in October 1917, was posted to the 1st Battalion of the Coldstream Guards, which was serving in France on the Western Front at the time. He participated in the Battle of Cambrai the following month. He was later promoted to lance corporal.

On 27 September 1918, during the Hundred Days Offensive, the Coldstream Guards was engaged in the Battle of Canal du Nord, near Graincourt. Jackson's battalion was tasked with the capture of a canal crossing. Once over the canal, it was to set up defensive positions and make contact with the adjacent 3rd Guards Battalion. On reaching the canal, the advance of Jackson's company, under the command of Captain Cyril Frisby, was halted by barbed wire together with heavy fire from a German machine-gun post under the bridge on the far side of the canal. Jackson, together with Frisby and two others, got through the wire and climbed down into the canal under intense fire. With a further twelve men joining them, the post was captured.

Later in the morning, Jackson was ordered to move forward with a platoon to seize a German-held trench. He was first into the trench, and after killing two German soldiers, he in turn was killed. His grave is at Sanders Keep Military Cemetery, Graincourt-les-Havrincourt, which is to the west of Cambrai.

For his actions on 27 September 1918, Jackson was awarded the Victoria Cross (VC), one of seven that would be awarded for actions performed on 27 September. The citation for his VC reads:

For most conspicuous bravery and self-sacrifice in the attack across the Canal Du Nord, near Graincourt. On the morning of the 27th September, 1918, L./Cpl. Jackson was the first to volunteer to follow Capt. C. H. Frisby, Coldstream Guards, across the Canal du Nord in his rush against an enemy machine-gun post. With two comrades he followed his officer across the Canal, rushed the post, captured the two machine-guns, and so enabled the companies to advance. Later in the morning, L./Cpl. Jackson was the first to jump into a German trench which his platoon had to clear, and after doing further excellent work he was unfortunately killed. Throughout the whole day until he was killed this young N.C.O. showed the greatest valour and devotion to duty and set an inspiring example to all.

— London Gazette, 27 November 1918

King George V presented Jackson's VC to his parents in a ceremony at Buckingham Palace on 29 March 1919. Also present was Jackson's fiancée Daisy Flatt. Captain Frisby, in attendance at the same ceremony to receive his own award of the VC for his role in the action of 27 September 1918, was able to explain to Jackson's family the circumstances of their relative's VC award. A few months later Frisby travelled to Swindon to unveil a painting commemorating Jackson.

== Medals ==
In June 1969, Jackson's brother donated his medals, which in addition to the VC also included the British War Medal and Victory Medal to The Coldstream Guards Regimental Headquarters at Wellington Barracks in London, where they are on display.

== Bibliography ==
- Gliddon, Gerald (2014) [2000]. The Final Days 1918. VCs of the First World War. Stroud, Gloucestershire: The History Press. ISBN 978-0-7509-5368-9.
