= John McAulay =

Scottish policeman, soldier and recipient of the Victoria Cross

- Sergeant John McAulay of the Glasgow Police, c.1922
- Born: 27 December 1888; Kinghorn, Fife
- Died: 14 January 1956 (aged 67); Burnside, Glasgow
- Burial place: New Eastwood Cemetery, Glasgow
- Military career
- Allegiance: United Kingdom
- Branch: British Army
- Service years: 1914–1919
- Rank: Sergeant
- Service number: No. 10053
- Units: Scots Guards
- Conflicts: First World War
- Awards: Victoria Cross; Distinguished Conduct Medal
- Other work: Police inspector

Sergeant John McAulay, VC, DCM (27 December 1888 – 14 January 1956) was a Scottish policeman, soldier and recipient of the Victoria Cross, the highest award for gallantry in the face of the enemy that can be awarded to British and Commonwealth forces.

== Early life ==
He was born in Kinghorn in Fife on 27 December 1888 the son of John McAulay and his wife Isabella. The family moved to 4 Gillespie Crescent in Plean (near Falkirk) and he was educated at Plean Primary School. He left school around 1901 and began working as a coal-miner. Being both tall and strong he left the pits to join the police force in 1911 and was based in Glasgow. At the onset of the First World War he was one of the first volunteers and joined the Scots Guards on 9 September 1914.

== Details ==
He was 28 years old, and a sergeant in the 1st Battalion, Scots Guards, British Army during the First World War when the following deed took place at the Battle of Cambrai for which he was awarded the VC.

For most conspicuous bravery and initiative in attack. When all his officers had become casualties Serjt. McAulay assumed command of the company and under shell and machine-gun fire successfully held and consolidated the objective gained. He reorganised the company, cheered on and encouraged his men, and under heavy fire at close quarters showed utter disregard of danger.

Noticing a counter-attack developing on his exposed left flank, he successfully repulsed it by the skilful and bold use of machine-guns, aided by two men only, causing heavy enemy casualties.

Serjt. McAulay also carried his company commander, who was mortally wounded, a long distance to a place of safety under very heavy fire. Twice he was knocked down by the concussion of a bursting shell but, nothing daunted, he continued on his way until his objective was achieved, killing two of the enemy who endeavoured to intercept him.

Throughout the day this very gallant Non-commissioned Officer displayed the highest courage, tactical skill, and coolness under exceptionally trying circumstances.

After the war he resumed his career in the Glasgow Police, serving in the Maryhill district, rising to the rank of inspector before retiring in 1948.

He died at the age of 67 at home, 915 Aikenhead Road, Burnside, Glasgow on 14 January 1956 and is buried in New Eastwood Cemetery in Glasgow (section L-VII lair 139.

== Family ==
He was married to Catherine Thomson (1890-1963). Before to this, he was first married to Isabella Horn or Chitticks on 22 April 1919. Isabella (or Bella) died in childbirth on 27 December 1920. Their child John died three days later

== Freemasonry ==
He was initiated into Freemasonry in Lodge Greyfriars No.1221, (Glasgow, Scotland) on 13 May 1924.

== Medal ==
His Victoria Cross is displayed at The Guards Regimental Headquarters (Scots Guards RHQ), London.

== Bibliography ==
- Gliddon, Gerald (2004) [2012]. VCs of the First World War: Cambrai 1917. The History Press. ISBN 978-0-75-247668-1.
