= Thomas Woodcock (VC) =

English Victoria Cross recipient (1888–1918)

- Born: 19 March 1888; Wigan, Lancashire
- Died: 27 March 1918 (aged 30); Bullecourt, France
- Burial place: Douchy-les-Ayette British Cemetery
- Military career
- Allegiance: United Kingdom
- Branch: British Army
- Service years: 1915 – 1918
- Rank: Lance Corporal
- Units: Irish Guards
- Conflicts: World War I
- Awards: Victoria Cross

Thomas Woodcock VC (19 March 1888 – 27 March 1918) was an English recipient of the Victoria Cross, the highest medal that can be awarded to British and Commonwealth forces.

== Details ==
Woodcock was 29 years old, and a private in the 2nd Battalion, Irish Guards, British Army during the First World War when the following deed took place for which he was awarded the VC.

On 12/13 September 1917 north of Broenbeek, Belgium, when an advanced post had held out for 96 hours and was finally forced to retire, the lance-sergeant (John Moyney) in charge of the party and Private Woodcock covered the retirement. After crossing the stream themselves, Private Woodcock heard cries for help behind him - he returned and waded into the stream amid a shower of bombs and rescued another member of the party whom he carried across open ground in daylight towards our front line, regardless of machine-gun fire.

He was killed in action at Bullecourt, France, on 27 March 1918.

== Further information ==
He later achieved the rank of corporal. He is buried at Douchy-les-Ayette British Cemetery, France. 8m SW of Arras. Plot IV. row F. Grave 3.

His Victoria Cross is held by the Irish Guards and is on display at the Guards Museum, Birdcage Walk, London.

== Bibliography ==
- Snelling, Stephen (2012) [1998]. Passchendaele 1917. VCs of the First World War. The History Press. ISBN 978-0752476667.
