= Battle of the Canal du Nord =

1918 battle of World War I

Coordinates: 50°17′N 3°07′E

Battle of Canal du Nord
- Part of the Hundred Days Offensive of the First World War
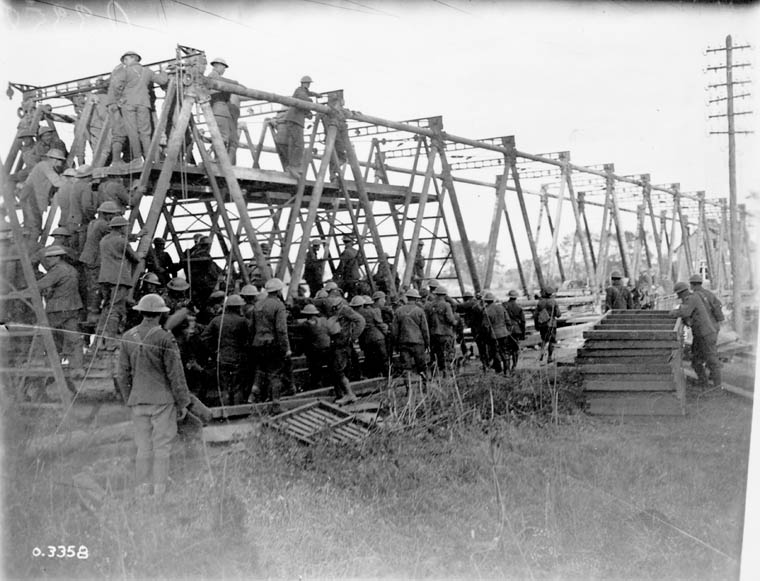
- Canadian engineers building a bridge across the Canal du Nord, September 1918
| Date | September 27 - October 1, 1918 |
| Location | Canal du Nord |
| Result | Allied victory |

Belligerents
| United Kingdom: Canada; New Zealand | German Empire |

Commanders and leaders
| (United Kingdom of Great Britain and Ireland) Henry Horne (United Kingdom of Great Britain and Ireland) Julian Byng | (German Empire) Otto von Below (German Empire) Georg von der Marwitz |

Strength
| 13 divisions | |

Casualties and losses
| 30,000 | 36,500 POW; 380 guns |

The Battle of Canal du Nord was part of the Hundred Days Offensive of the First World War by the Allies against German positions on the Western Front. The battle took place in the Nord-Pas-de-Calais region of France, along an incomplete portion of the Canal du Nord and on the outskirts of Cambrai between 27 September and 1 October 1918. To prevent the Germans from sending reinforcements against one attack, the assault along the Canal du Nord was part of a sequence of Allied attacks all along the Western Front. The attack began the day after the Meuse-Argonne Offensive commenced, a day before an offensive in Belgian Flanders and two days before the Battle of St. Quentin Canal.

The attack took place along the boundary between the British First Army and Third Army, which were to continue the advance started with the Battle of the Drocourt-Quéant Line, Battle of Havrincourt and Battle of Epehy. The First Army was to lead the crossing of the Canal du Nord and secure the northern flank of the British Third Army as both armies advanced towards Cambrai. The Third Army was also to capture the Escaut (Scheldt) Canal, to support the Fourth Army during the Battle of St. Quentin Canal.

== Background ==
Construction of the Canal du Nord began in 1913 to link the Oise River to the Dunkirk–Scheldt Canal. When the First World War began, work stopped with the canal in varying stages of completion. During their retreat, the Germans made the area along the canal north of Sains-lès-Marquion virtually impassable by destroying bridges and flooding the already swampy ground surrounding the canal. The only passable ground was to the south, where a small 4,000 yd (2.3 mi; 3.7 km) section of the canal between Sains-lès-Marquion and Mœuvres remained largely dry, on account of its incomplete state. Even in a partially excavated state, the dry section of the canal was still a serious obstacle. The canal was approximately 40 yd (37 m) wide, with a western bank that was between 10 and 15 ft (3.0 and 4.6 m) high and an eastern bank about 5 ft (1.5 m) high. The British First Army (General Henry Horne) was forced to stop its offensive until a route was secured across the canal.

The British assault on the Drocourt-Quéant Line on 2 September 1918 resulted in the Germans being overrun along a 7,000 yd (4.0 mi; 6.4 km) front. Several formations in the German forward line quickly yielded to the British advance but then the British met more resolute opposition from regiments of the German 1st Guards Reserve Division, 2nd Guards Reserve Division and the 3rd Reserve Division. To gain observation of all bridges over the Sensée River and the Canal du Nord, the British attack was supposed to continue the following day but the Germans forestalled the British by withdrawing along a wide front.

Oberste Heeresleitung (OHL, the German army high command) had ordered the 17th Army to retreat behind the Sensée River and the Canal du Nord on the night of 2 September and the 2nd Army to withdraw to the Hindenburg Line the following night. Further to the south, the 18th and 9th Armies were to follow in succession, resulting in the abandonment of the salient gained during the Spring Offensive by 9 September. In the north the 4th and 6th Armies retreated between Lens and Ypres, abandoning the Lys salient and the gains made during the Battle of the Lys.

British air patrols on the morning of 3 September reported seeing no Germans between the Dury Ridge and the Canal du Nord. The Third Army was able to occupy the towns of Quéant and Pronville unopposed and saw that the Germans were withdrawing on a wide front. As the British advanced to the new German front line they reported that the east bank of the Canal du Nord was strongly held and that the canal crossings had been destroyed except at Palluel, where the Germans held a bridgehead on the western side of the canal.

== Tactical plan and preparations ==
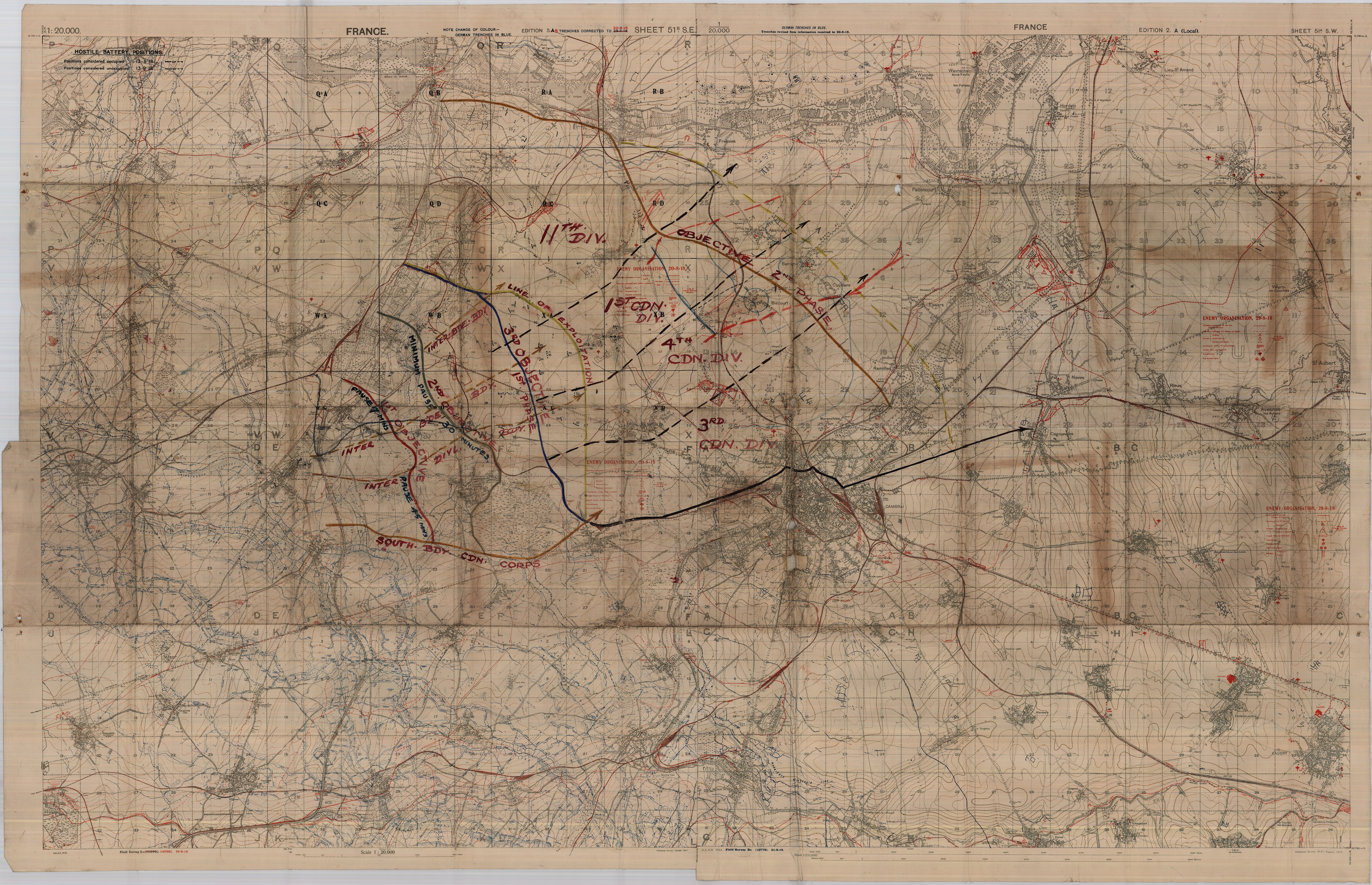
Battle planning map detailing the brigade boundaries and objectives of the Canadian Corps.

On 3 September Supreme Commander of the Allied Armies Généralissime Ferdinand Foch outlined the future course of the Allied offensive campaign along the Western Front. To avoid the risk of having extensive German reserves massed against a single Allied attack, Foch devised a plan for a general offensive between Verdun and the Belgian coast. The plan called for Allied attacks at four separate points in the German line, to be launched on four successive days. Army Group Flanders under King Albert I of Belgium would conduct the most northern operation and attack German positions in Flanders and move towards Ghent and Bruges. The British First and Third Armies would attack and cross the Canal du Nord, move across the northern extension of the Hindenburg Line and capture the city of Cambrai, a crucial German communications and supply centre. The British Fourth Army and French First Army would attack the Germans along the Saint-Quentin Canal in an effort to breach the Hindenburg Line between Holnon and Vendhuile. To the south, the First United States Army and French Fourth Army would mount the Meuse-Argonne Offensive between Reims and Verdun, moving along the Meuse River and through the Argonne Forest.

The Canal du Nord defensive system was the Germans' last major prepared defensive position opposite the British First Army. It was a significant obstacle as the Germans had taken measures to incorporate the unfinished canal into their defensive system. Beyond the damage done to make crossing the canal as difficult as possible, north of Mœuvres a lesser arm of the Hindenburg Support Line, the Canal du Nord Line, ran directly behind the east side of the canal. The greater arm of the Hindenburg Support Line crossed the canal at Mœuvres and thus remained well established on the eastern side of the canal south of Mœuvres. This was supplemented by the Marquion-Cantaing Line which ran along a north–south axis one mile east of the canal and the Marcoing Line located just west of Cambrai. The attack on the Canal du Nord was to begin on 27 September 1918, a day after the Meuse-Argonne Offensive, one day before the offensive in Flanders and two days before the Battle of St. Quentin Canal.

The British First Army was operating in a framework whereby its main task was to secure the northern flank of the British Third Army. The British Third Army was tasked with securing the Escaut (Scheldt) Canal so as to be in a position to support the British Fourth Army during the Battle of St. Quentin Canal. On the British First Army front, the Canadian Corps would lead the attack under the direction of Arthur Currie, crossing the largely dry canal on a front of only 2,700 yards (2,500 m) between Sains-lès-Marquion and Mœuvres. This narrow frontage was necessitated by the fact that the Germans had deliberately flooded most of the front opposite the Canadians, creating a bog. Once over the canal the corps was to capture the Marquion Line, the villages of Marquion and Bourlon, Bourlon Wood and lastly secure a general line running from Fontaine-Notre-Dame to Sauchy-Lestrée. Currie separated the Canadian Corps' objectives into two phases; the first to take Canal du Nord and Bourlon Wood, the second taking the bridges at Canal de l'Escaut and "high ground near Cambrai". Currie's immediate superior Horne saw the unconventional Canadian plan of attacking on an initially narrow front, then fanning outwards in a highly complicated maneuver as dangerously risky. When Currie refused to change his plan, Horne appealed to Currie's former superior Byng and to British Expeditionary Force commander Douglas Haig, but Haig declined to overrule Currie.

In an attempt to make the Germans second guess or question the location of the main assault, XXII Corps was instructed to engage German positions along the Canal du Nord between Sauchy-Lestrée and Palluel. Likewise, VII Corps and the remainder of XXII Corps were instructed to carry out minor attacks north of the Scarpe River to prevent the Germans from moving units from that area to the location of the main attack. If the Canadian Corps was successful in its advance the intention was to immediately and quickly exploit the territorial gain with the support of the British Third Army's XVII, VI and IV Corps.

== Battle ==
Over the next week, Currie and Byng prepared for the engagement. Two divisions were sent south, to cross the canal at a weaker point, while Canadian combat engineers worked to construct wooden bridges for the attack. In the narrow, 2,700-yard-wide (2,500 m) dry corridor selected for the assault, the Canadians would launch their initial attack with just four battalions and a total of 2,100 troops. Afterwards, troops from three Canadian divisions and a British division would pass through this narrow corridor and fan out to advance outwards in multiple directions. Even though the canal was largely dry, the need to speedily bring these troops, plus artillery and supplies, across meant that the engineer units within the Canadian Corps (which were several times larger than equivalent British units) had to rapidly place the bridges across the canal.

At 5:20 on the morning of 27 September, the four leading Canadian battalions attacked under total darkness. Although the Germans were aware that an operation was impending, the German defenders of the 1st Prussian Guards Reserve Division and the 3rd German Naval Division were still taken by surprise. This surprise may have been crucial, as Currie expressed concern that if the Germans learned his troops were massing to attack, they could have bombarded that narrow sector and seriously affected or prevented the success of the operation.

The Canadian Corps had the important objective of capturing Bourlon Wood; the German army used the high ground of the woods for their guns. The objectives of the Canadian Corps were reached by the end of the day, including the Red, Green and Blue lines. The Canadians advanced nearly eight kilometres on the first day of the battle.

Over the next few days, the Germans reinforced the four divisions originally facing the Canadians with troops from six more divisions, and another three divisions reinforced those facing the British. While this reduced the Germans' ability to send reserves to other sectors threatened by Allied attacks, German resistance in the Cambrai sector stiffened, slowing the advance. Still, by October 1, all the objectives designated by Currie had been captured. Canadian and British forces had taken ground around multiple sides of Cambrai, and overrun the primary defence lines around the city.

== Aftermath ==
The battle penetrated a majority of the defenses of the Hindenburg Line and allowed the next attack (the Battle of Cambrai (1918)) to complete the penetration and begin the advance beyond the Hindenburg Line. Indeed, the loss of Cambrai and the Canal du Nord made the German position on the rest of the Hindenburg Line untenable, as did other engagements like the breaching of the Hindenburg Line in the Battle of St Quentin Canal. This led the German high command to accept that they could not win the war.

Twelve Victoria Crosses, the highest military decoration for valour awarded to British and Commonwealth forces, were awarded for actions during the battle, with 8 surviving the war;

- Acting Lieutenant-Colonel John Vereker, 6th Viscount Gort of the 1st Battalion, Grenadier Guards.
- Captain John MacGregor, 2nd Battalion, Canadian Mounted Rifles.
- Captain Cyril Hubert Frisby, 1st Battalion, Coldstream Guards.
- Lieutenant Graham Thomson Lyall, 102nd (North British Columbia) Battalion, CEF.
- Lieutenant Samuel Lewis Honey, 78th Battalion (Winnipeg Grenadiers), CEF. KIA
- Lieutenant George Fraser Kerr, 3rd Battalion (Toronto Regiment), CEF.
- Lieutenant Milton Fowler Gregg, Royal Canadian Regiment.
- Sergeant William Merrifield, 4th (Central Ontario) Battalion, CEF.
- Sergeant Frederick Charles Riggs, 6th Battalion, York and Lancaster Regiment. KIA
- Corporal Thomas Neely, 8th Battalion, The King's Own Royal Regiment (Lancaster). KIA
- Lance-Corporal Thomas Norman Jackson, 1st Battalion, Coldstream Guards. KIA
- Private Henry Tandey, 5th Battalion, Duke of Wellington's Regiment (West Riding).

== Commemoration ==
The Canadian participation in the Battle of the Canal du Nord is commemorated at the Canadian Bourlon Wood Memorial, located southeast of the town of Bourlon. The memorial is on high ground beside the Bourlon Woods, giving a view of the town.
