= Richard Nugent =

Richard Nugent may refer to:

- Richard Nugent, 1st Earl of Westmeath (1583–1642), Irish nobleman and politician
- Richard Nugent, 2nd Earl of Westmeath (died 1684), Irish nobleman
- Richard Nugent, 3rd Earl of Westmeath (died 1714), Irish peer and Roman Catholic monk
- Richard Nugent, Lord Delvin (1742–1761), Irish duellist and Member of Parliament
- Richard Nugent (newspaperman) (1815–1858), Canadian newspaperman
- Richard E. Nugent (1902–1979), United States Air Force general during World War II
- Richard Bruce Nugent (1906–1987), American writer, painter and important figure in the Harlem Renaissance
- Richard Nugent, Baron Nugent of Guildford (1907–1994), British politician
- Richard Aherne (1911–2002), Irish actor sometimes credited as Richard Nugent
- Rich Nugent (born 1951), United States Representative from Florida's 11th Congressional District
- Richard Nugent, the bachelor character (played by Cary Grant) in 1947 comedy film The Bachelor and the Bobby-Soxer

== See also ==
- Dick Nugent (1931–2018), American golf course designer and architect
