= Anthony Nugent =

Anthony Nugent may refer to:

- Anthony Nugent, 4th Baron Nugent of Riverston (1730–1814), Irish peer
- Anthony Francis Nugent, 9th Earl of Westmeath (1805–1879), Irish peer
- Anthony Nugent, 11th Earl of Westmeath (1870–1933), Irish peer
