= Thomas Nugent =

Thomas Nugent may refer to:

- Thomas Nugent, 1st Baron Nugent of Riverston (died 1715), Irish Roman Catholic barrister
- Thomas Nugent, 4th Earl of Westmeath (1669–1752), Irish soldier and peer
- Thomas Nugent (travel writer) (c. 1700–1772), Anglo-Irish gentleman travel writer
- Thomas Nugent, 6th Earl of Westmeath (1714–1792), Irish peer and freemason
- Tom Nugent (1913–2006), American football coach
- Tom Nugent (physicist), American physicist
- Tom Nugent (cricketer) (born 1994), English cricketer
