= William Thomas Nugent, 5th Baron Nugent of Riverston =

Irish noble (1773–1851)

William Thomas Nugent, 5th Baron Nugent of Riverston (29 September 1773 – 6 September 1851).

A descendant of Richard Nugent, 2nd Earl of Westmeath (died 1641) and a son of Anthony Nugent, 4th Baron Nugent of Riverston (1730-1814), Nugent styled himself 5th Baron Nugent of Riverston upon his father's death in 1814. In July 1839 he claimed the title but the House of Lords Privileges Committee adjourned the issue, declaring it sine die. However, his eldest son, Anthony (1805–79) went on to become the 9th Earl of Westmeath, inheriting it from his kinsman, George Nugent, 1st Marquess of Westmeath.

Nugent married Catherine Bellew of Mount Bellew, County Galway, and had issue:

- Jane Olivia Nugent (died 27 Dec 1842), married Lt.Colonel James FitzGerald Kenny
- Anthony Francis Nugent, 6th Baron Nugent of Riverston (1 Nov 1805 – 12 May 1879)
- Michael William Bellew Nugent (born 28 Aug 1808) of Earl's Park, County Galway, married Emily Morrall on 29 February 1852.

Peerage of Ireland
Preceded by Anthony Nugent	— TITULAR — Baron Nugent of Riverston; Jacobite peerage 1814–1851	Succeeded by Anthony Francis Nugent
