= Christopher Nugent, Lord Delvin =

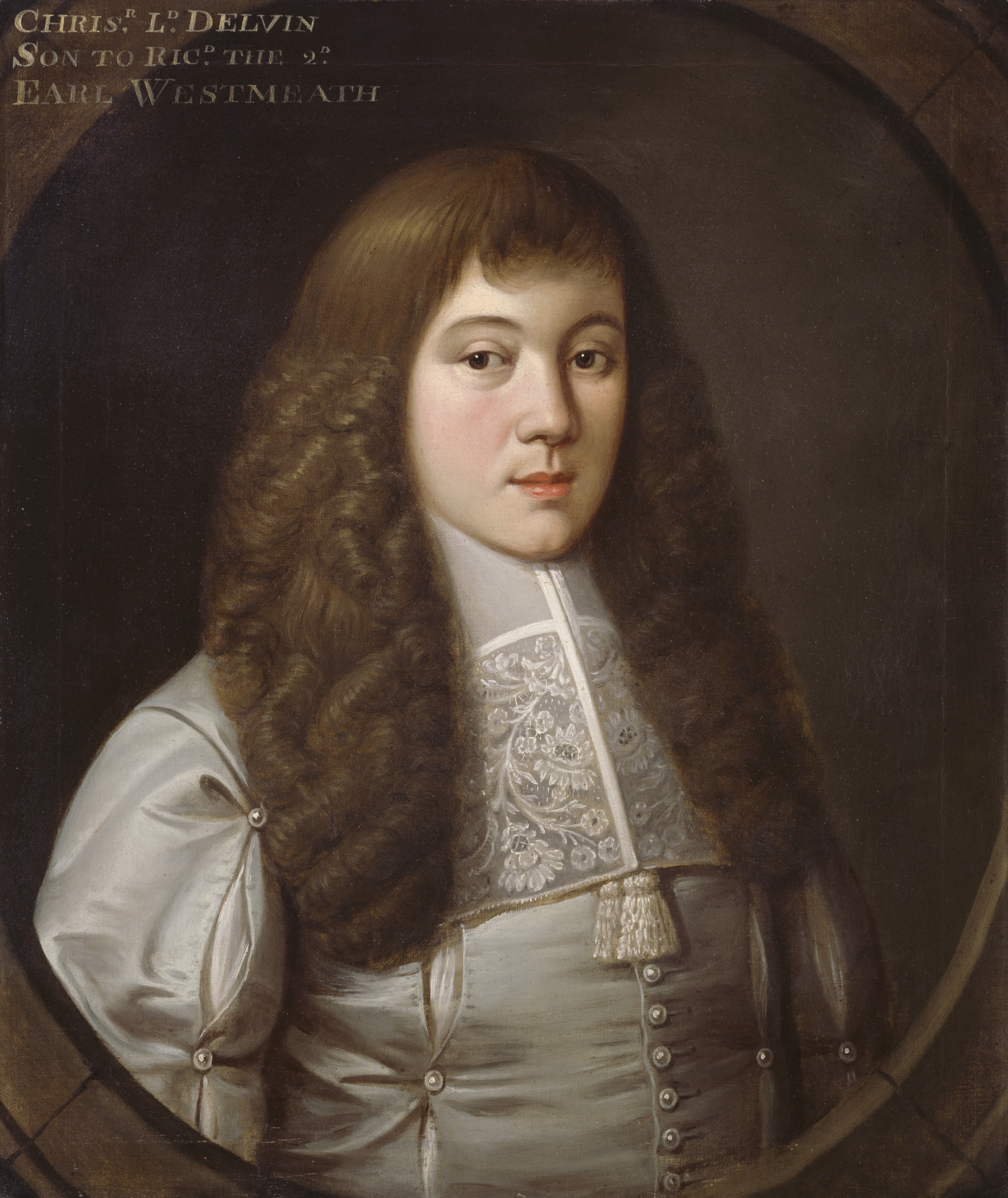
Portrait by Gaspar Smitz, c. 1660–1665

Christopher Nugent, Lord Delvin (died before 1680) was the eldest son of Richard Nugent, 2nd Earl of Westmeath and his wife and cousin Mary Nugent, daughter of Sir Thomas Nugent and widow of Christopher Plunkett. His brother was Thomas Nugent, 1st Baron Nugent of Riverston.

By his wife, Mary Butler (daughter of Colonel Richard Butler, grandson of Walter Butler, 11th Earl of Ormonde and Lady Frances Tuchet, daughter of Mervyn Tuchet, 2nd Earl of Castlehaven), he had issue:

- Richard Nugent, 3rd Earl of Westmeath, c.1669 – Apr 1714
- Thomas Nugent, 4th Earl of Westmeath, c.1669-30 Jun 1752
- John Nugent, 5th Earl of Westmeath, 1671-3 Jul 1754
