= Earl of Westmeath =

Extinct title in the peerage of Ireland

Earldom of Westmeath
- Arms: Ermine, two Bars Gules. Crest: A Cockatrice, wings elevated, tail nowed Vert, combed and wattled Gules. Supporters: On either side a Cockatrice, wings elevated and addorsed, tail nowed Vert, combed and wattled Gules.
- Creation date: 4 September 1621
- Creation: First
- Created by: James VI and I
- Peerage: Peerage of Ireland
- First holder: Richard Nugent, 7th Baron Delvin
- Present holder: Sean Charles Weston Nugent, 14th Earl of Westmeath
- Heir presumptive: Patrick Mark Leonard Nugent
- Remainder to: the 1st Earl’s heirs male forever
- Subsidiary titles: Baron Delvin
- Status: Extant
- Motto: DECREVI (I have resolved)

Earl of Westmeath is a title in the Peerage of Ireland. It was created in 1621 for Richard Nugent, Baron Delvin. During the Tudor era the loyalty of the Nugent family was often in question, and Richard's father, the sixth Baron, died in prison while awaiting trial for treason, a crime for which other members of the family had already been condemned. Richard himself when young was suspected of plotting rebellion and was imprisoned, but in later life, he was a staunch supporter of the Crown, which rewarded him richly for his loyalty.

The fifth Earl was a Major-General in the British Army. The sixth Earl was sworn of the Irish Privy Council in 1758. His son by his first wife, Richard Nugent, Lord Delvin, was killed in a duel at an early age. Lord Westmeath was succeeded by his second son by his second wife, the seventh Earl. He sat in the House of Lords as one of the original 28 Irish representative peers; he was also involved in a much-publicised divorce following an action for criminal conversation against his wife and her lover. He was succeeded by his son, the eighth Earl. He was created Marquess of Westmeath in the Peerage of Ireland in 1822. He had no surviving male issue and the marquessate became extinct on his death in 1871. He was succeeded in the barony and earldom by his fourth cousin, Anthony Francis Nugent, the ninth Earl, who was a claimant to the Jacobite title Baron Nugent of Riverston. The eleventh Earl was an Irish Representative Peer from 1901 to 1933.

== Barons Delvin (c. 1389/1486) ==
- William Fitzrichard Nugent, 1st Baron Delvin (died c. 1414)
- Richard Nugent, 2nd Baron Delvin (died 1475)
- Christopher Nugent, 3rd Baron Delvin (died c. 1483)
- Richard Nugent, 4th Baron Delvin (died 1537)
- Richard Nugent, 5th Baron Delvin (1523–1559)
- Christopher Nugent, 6th Baron Delvin (1544–1602)
- Richard Nugent, 7th Baron Delvin (1583–1642) (created Earl of Westmeath in 1621)

== Earls of Westmeath (1621) ==
- Richard Nugent, 1st Earl of Westmeath (1583–1642)
- Richard Nugent, 2nd Earl of Westmeath (1621–1684)
- Richard Nugent, 3rd Earl of Westmeath (died 1714)
- Thomas Nugent, 4th Earl of Westmeath (1669–1752)
- John Nugent, 5th Earl of Westmeath (1671–1754)
- Thomas Nugent, 6th Earl of Westmeath (1714–1792)
- George Frederick Nugent, 7th Earl of Westmeath (1760–1814)
- George Thomas John Nugent, 8th Earl of Westmeath (1785–1871) (created Marquess of Westmeath in 1822)

== Marquesses of Westmeath (1822) ==
- George Thomas John Nugent, 1st Marquess of Westmeath (1785–1871)

== Earls of Westmeath (1621; Reverted) ==
- Anthony Francis Nugent, 9th Earl of Westmeath (1805–1879)
- William St George Nugent, 10th Earl of Westmeath (1832–1883)
- Anthony Francis Nugent, 11th Earl of Westmeath (1870–1933)
- Gilbert Charles Nugent, 12th Earl of Westmeath (1880–1971)
- William Anthony Nugent, 13th Earl of Westmeath (1928–2026)
- Sean Charles Weston, 14th Earl of Westmeath (born 1965)

The heir presumptive and last in remainder to the earldom is the present earl's brother, the Hon. Patrick Mark Leonard Nugent (born 1966). The next in remainder to the barony of Delvin is the present earl's 14th cousin twice removed, Charles Anthony Burnell-Nugent (born 1942).

== 13th Earl ==
William Anthony Nugent, 13th Earl of Westmeath (21 November 1928 – 29 June 2026) was the son of the 12th Earl and his wife Doris Imlach. He was educated at Marlborough College and the Royal Military Academy Sandhurst, from where he was commissioned into the Royal Artillery. He retired from the army in 1961, with the rank of Captain, then between 1961 and 1988 he taught at St Andrew's School, Pangbourne. He succeeded as Earl of Westmeath (1621) and as the 18th Baron Delvin (1451) on 20 November 1971.

He married Susanna Margaret Leonard, daughter of James Charles Beresford Whyte Leonard and Barbara Helen Incledon-Webber, on 31 July 1963. They had two children:

- Sean Charles Weston Nugent, 14th Earl of Westmeath, born 16 February 1965
- Hon. Patrick Mark Leonard Nugent, born 6 April 1966, who is the heir presumptive.

Line of succession
- Richard Nugent, 2nd Baron Delvin (died 1475)
  - Hon. James Nugent (d. 1450)
    - Christopher Nugent, 3rd Baron Delvin (died 1493)
      - Hon. Sir Christopher Nugent (died 1531)
        - Richard Nugent, 4th Baron Delvin (died 1537)
          - Richard Nugent, 5th Baron Delvin (1523–1559)
            - Christopher Nugent, 6th Baron Delvin (1544–1602)
              - Richard Nugent, 1st Earl of Westmeath (1583–1642)
                - Christopher, Lord Delvin (died 1625)
                  - Richard Nugent, 2nd Earl of Westmeath (1621–1684)
                    - Christopher, Lord Delvin (died c. 1680)
                      - Richard Nugent, 3rd Earl of Westmeath (died 1714)
                      - Thomas Nugent, 4th Earl of Westmeath (1669–1752)
                      - John Nugent, 5th Earl of Westmeath (1671–1754)
                        - Thomas Nugent, 6th Earl of Westmeath (1714–1792)
                          - George Nugent, 7th Earl of Westmeath (1760–1814)
                            - George Nugent, 1st Marquess of Westmeath (1785–1871)
                    - Thomas Nugent, 1st Baron Nugent of Riverston (died 1715)
                      - William Nugent, 3rd Baron Nugent of Riverston (died 1756)
                        - Anthony Nugent, 4th Baron Nugent of Riverston (1730–1814)
                          - William Nugent, 5th Baron Nugent of Riverston (1773–1851)
                            - Anthony Nugent, 9th Earl of Westmeath (1805–1879)
                              - William Nugent, 10th Earl of Westmeath (1832–1883)
                                - Anthony Nugent, 11th Earl of Westmeath (1870–1933)
                                - Gilbert Nugent, 12th Earl of Westmeath (1880–1971)
                                  - William Nugent, 13th Earl of Westmeath (1928–2026)
                                    - Sean Nugent, 14th Earl of Westmeath (born 1965)
                                    - (1,1). Hon. Patrick Mark Leonard Nugent (born 1966)
    - Andrew Nugent of Donore
      - Andrew Nugent of Clonlost
        - Christopher Nugent of Clonlost (died 1613)
          - James Nugent of Clonlost (died 1626)
            - Thomas Nugent of Clonlost
              - James Nugent of Clonlost
                - Thomas Nugent (died c. 1712)
                  - James Nugent of Clonlost (died c. 1748)
                    - Walter Nugent of Ballybur (died 1789)
                      - John Nugent (died 1827)
                        - Walter Nugent, 1st Baron Nugent (c. 1800–1864, cr. Baron of Austria 1859)
                          - Walter Ruthven Nugent, 2nd Baron Nugent (1836–1907)
                          - Albert Llewellyn Nugent, 3rd Baron Nugent (1841–1909)
                            - Algernon John Fitzroy Nugent, 4th Baron Nugent (1865–1922) (Note: Renounced the Austrian peerage in 1920.)
                            - Frank Burnell-Nugent (1880–1942)
                              - Anthony Frank Burnell-Nugent (1906–1976)
                                - (2). Charles Anthony Burnell–Nugent (born 1942) (Note: In remainder to the barony of Delvin.)
                                - (3). Admiral Sir James Burnell-Nugent (born 1949)
                                  - (4). Anthony James Burnell–Nugent (born 1980)
                                    - (5). Harry Peter Burnell–Nugent (born 2007)
                                  - (6). Rupert Michael Burnell–Nugent (born 1982)
                                  - (7). Thomas Alexander Burnell–Nugent (born 1986)
                                    - (8). Charles Arthur Burnell-Nugent (born 2018)

== Sources ==
- Leigh Rayment's Peerage Pages
