= Clonyn Castle =

Victorian country house in County Westmeath, Ireland

Coordinates: 53°37′N 7°06′W

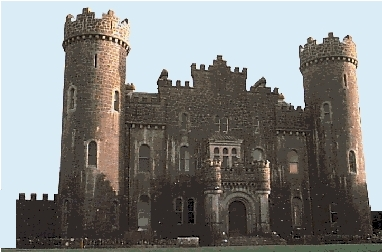
Clonyn Castle, Delvin, County Westmeath

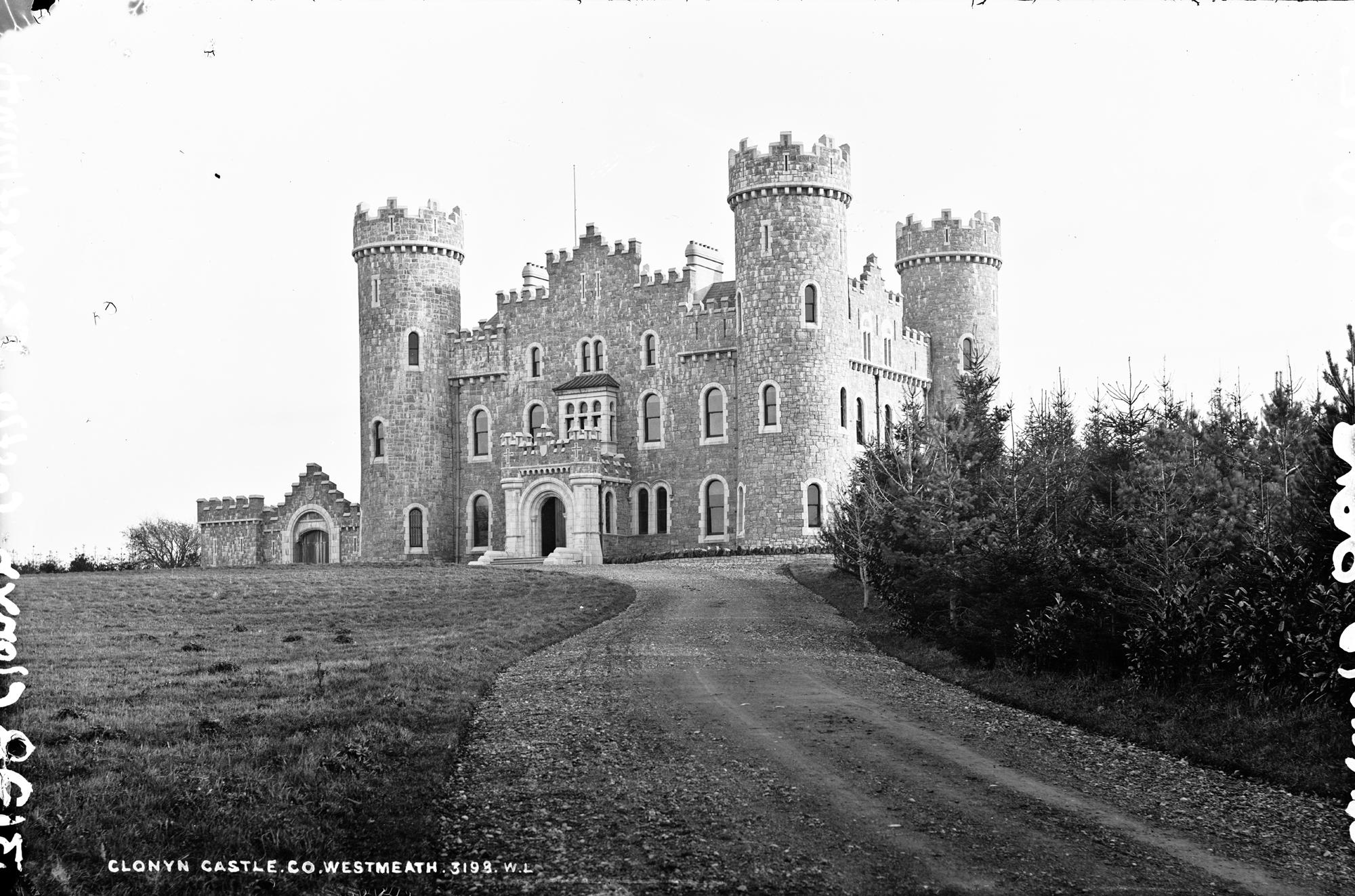
Clonyn Castle, Delvin circa 1900

Clonyn Castle, also known as Delvin Castle, is a Victorian country house situated in Delvin, County Westmeath, Ireland some 18 km from Mullingar along the N52. It is a square, symmetrical, two-storey castle-like building of cut limestone with four tall, round corner towers at each corner. The interior has a large two-storey hall with a gallery and arcading. It was one of the last Victorian baronial castles to be built in Ireland.

A golf course open to the public lies behind the castle, 500m from the centre of Delvin.

== History ==
An early castle (now a ruin in the centre of the village of Delvin) is believed to have been built in 1181 by Hugh de Lacy, Lord of Meath for his brother-in-law, Sir Gilbert de Nugent. Sir Gilbert de Nugent, originally from the Nogent-le-Rotrou area in France, came to Ireland with Hugh de Lacy in 1171. Sir Gilbert was granted the title Baron of Delvin within the Lordship of Meath.

A second castle was built in 1639 by Richard Nugent, 1st Earl of Westmeath, on elevated ground overlooking the village of Delvin and may be referred to as either Delvin or Clonyn Castle. When Cromwell's army approached Nugent caused the house to be burnt down and fled to Galway. The castle was restored by his grandson and occupied until 1860.

The present house was built a short distance away from the previous castle by Lord Greville and his wife Lady Rosa. Following the death of George Nugent, 1st Marquess of Westmeath in 1871, Clonyn had passed to Lady Rosa, his only surviving child. She had married Fulke Southwell Greville-Nugent, 1st Baron Greville, who in 1866 had assumed by Royal Licence the additional surname of Nugent.

This latest building remained a Nugent residence entailed upon heirs male, the last being the Hon. Patrick Greville-Nugent. His sister, the Marquise de la Bedoyere, who'd undertaken litigation against him over his management of the estate, was "entitled on the determination of his life estate provided that he had no male issue. On the registration of a judgment mortgage in 1890 his interest was forfeited, and the estate became vested in the trustees... The Marquise, who had a charge of £111,352 under a mortgage on the property, filed the petition for sale." The property sold in 1922, Greville-Nugent moving to his wife's estate in Scotland.

In 1923, as part of continuing lawlessness in the district, it was gutted by fire due to arson. It was afterwards home to a community of Australian nuns.

In the post-World War II period, at the instigation of Rabbi Solomon Schonfeld, the castle served briefly as a home for Jewish children, most of them orphans of the Holocaust. Manchester businessman and philanthropist Yankel Levy was persuaded to buy the castle and associated land for £30,000 and some 100 children aged between 5 and 17 were temporarily housed before rejoining their families or starting new lives in England, America or Israel. Levy was consequently bankrupted.

It is currently privately owned by Mrs Dillon.

== Other Westmeath Castles ==
- Ballinlough Castle
- Killua Castle
- Knockdrin Castle
- Tyrrellspass Castle
- Tullynally Castle
