= William St George Nugent, 10th Earl of Westmeath =

Irish noble (1832–1883)

William St George Nugent, 10th Earl of Westmeath, (28 November 1832 – 31 May 1883), styled Lord Delvin from 1871 to 1879, was an Anglo-Irish peer.

== Biography ==
A son of Anthony Francis Nugent, 9th Earl of Westmeath and Anne Catherine Daly, Nugent was educated at Oscott College, Sutton Coldfield, Warwickshire, England. On 14 May 1852, he purchased an ensigncy in the 9th Regiment of Foot. He was promoted to lieutenant on 6 June 1854, and served in the Crimean War from 27 November 1854, fighting in the Siege of Sevastopol, including the unsuccessful assault on the Great Redan in June. He bought a captaincy in the regiment on 13 June 1856, and retired from the Army in May 1861. He held the office of High Sheriff of County Galway in 1875. He succeeded to his father's peerages on 12 May 1879.

He married Emily Margaret Blake of Furbo, County Galway, in July 1866 and had issue:

- three unnamed daughters who died young
- Lady Emily Theresa Nugent (died 23 Sep 1935), married Brig.-Gen. Gardiner Humphreys in 1906.
- Anthony Francis Nugent, 11th Earl of Westmeath (11 Jan 1870 – 12 Dec 1933)
- Hon. William Andrew Nugent (11 Mar 1876 – 29 May 1915), married Kathleen Stoner (died 1955)
- Gilbert Charles Nugent, 12th Earl of Westmeath (9 May 1880 – 20 Nov 1971)

Peerage of Ireland
Preceded by Anthony Francis Nugent	Earl of Westmeath; 1879–1883	Succeeded by Anthony Nugent
