= Hyacinth Richard Nugent, 2nd Baron Nugent of Riverston =

Irish baron

Hyacinth Richard Nugent, 2nd Baron Nugent of Riverston (born after 1684 – 5 March 1738) was an Irish army officer and landowner.

== Early life ==
Nugent was a native of Pallas in east County Galway, an estate that his great-grandfather, Richard Nugent, 2nd Earl of Westmeath, had acquired in 1621.

His father was Thomas Nugent, 1st Baron Nugent of Riverston, his mother Marianna Barnewall (a daughter of Henry Barnewall, 2nd Viscount Barnewall of Kingsland and Hon. Mary Netterville).

== Career ==
In 1694 he was outlawed for high treason, probably for supporting James II during the Williamite War in Ireland. However, he must have been rehabilitated, as he served as a Cornet Charles Mordaunt, 3rd Earl of Peterborough's Dragoons while in Spain. From 1715 he styled himself as 2nd Baron Nugent of Riverston. In February 1737 he recovered his estate by Act of Parliament 1728.

== Personal life ==
He married Susanna Catherina Beresford, daughter of Sir Tristram Beresford, 3rd Baronet and Hon. Nichola Sophia Hamilton (youngest daughter of Hugh Hamilton, 1st Viscount of Glenawly), in 1703. He died on 5 March 1738 without issue and was succeeded by his brother, William Nugent, 3rd Baron Nugent of Riverston.

Peerage of Ireland
Preceded by Thomas Nugent	— TITULAR — Baron Nugent of Riverston; Jacobite peerage 1715–1738	Succeeded by William Nugent
