= Baron Nugent of Riverston =

Jacobite title in the Peerage of Ireland

Baron Nugent of Riverston, in County Westmeath, is a title of complex legal status in the Jacobite peerage of the Peerage of Ireland.

The title was created on 3 April 1689 by James II after his deposition from the English throne for Thomas Nugent, Lord Chief Justice of Ireland, in order for Nugent to attend the 1689 Patriot Parliament in Dublin. The title creation was recorded in the Irish Patent Roll. Nugent was subsequently outlawed as a Jacobite by William III of England, but benefitted from the terms of the Treaty of Limerick and recovered his landed property, when he continued to be referred to as Lord Nugent of Riverston.

The title was claimed by the first baron's descendants who styled themselves Barons Nugent of Riverston, but without legal recognition. In July 1839, William Thomas Nugent presented his claim to the House of Lords Privileges Committee, but they adjourned the issue, declaring it sine die. In 1851, the claim to the title was inherited by Anthony Francis Nugent, 9th Earl of Westmeath, from which point it merged with the Earldom of Westmeath.

== Barons Nugent of Riverston (Jacobite Peerage, 1689) ==
- Thomas Nugent, 1st Baron Nugent of Riverston (died 1715)
- Hyacinth Richard Nugent, 2nd Baron Nugent of Riverston (died 1738) (Claimant)
- William Nugent, 3rd Baron Nugent of Riverston (died 1756) (Claimant)
- Anthony Nugent, 4th Baron Nugent of Riverston (1730–1814) (Claimant)
- William Thomas Nugent, 5th Baron Nugent of Riverston (1773–1851) (Claimant)
- Anthony Francis Nugent, 6th Baron Nugent of Riverston (1805–1879) (Claimant)

Succeeded as Earl of Westmeath in 1871. See this title for further claimants.
