= Anthony Francis Nugent, 9th Earl of Westmeath =

Irish peer (1805–1879)

Anthony Francis Nugent, 9th Earl of Westmeath, (1 November 1805 – 12 May 1879) was an Irish peer.

== Biography ==
Nugent was a descendant of Richard Nugent, 2nd Earl of Westmeath, but the title had been carried by a different line of the Nugents, with his own family taking the Jacobite title Baron Nugent of Riverston. He was the son of William Thomas Nugent, 5th Baron Nugent of Riverston and Catherine Bellew of Mount Bellew, County Galway. On the death of his kinsman, George Nugent, 1st Marquess of Westmeath, he succeeded as the 9th Earl though the marquessate became extinct. On 5 May 1871, he simultaneously became the 14th Baron Delvin and the 9th Earl of Westmeath.

He married Anne Catherine Daly, a daughter of Malachy Daly of Raford, Kiltullagh, County Galway, and a descendant of Dermot Ó Daly of Killimordaly, County Galway. Their children were:

- Captain Hon. Malachy Daly Nugent of the 67th regiment, killed in action during the Taiping Rebellion, China, 20 Oct 1862.
- Hon. Julia Catherine Anne Nugent (3 Jun 1830 – 25 Jun 1859), married George Browne, 3rd Marquess of Sligo, but had no issue.
- Lady Mary Frances Nugent (5 b. 3 Oct 1831 – 1 Sep 1892), married Sir Thomas Burke, 3rd Baronet and had six children.
- William St George Nugent, 10th Earl of Westmeath, (28 Nov 1832 – 31 May 1883)
- Hon. Charles Anthony Nugent (10 Mar 1836 – 8 Nov 1906) married Gertrude O'Conor of Mount Druid, County Roscommon, but had no issue.
- Lady Olivia Jane Nugent (20 Mar 1838 – 21 Jan 1903), married Patrick Joseph Mahon Power, D.L., of Faithlegg, County Waterford, and had issue.
- Lady Anne Elizabeth Charlotte Nugent (5 Oct 1839 – 1 Dec 1906) married Colonel John Archer Daly (formerly Blake) of Raford and Barna, and had issue.
- Hon. Richard Anthony Nugent (12 Nov 1842 – 19 Jan 1912) married Theresa Henrietta Gradwell of Dowth Hall, County Meath, and had six children.

Peerage of Ireland
Preceded by George Thomas John Nugent	Earl of Westmeath; 1871–1879	Succeeded by William St George Nugent
Preceded by William Nugent	— TITULAR — Baron Nugent of Riverston; Jacobite peerage 1851–1879	Succeeded by William St George Nugent
