= William Nugent, 3rd Baron Nugent of Riverston =

Irish noble

William Nugent, 3rd Baron Nugent of Riverston (died 1756) was a grandson of Richard Nugent, 2nd Earl of Westmeath (died 1641) via his son Thomas Nugent, 1st Baron Nugent of Riverston, (died 1715). He resided at Pallas, in east County Galway.

He married Bridget Daly of Cloghan, County Offaly (a cousin of), widow of Patrick Kirwan of County Galway, who died before 1719. Their children were:

- Frances Nugent, who married Christopher Chevers in November 1769.
- Anthony Nugent, 4th Baron Nugent of Riverston, born 28 Aug 1730, died Sep 1814.

Peerage of Ireland
Preceded by Hyacinth Richard Nugent	— TITULAR — Baron Nugent of Riverston; Jacobite peerage 1738–1756	Succeeded by Anthony Nugent
