= Coolamber Hall House =

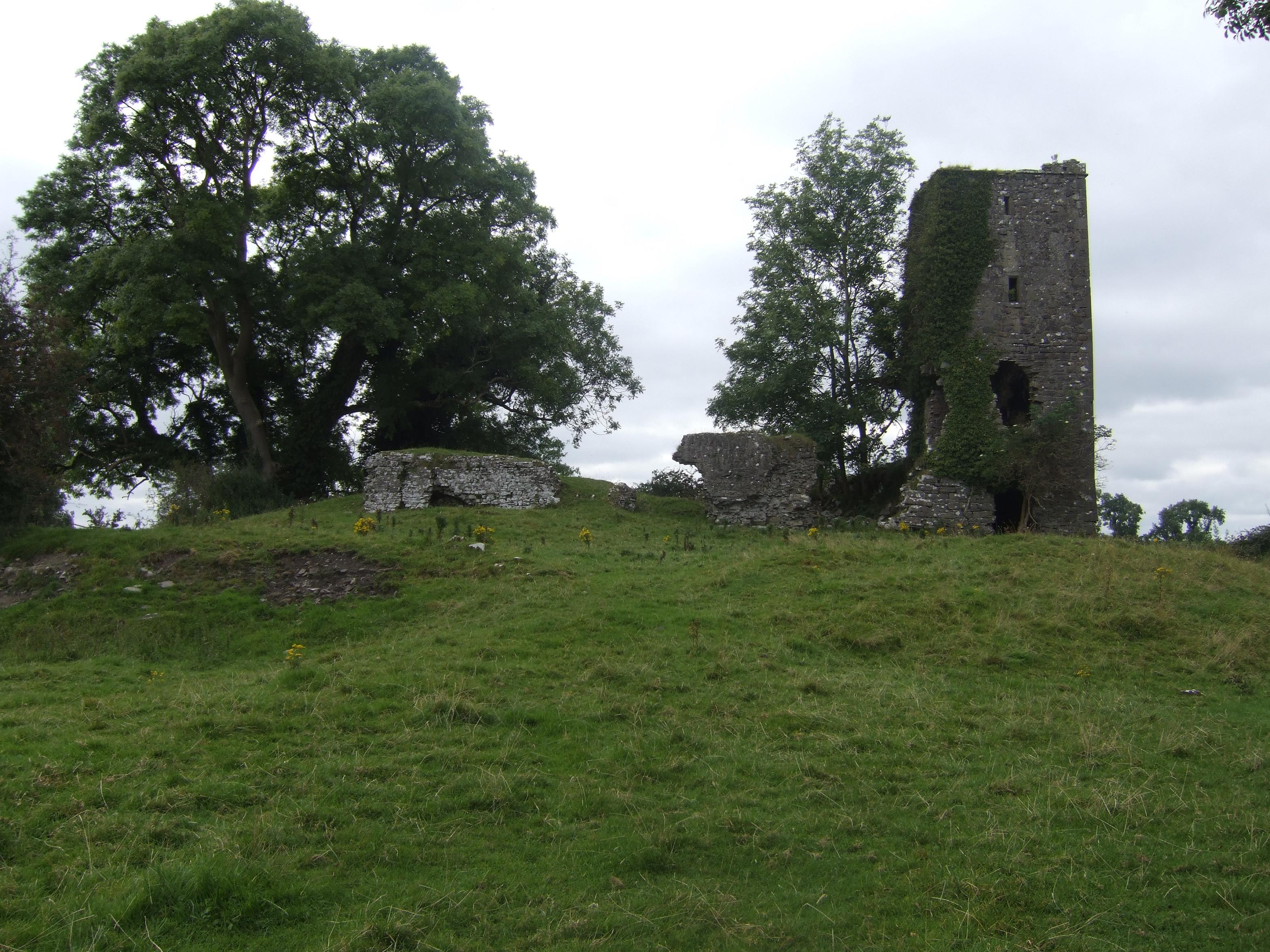
- Coolamber Hall House
- Type: Hall house
- Location: Lismacaffry, County Longford, Ireland
- Coordinates: 53.7097°N 7.477°W
- Built: c. 13th Century
- Architectural style: Late Medieval
- Owner: Private property

Coolamber Hall-House is an Anglo-Norman ruin in County Longford, Ireland that is dated to the early 13th century. Possibly the residence of Thomas Nugent, 4th Earl of Westmeath, one of the commissioners for Plantation of Longford in 1620. Described by Samuel Lewis as ‘the ruins of an old castle, which was besieged by Oliver Cromwell, it formed the boundary of the English Pale’. Hall-houses of this type consist of two-storey buildings with the entrance doorway on the first floor. The entrance was accessed via an external staircase of wood or stone. The main feature of the building was the large first floor hall which was open up to the roof. The ground floor was accessed via a trapdoor or internal staircase and was probably used as a storage area. Many hall-houses like that at Coolamber have been rebuilt or altered considerably.

== Description ==
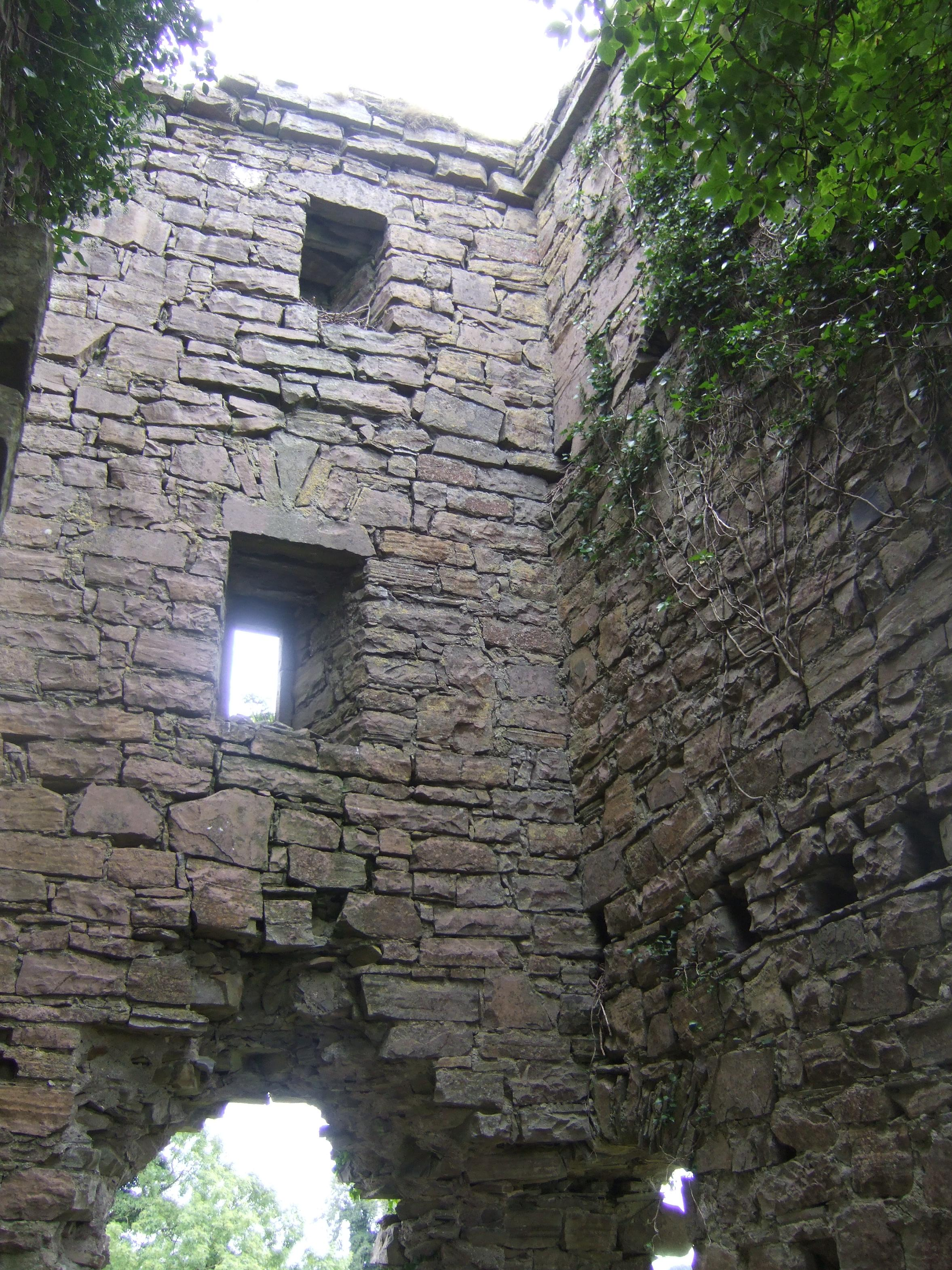
Interior view of a corner of Coolamber Hall House

Coolamber Hall-house consists of a two-storey structure, located on a circular platform approximately 4m high and 40m in diameter. The platform is possibly an older early medieval ringwork that was subsequently reused as a bawn. A late-medieval church is situated approximately 400m to the north-west. The platform is enclosed by the remains of a 1.60m thick and 0.35m high bawn wall. There is a small, rectangular, mural tower on the south-west side. The hall-house has the remains of a barrel-vault at its northern end at ground floor level. Only ruined remains of the walls (max height 2m) of the two-storey block remain.

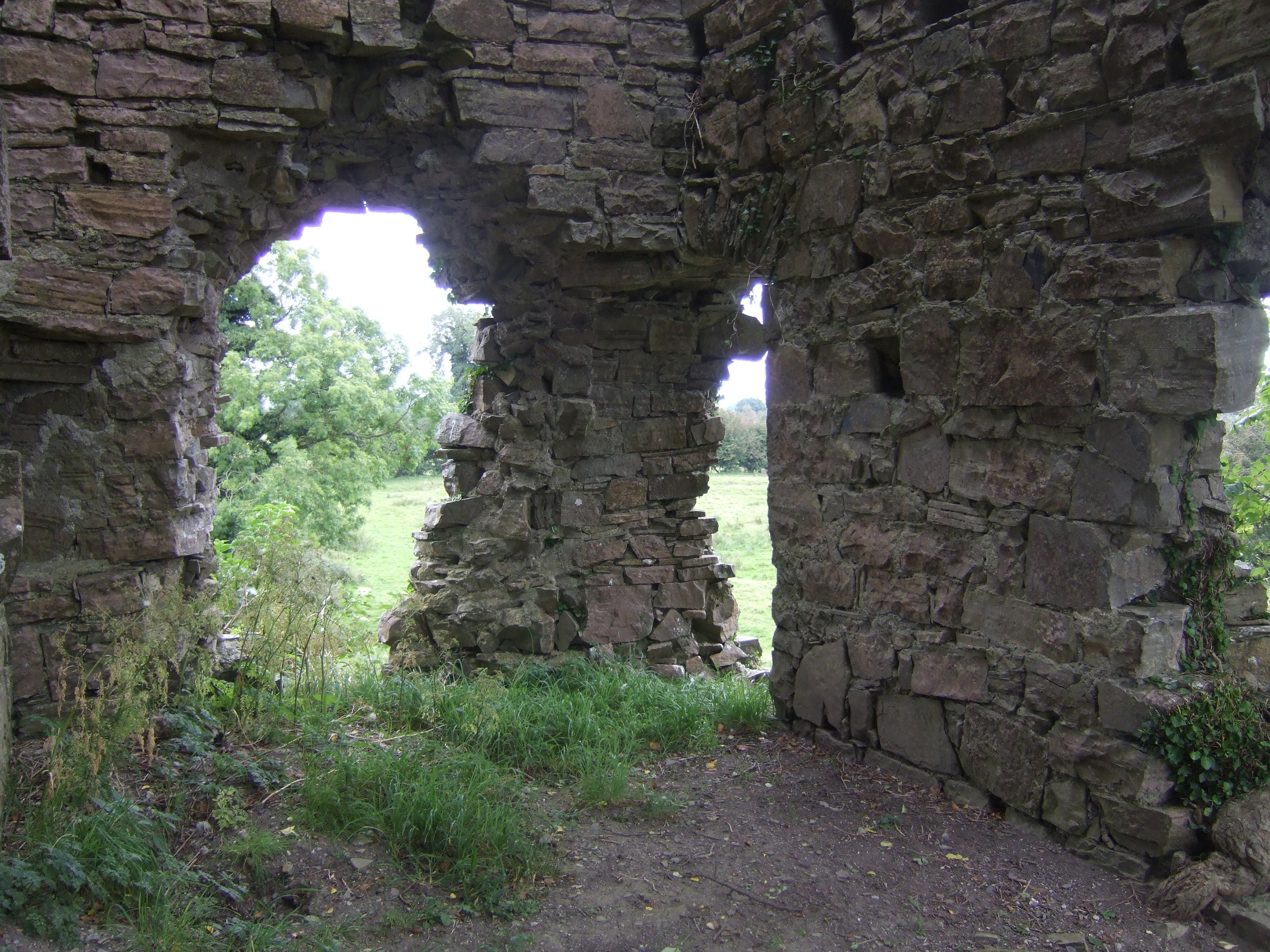
Interior of the tower

== Location ==
Coolamber Hall House is located close to Lismacaffrey Village on the border between County Longford and County Westmeath. It is close to a small cemetery on private property.
