= John Nugent, 5th Earl of Westmeath =

Irish nobleman and professional soldier

John Nugent, 5th Earl of Westmeath (1671 – 3 July 1754) was an Irish nobleman and professional soldier. He was the third son of Christopher Nugent, Lord Delvin and Mary Butler, daughter of Colonel Richard Butler.

Nugent succeeded his brother, Thomas Nugent, 4th Earl of Westmeath, in 1752. He served in the French army, seeing action at Ramillies, Oudenarde, Malplaquet, the sieges of Douai and Quesnoy, and at Denain. He began as an officer in 1706 and ended as Maréchal de camp in 1744. He retired from active service in 1748. He died at Nivelles in Walloon Brabant in 1754.

He married Marguerite Jeanne (died 11 February 1776), the daughter of Count Carlo Molza of Modena, Gentleman Usher to Queen Mary of Modena and his wife Veronique Angelotti, on 7 January 1711, and had issue:

- Thomas Nugent, 6th Earl of Westmeath
- James Nugent
- John Christopher Nugent
- Richard Nugent
- Edward Nugent
- Marie Charlotte Nugent
- François Christine Nugent

He was succeeded by his eldest son Thomas Nugent, 6th Earl of Westmeath. Thomas was the first of the family to conform to the Church of Ireland.

Peerage of Ireland
Preceded by Thomas Nugent	Earl of Westmeath; 1752–1754	Succeeded by Thomas Nugent
