= Richard Nugent, 1st Earl of Westmeath =

Irish nobleman and politician

Richard Nugent, 1st Earl of Westmeath (1583–1642) was an Irish nobleman and politician of the seventeenth century. He was imprisoned for plotting against the English Crown in 1607, but soon obtained a royal pardon, and thereafter was, in general, to be a reliable supporter of the Government, although his loyalty was questioned from time to time. His death resulted from his refusal to take up arms against the English Crown during the Irish Rebellion of 1641.

== Early life ==
He was the eldest son of Christopher Nugent, 6th Baron Delvin, and Lady Mary FitzGerald, daughter of Gerald FitzGerald, 11th Earl of Kildare and his wife Mabel Browne, Countess of Kildare. He succeeded his father as seventh Baron Delvin in 1602.

== Imprisonment ==
Understandably, the Crown even at this very early point in his career regarded him with suspicion: when he was born his father was in custody on charges of treason, and was to die nineteen years later in prison, suspected of plotting fresh acts of treason. Initially, Richard seems to have acted cautiously: he acknowledged the Crown's authority, and he was knighted at Christ Church Cathedral, Dublin in 1603. The Crown's suspicions about his loyalty were fully justified: Delvin was implicated in the conspiracy which led to the Flight of the Earls in 1607 and was imprisoned in Dublin Castle. Due to the lax security in the castle a servant was able to smuggle a rope into his cell, with which he escaped through the window. He fled for refuge to Cloughoughter Castle, a lake fortress owned by his family in County Cavan.

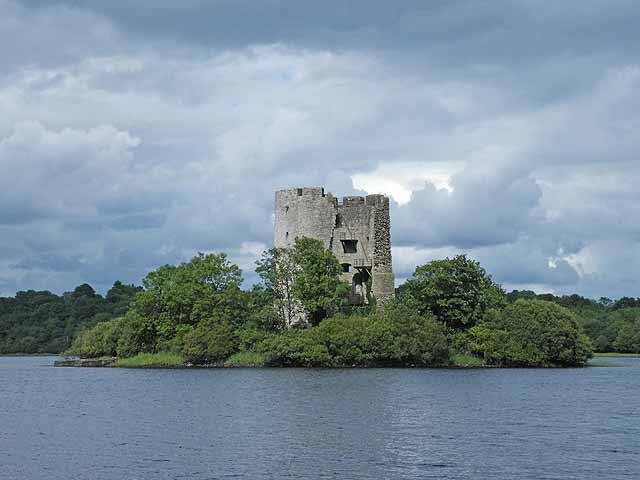
Cloughoughter Castle

His escape coincided with the arrival of Sir Cahir O'Doherty in Dublin to clear up a misunderstanding in which it had mistakenly been believed O'Doherty had been plotting an uprising. Delvin's escape shattered the government's confidence even in loyal Gaelic lords like O'Doherty, who were suspected of being part of a conspiracy with Delvin and others. The following year an aggrieved O'Doherty and his followers burnt the town of Derry, thus launching O'Doherty's Rebellion.

== Pardon ==
In 1608 Delvin, having apparently been given assurances of clemency by the Dublin Government, appeared at the English Court and asked for a royal pardon, pleading his youth and ignorance of the world in mitigation of his actions. He seems to have been a young man who had charm and good looks, which was always a path to favour with King James I, whose fondness for handsome young men was a source of much gossip. Delvin was pardoned and restored to royal favour, although some of his lands were forfeited, including Cloughoughter Castle.

== Political career ==
Thereafter his career until 1641 was one of notable success, although he clashed with the Government on a number of occasions, notably over the creation of new Parliamentary boroughs in 1613, which he opposed on the grounds that they would artificially increase the number of Protestant MPs. He also objected to the proposed Plantation of Ossory in 1623-4, which he predicted correctly would be the forerunner to other and more extensive Plantations.

He received grants of land in several counties in 1611 - including 14,000 acres in County Galway, mainly around Tynagh and Kileen - and was able to build a new dwelling, Clonyn Castle, near the older family home, Nugent Castle. He took his seat in the Irish House of Lords in the Parliaments of 1613-15 and 1634-5, and was appointed a royal commissioner for the redress of grievances in 1633. He accompanied the Duke of Buckingham, the prime royal favourite, to the ill-fated Siege of Saint-Martin-de-Ré in 1627. He was created Earl of Westmeath in 1621, a sign of the King's continued goodwill. As a leading spokesman for the Roman Catholic community, his loyalty was sometimes questioned, especially after his opposition to the Plantation of Ossory in the mid-1620s, but from 1608 onwards his allegiance to the Crown does not seem to have been seriously in doubt.

In the late 1620s, he was deeply involved in negotiating the religious concessions to Roman Catholics which are popularly known as "The Graces". In 1634-5 the Lord Lieutenant of Ireland, Thomas Wentworth, 1st Earl of Strafford, cancelled the Graces. This, and his inability to work with the stern and intimidating Strafford, who was virtually all-powerful in Ireland, caused Westmeath to largely retire from public life in the late 1630s.

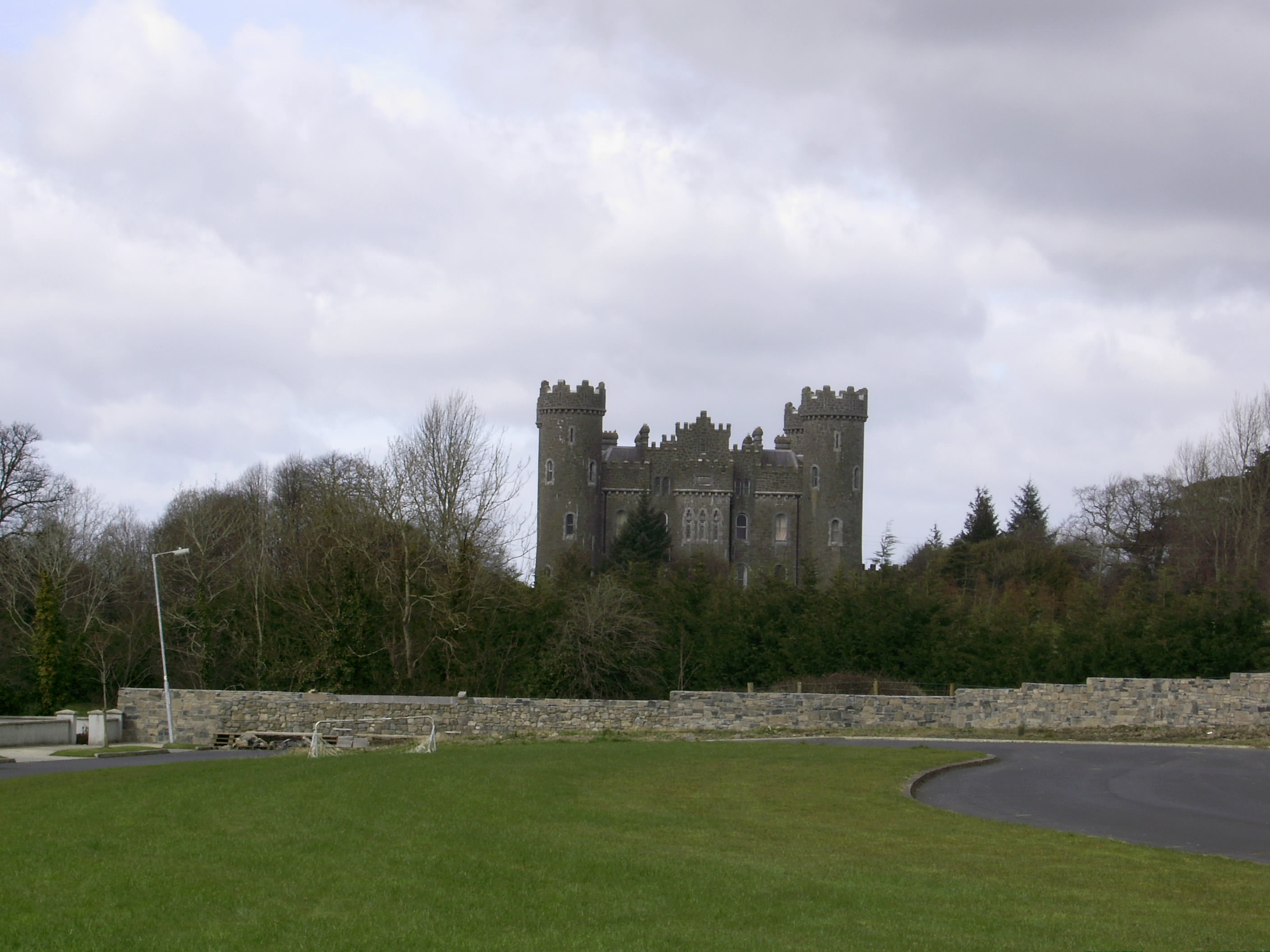
Clonyn Castle, which the Earl built as the new family seat.

== Death ==
On the outbreak of the Irish Rebellion of 1641 the Earl, unlike many of the Anglo-Irish nobility, remained loyal to the Crown, although at least one of his sons (with his knowledge if not his approval) took the rebels' side. Concerned that he was exposed to his enemies at Clonyn, the Government sent a party to accompany him to Dublin. The party was ambushed at Athboy and the Earl was captured. He was rescued, but attacked again near Trim. He was seriously injured in the second attack and being nearly sixty, blind and afflicted with "palsy", he died from his injuries.

== Family ==
Richard Nugent married Jenet Plunkett, daughter of Christopher Plunkett, 9th Baron Killeen and Jenet Dillon, and sister of Luke Plunkett, 1st Earl of Fingall. According to family tradition, Lady Westmeath was nicknamed Jenny the Scraper due to her thrift and her determination not to allow any household scraps to be wasted.

They had five sons:

- Christopher, Baron Delvin
- Francis
- John, the ancestor of the Austrian Counts Nugent von Westmeath
- Lawrence
- Ignatius (died 1671), who was a Colonel in the French service.

Christopher pre-deceased his father leaving an only son Richard, who succeeded as second Earl of Westmeath. The second Earl was a leader of Confederate Ireland, and suffered greatly as a result, but was compensated at the Restoration of Charles II.

They also had two daughters :

- Bridget
- Mary.

Peerage of Ireland
New creation	Earl of Westmeath; 1621–1642	Succeeded by Richard Nugent
Preceded by Christopher Nugent	Baron Delvin; 1602–1642	Succeeded by Richard Nugent
