= Thomas Nugent, 4th Earl of Westmeath =

Irish soldier and peer

Thomas Nugent, 4th Earl of Westmeath (1669 - 30 June 1752) was an Irish soldier and peer. He was the second son of Christopher Nugent, Lord Delvin and Mary Butler, daughter of Colonel Richard Butler. He was likely the resident of Coolamber Hall House.

Nugent served in the Irish army of James II as a Colonel of Foot, being outlawed by William III on 11 May 1691. He fought at the Siege of Limerick (1690) and Siege of Limerick (1691) while commanding a regiment of cavalry. His outlawry was reversed in 1697. Like nearly all the family he was a Roman Catholic.

Nugent succeeded his brother, Richard Nugent, 3rd Earl of Westmeath, in 1714. He was married to Margaret Bellew, a daughter of John Bellew, 1st Baron Bellew of Duleek, and Mary Bermingham, with whom he had issue:

- Lady Katherine Nugent (married Andrew Nugent of Desart, County Westmeath, and had issue Barbara Nugent, who married James O'Reilly and was the mother of Sir Hugh O'Reilly Nugent, 1st Baronet)
- Christopher Nugent, Lord Delvin (died 12 Apr 1752, unmarried)
- Hon. John Nugent (died 21 Jul 1725, unmarried)
- Lady Mary Nugent (1694-July 1725, married Francis Bermingham, 14th Baron Athenry and had issue).

Nugent was succeeded by his younger brother, John Nugent, 5th Earl of Westmeath.

Peerage of Ireland
Preceded by Richard Nugent	Earl of Westmeath; 1714–1752	Succeeded by John Nugent
