= Thomas Nugent, 6th Earl of Westmeath =

Irish noble

The Right Honourable The Earl of Westmeath KP PC (Ire)

Personal details
- Born: April 1714 Kingdom of Ireland
- Died: 7 September 1792 (aged 79) Kingdom of Ireland
- Spouse: Mary Stapleton (m. 1742) Catherine White (m. 1756)
- Children: 5, including George Nugent
- Parents: John Nugent, 5th Earl of Westmeath (father); Marguerite Jeanne Molza (mother)

Thomas Nugent, 6th Earl of Westmeath KP PC (Ire) (April 1714 – 7 September 1792), styled Lord Delvin from 1752 to 1754 was an Irish peer and freemason.

He gained the title Earl of Westmeath in 1754 on the death of his father John Nugent, 5th Earl of Westmeath. His mother was Marguerite Jeanne Molza of Modena, daughter of Count Carlo Molza, who was Gentleman Usher to Queen Mary of Modena, and his wife Veronique Angelotti. His father was a professional soldier who spent most of his adult life on the Continent and died at Nivelles.

In 1758, he was sworn of the Privy Council of Ireland. Nugent was appointed Grandmaster of the Grand Lodge of Ireland in 1763, a post he held for the following four years. Unlike his father, and their predecessors, he conformed, at least publicly, to the Church of Ireland.

By his first wife, Mary Stapleton, daughter of Walter Stapleton, he had one son:

- Richard Nugent, Lord Delvin (1742–1761)

By his second wife, Catherine White, daughter of Henry White of Pitchfordstown, County Kildare he had three sons and one daughter:

- Thomas Nugent, Lord Delvin (died young)
- George Frederick Nugent, 7th Earl of Westmeath (1760–1814)
- Hon. Henry Nugent (24 November 1762 – May 1770)
- Lady Catherine Nugent (6 April 1766 – 26 February 1794), married Hon. John Rodney

Westmeath was made a Founding Knight of the Order of St Patrick on 11 March 1783. He died in 1792 and was succeeded by his son George.

Masonic offices
Preceded by Sir Edward King, 5th Bt	Grandmaster of the Grand Lodge of Ireland; 1763–1767	Succeeded by The Earl of Cavan
Peerage of Ireland
Preceded by John Nugent	Earl of Westmeath; 1754–1792	Succeeded by George Nugent
