= Anthony Nugent, 11th Earl of Westmeath =

Irish peer (1870–1933)

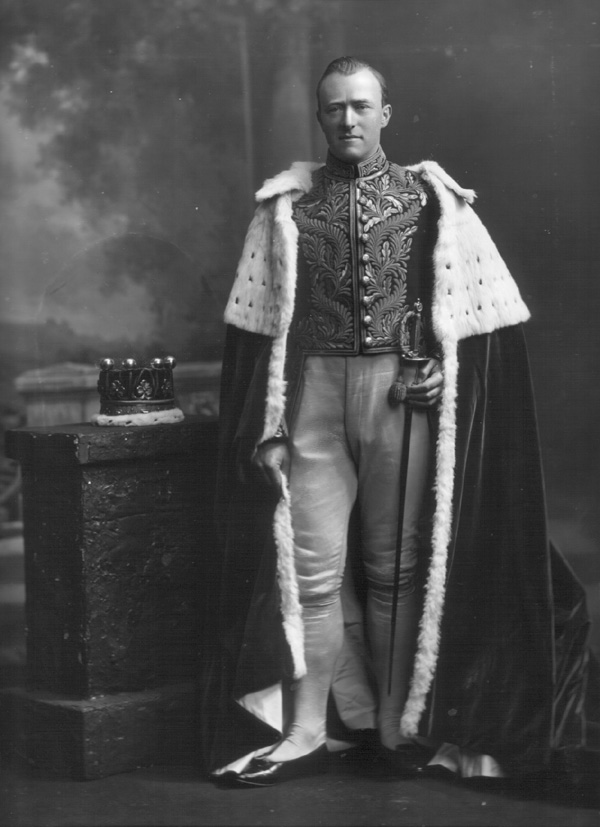
Lord Westmeath wearing coronation robes, 1911

Anthony Francis Nugent, 11th Earl of Westmeath, PC (Ire) (11 January 1870 – 12 December 1933), styled Lord Delvin from 1879 to 1883, was an Irish peer. He was elected an Irish representative peer in 1901. Lord Westmeath occupied properties at Pallas and Spring Garden, Tynagh, County Galway. He owned over 14,000 acres (57 km^{2}) in County Galway in the 1870s as well as property in County Roscommon in the parish of Ogulla, barony of Roscommon.

Educated at Oratory School, South Kensington, and Christ Church, Oxford University. He served as an Honorary Attaché to Washington 1895–1897, and as Assistant Secretary to the Royal Commission to inquire into French Treaty Rights in Newfoundland in 1898. From 1898 to 1901 he was Assistant Private Secretary to the Secretary of State for the Colonies. He held the office of Deputy Lieutenant of County Galway, and was a Justice of the Peace.

Lord Westmeath was appointed to the Privy Council of Ireland in the 1902 Coronation Honours list published on 26 June 1902, and was sworn in by the Lord Lieutenant of Ireland, Earl Cadogan, at Dublin Castle on 11 August 1902. He was appointed a member of the Senate of the Royal University of Ireland in December 1902.

He died without issue. All his titles devolved upon his youngest surviving brother, Gilbert Nugent.

Peerage of Ireland
Preceded by William St George Nugent	Earl of Westmeath; 1883–1933	Succeeded by Gilbert Charles Nugent
Political offices
Preceded by The Lord Farnham	Representative peer for Ireland; 1901–1933	Office lapsed
