= Richard Nugent (newspaperman) =

Canadian newspaperman (1815–1858)

Richard Nugent (May 1815 – March 1858) was a Canadian newspaperman.

Born in Halifax, Nova Scotia, Nugent learned the newspaper trade at the Novascotian with Joseph Howe during the 1830s. He then worked in the United States for four years. He returned to the Novascotian where he assumed an increasing role, starting from a manager of the office on a salaried basis in 1840 to taking over ownership in 1842.

Nugent's editorial policy at the various newspapers he published was one of independence and wide-ranging in content. The stance of his newspapers was always highly liberal, often even opposing the stances of the Catholic Church, of which he was a member. His newspaper career was one of intense editorial battles resulting in libel suits and more personal attacks. A staunch supporter of Howe's liberal views throughout his career, he never received the recognition he deserved. He played a crucial role in the advancement of responsible government in Nova Scotian politics.
