= Richard Nugent, 3rd Earl of Westmeath =

Irish peer and Roman Catholic monk

Richard Nugent, 3rd Earl of Westmeath, born before 1669, died April 1714, was an Irish peer and Roman Catholic monk.

Nugent was the eldest son of Christopher Nugent, Lord Delvin and Mary Butler (a daughter of Colonel Hon. Richard Butler and Lady Frances Tuchet). He succeeded his grandfather, Richard Nugent, 2nd Earl of Westmeath, as 3rd Earl. However, he was a Capuchin friar based in France and so had no descendants. He was succeeded by his brother, Thomas Nugent, 4th Earl of Westmeath.

Peerage of Ireland
Preceded by Richard Nugent	Earl of Westmeath; 1684–1714	Succeeded by Thomas Nugent
