= Gilbert Charles Nugent, 12th Earl of Westmeath =

Gilbert Charles Nugent, 12th Earl of Westmeath (9 May 1880 – 20 November 1971), styled Hon. Gilbert Nugent until 1933, was a son of the 10th Earl and younger brother of the 11th. Nugent, born in Dublin, fought in World War I, during which his older brother, Captain William Andrew Nugent, was killed in action in 1915. He was wounded twice and mentioned in despatches, serving as a Major in the Royal Artillery.

He married Doris Imlach of Liverpool on 20 November 1915, and they made their home at Flowerhill House, Tynagh, County Galway. Their children William and Pamela were born there. However, in 1929 he sold Flowerhill House and 180 acres (73 ha) to John Walsh of Kylebrack.

Upon the death of his brother in 1933, Nugent succeeded to all his titles. Most of the estate had been bought out by tenants in 1903, and in 1934 he sold the remainder of the estate, which included Pallas Mansion, built on a twelve-acre site and with some five hundred acres of an estate, by his ancestor in the early 18th century.

Pamela (born 1921) served as Section Officer in the Women's Auxiliary Air Force during World War II. She married Brigadier John Ewart Trounce Barbary, on 23 September 1950, and had children Michael (born 1951) and Joanna (born 1955). She died on 3 February 2003. Her brother, William, became the 13th Earl.

Peerage of Ireland
Preceded by Anthony Nugent	Earl of Westmeath; 1933–1971	Succeeded by William Anthony Nugent
