= Thomas Nugent, 1st Baron Nugent of Riverston =

Irish Roman Catholic barrister

Thomas Nugent (died May 1715) was an Irish Roman Catholic barrister who became Lord Chief Justice of Ireland under James II of Great Britain, and held a 1689 title as Baron Nugent of Riverston (of complex legal status).

== Early life ==
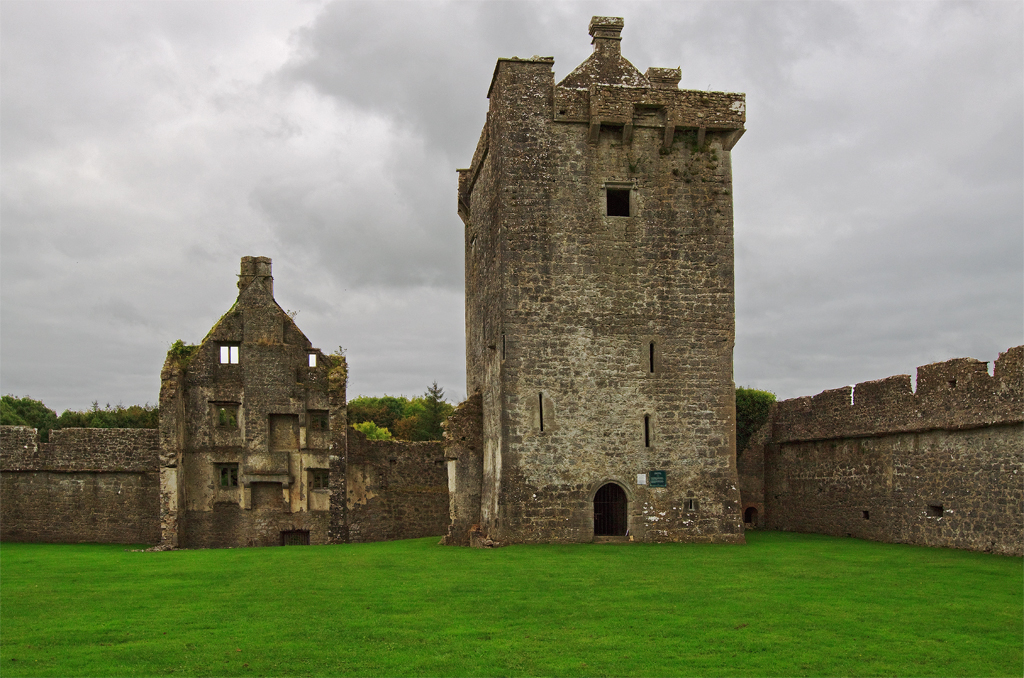
Pallas Castle, County Galway, Nugent's family home

He was the second son of Richard Nugent, 2nd Earl of Westmeath, by his wife Mary, daughter of Sir Thomas Nugent, 1st Baronet, of Moyrath, and widow of Christopher Plunkett. He was brought up to the law, and after the accession of James II, he was made King's Counsel in September 1685, although his enemies said that he was "no lawyer", and he certainly did not have a large practice. During the following winter, he was in communication with the Lord-Lieutenant of Ireland, Henry Hyde, 2nd Earl of Clarendon, who treated him as a representative of the Irish Catholics.

Nugent made his residence at Pallas, County Galway, an estate that his grandfather had acquired in 1621. He married in 1680 to Marianna Barnewall, daughter of Henry Barnewall (died 1688), 2nd Viscount Barnewall of Kingsland and Hon. Mary Netterville. Their children were:

- Hyacinth Richard Nugent, 2nd Baron Nugent of Riverston, born after 1684, died 5 Mar 1737/38
- William Nugent, 3rd Baron Nugent of Riverston, died 11 May 1756
- Mary Nugent

His title of Baron Nugent of Riverston, though disputed in law, was borne by his descendants until it merged in the earldom of Westmeath (1839). There was a full-length portrait of him in his robes by Peter Lely, in the hall at Pallas Castle, County Galway.

== Professional life ==
In March 1686 he was made a judge of the Court of King's Bench (Ireland). In May he was admitted to the Privy Council of Ireland, and in October 1687 became Lord Chief Justice. His court was occupied with reversing outlawries of Catholics. One of his first acts was to present the Lord-Lieutenant with a list of new sheriffs: Clarendon regarded most of them as being clearly unfit for any public office, even those who were Protestants. An act of Henry VII, forbidding the keeping of guns without license of government, was revived and interpreted so as to deprive Protestants of their arms. Nugent said it was treason to possess weapons, though a fine of £20 was the highest penalty prescribed by the act. Clarendon records some instances of judicial partiality in Nugent, but he showed humanity in Ashton's case. He was often criticized for his undignified manner on the Bench, and was inclined to squabble with colleagues, notably Sir John Lyndon, over who had precedence.

Early in 1688 Richard Talbot, 1st Earl of Tyrconnell sent Nugent to England with the Chief Baron of the Irish Exchequer, Stephen Rice, to concert measures for the repeal of the Act of Settlement 1662. Nugent made a poor impression at Court, and both judges were subject to ridicule by the London public. They returned to Ireland in April without having been able to persuade James to let Tyrconnell hold a Parliament.

Nugent was holding the assizes at Cork when James landed at Kinsale in March 1689. After the Capture of Bandon he ordered the people of Bandon who had declared for William III to be indicted for high treason. Nugent was for severity, but General Justin MacCarthy overawed him into respecting the capitulation and join in persuading James to issue a general pardon to the defeated townspeople. Nugent was consulted by James at his landing, the Comte d'Avaux and John Drummond, 1st Earl of Melfort being present.

In the Patriot Parliament which met on 7 May 1689, Nugent, being called by writ on the opening day to the barony of Nugent of Riverston, sat as a peer, and on the 13th introduced a bill for the repeal of the Acts of Settlement and Explanation. He took an active part in the House of Lords, and frequently presided. In July he was made a commissioner of the empty Irish treasury, and the commission was renewed in 1690, a few days before the Battle of the Boyne. Nugent was at Limerick during or soon after William's initial siege, and acted as secretary in Sir Richard Nagle's absence from September till the following January. He was accused by the Irish of holding secret communication with the Williamites, and of a plot to surrender Limerick. At the capitulation he had a pass from Ginkell to go home to Pallas.

Nugent was outlawed as a rebel, but subsequently benefitted from the provisions of the Treaty of Limerick, and his lands remained in the family. He died in 1715.

Legal offices
Preceded by Sir William Davys	Lord Chief Justice of Ireland; 1687–1690	Succeeded by Sir Richard Reynell
Peerage of Ireland
New creation	— TITULAR — Baron Nugent of Riverston; Jacobite peerage 1689–1715	Succeeded by Hyacinth Nugent
