= George Nugent, 1st Marquess of Westmeath =

Anglo-Irish peer

The Most Honourable The Marquess of Westmeath
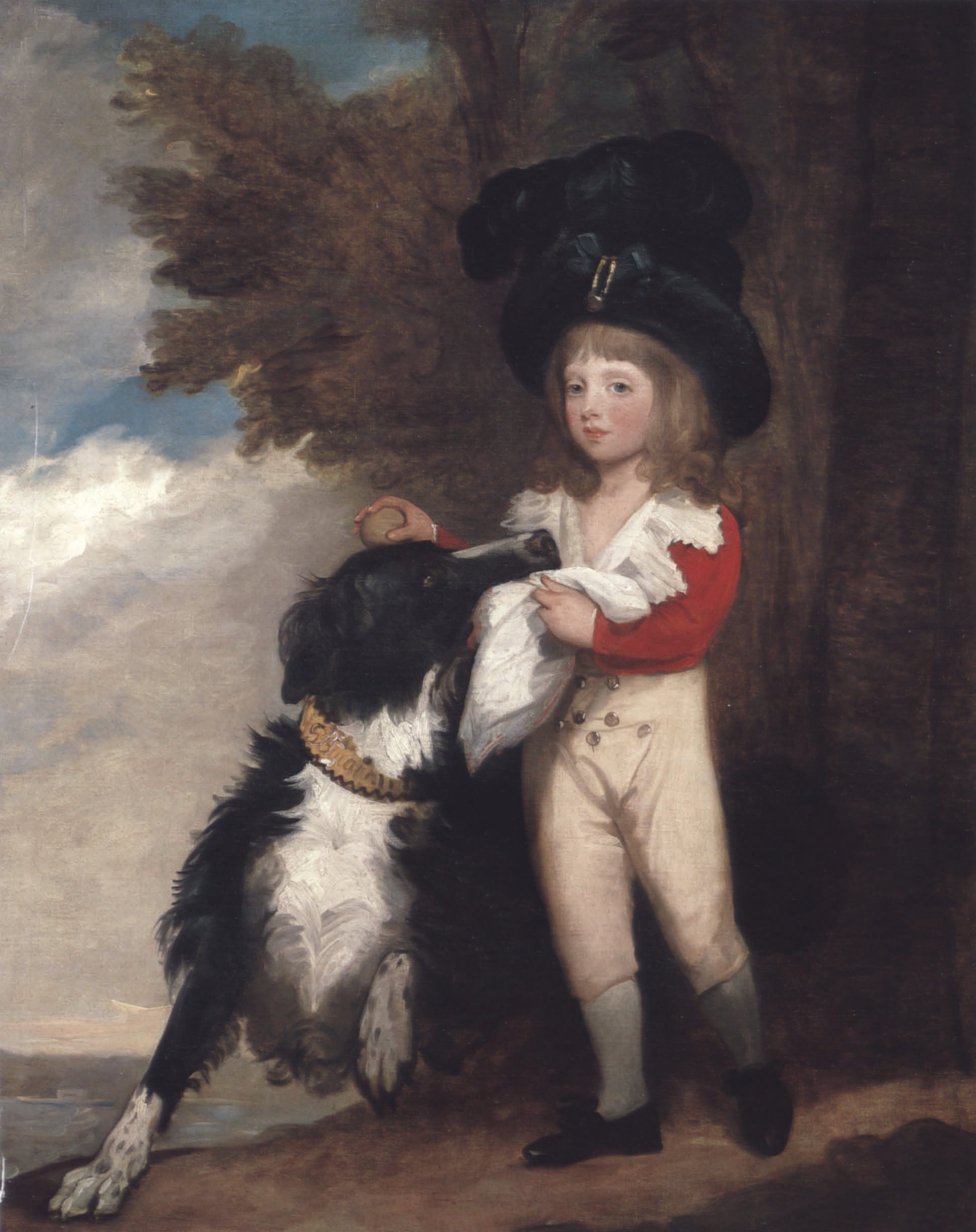
- portrait as a child by Gilbert Stuart, c. 1789-90

Lord Lieutenant of Westmeath
- In office 1831–1871
- Preceded by: Office established
- Succeeded by: The Lord Greville

Personal details
- Born: 17 July 1785
- Died: 5 May 1871 (aged 85)
- Spouse(s): Emily Cecil (m. 1812 div. 1827); Maria Jervis (m. 1858 div. 1862); Elizabeth Verner (m. 1864 d. 1882)
- Children: William (1818–1819); Rosa (1814–1883); Eliza (1806–1877) (illegitimate); Cecilia (1849–1886) (illegitimate)

George Thomas John Nugent, 1st Marquess of Westmeath (17 July 1785 – 5 May 1871), styled Lord Delvin between 1792 and 1814 and known as the Earl of Westmeath between 1814 and 1821, was an Anglo-Irish peer.

== Background ==
Nugent was born in Clonyn, County Westmeath, the only surviving son of George Frederick Nugent, 7th Earl of Westmeath, and Maryanne, daughter of Major James St John Jeffereyes and Arabella Fitzgibbon. His parents divorced in 1796 after his father's discovery of his mother's affair with Augustus Cavendish-Bradshaw, which also resulted in a celebrated action for criminal conversation. Both his parents were quickly remarried, his mother to her lover, and his father to Lady Elizabeth Moore, daughter of Charles Moore, 1st Marquess of Drogheda.

== Career ==
Delvin was an officer in the Coldstream Guards and served in the Egyptian Campaign. He succeeded his father in the earldom in December 1814. He also succeeded him as Colonel of the Westmeath Militia. In 1822, he was created Marquess of Westmeath in the Peerage of Ireland. As these were Irish peerages they did not entitle him to an automatic seat in the House of Lords. However, in 1831 he was elected an Irish representative peer. The same year he was also appointed Lord-Lieutenant of Westmeath, a post he held until his death.

== Family ==
Lord Westmeath was married three times. He married firstly Lady Emily Anne Bennet Elizabeth Cecil, daughter of James Cecil, 1st Marquess of Salisbury, and Lady Emily Mary Hill, on 29 May 1812. They had two children:

- William Henry Wellington Brydges Nugent, Lord Delvin (24 November 1818 – 16 November 1819)
- Lady Rosa Emily Mary Anne Nugent (1814–1883), married Fulke Greville-Nugent, 1st Baron Greville.

Lord Westmeath and Lady Emily divorced in 1827, having separated, been reconciled and then entered a second legal separation. Her unsuccessful efforts to obtain custody of her daughter later led her to campaign for reform of the law together with the prominent writer and feminist Caroline Norton. He married, secondly, Maria Jervis on 18 February 1858. They divorced in 1862. He married, lastly, Elizabeth Charlotte Verner, daughter of David Verner and niece of Sir William Verner, 1st Baronet, on 12 July 1864.

He also had an illegitimate daughter, Eliza Nugent (c. 1806 - 14 September 1877), who married Alfred Harley, 6th Earl of Oxford and Mortimer.

Through his other illegitimate daughter (by Maria Joséphine Touret), Cecilia Henrietta Nugent (1849-1886), who married Willem Boissevain (1849-1925), he is an ancestor of Annemarie, Duchess of Parma.

Lord Westmeath died in May 1871, aged 85, when the marquessate became extinct. His two half-brothers, Robert and Thomas, had predeceased him, without issue. He was succeeded in his remaining titles by his kinsman, Anthony Nugent, of the junior branch of the family which had the title Baron Nugent of Riverston. The Marchioness of Westmeath died in September 1882.

== See also ==
- The Dukes of Buckingham. Retrieved 11 February 2009

Honorary titles
New office	Lord Lieutenant of Westmeath; 1831–1871	Succeeded by The Lord Greville
Political offices
Preceded by The Earl of Bandon	Representative peer for Ireland; 1831–1871	Succeeded by The Lord Ventry
Peerage of Ireland
New creation	Marquess of Westmeath; 1822–1871	Extinct
Preceded by George Nugent	Earl of Westmeath; 1814–1871	Succeeded by Anthony Nugent
