= Anthony Nugent, 4th Baron Nugent of Riverston =

Irish noble (1730–1814)

Anthony Nugent, 4th Baron Nugent of Riverston, 28 August 1730- September 1814. He married Olivia French (daughter of Arthur French and Olivia Ussher), on 25 June 1772. French was a member of the Tribes of Galway on her paternal side, and a descendant of Sir William Ussher (1561-1659) on her maternal side.

Nugent lived at Pallas in east County Galway. His children were:

- Olivia Emily Nugent (d. Sep 1856), married Christopher Dillon Bellew of Mount Bellew, Galway
- William Thomas Nugent, 5th Baron Nugent of Riverston, b. 29 Sep 1773, d. 6 Sep 1851
- Arthur Anthony Nugent of Cranna (29 Aug 1774 – 14 Apr 1858), married Maria Gore and had issue: Arthur (1805–85), Anthony (1809–76), and Charles (1813–39).

Peerage of Ireland
Preceded by William Nugent	— TITULAR — Baron Nugent of Riverston; Jacobite peerage 1756–1814	Succeeded by William Thomas Nugent
