= Richard Nugent, 2nd Earl of Westmeath =

Irish nobleman

Richard Nugent, 2nd Earl of Westmeath (1621/23 – 25 February 1684) was an Irish nobleman.

== Life ==
He was the grandson of Richard Nugent, 1st Earl of Westmeath and Jenet Plunkett. Nugent's father, Christopher, Lord Delvin, had predeceased the first Earl, meaning that Richard Nugent succeeded to the earldom on his grandfather's death in 1641. His mother was Lady Anne MacDonnell, daughter of Randal MacDonnell, 1st Earl of Antrim and his wife Ellis (or Alice) O'Neill, daughter of Hugh O'Neill, Earl of Tyrone and his fourth wife Catherine Magennis.

Before 1641 he married his kinswoman, Mary Nugent (widow of Christopher Plunkett, who was a younger son of Christopher Plunkett, 8th Baron of Dunsany), and daughter of Sir Thomas Nugent, 1st Baronet of Moyrath and his wife Alison Barnewall, daughter of Robert Barnewall of Robertstown, County Meath.

While attempting to make his way back to Ireland in December 1641 upon the outbreak of the 1641 Rebellion, Nugent was arrested on suspicion of complicity in the uprising. He subsequently served as cavalry commander during the Irish Confederate Wars, seeing action at the Battle of Dungan's Hill in August 1647, where he was captured. He later served as General of the Forces of Leinster from 1650 to 1652. His conduct as a military leader was severely criticised by his own side: he was called a general who had never put an army in the field, nor gained the support of anyone who could perform an action worth sixpence. During Oliver Cromwell's campaign in Ireland, Clonyn Castle, the main Nugent residence, was burnt: according to one account Lord Westmeath burnt it himself to prevent it falling into his enemy's hands. He submitted to the Parliamentary forces in the latter year but was excluded from the Act of Settlement 1652 and transplanted to Connaught, despite his rather abject pleas to be allowed to remain, and protestations of loyalty to the new regime. After the Restoration of Charles II, he received a large pension as a reward for his loyalty to the Crown, which, in accordance with the general policy of Indemnity and Oblivion, was prepared to overlook his later subservience to Cromwell. He took no further part in public affairs.

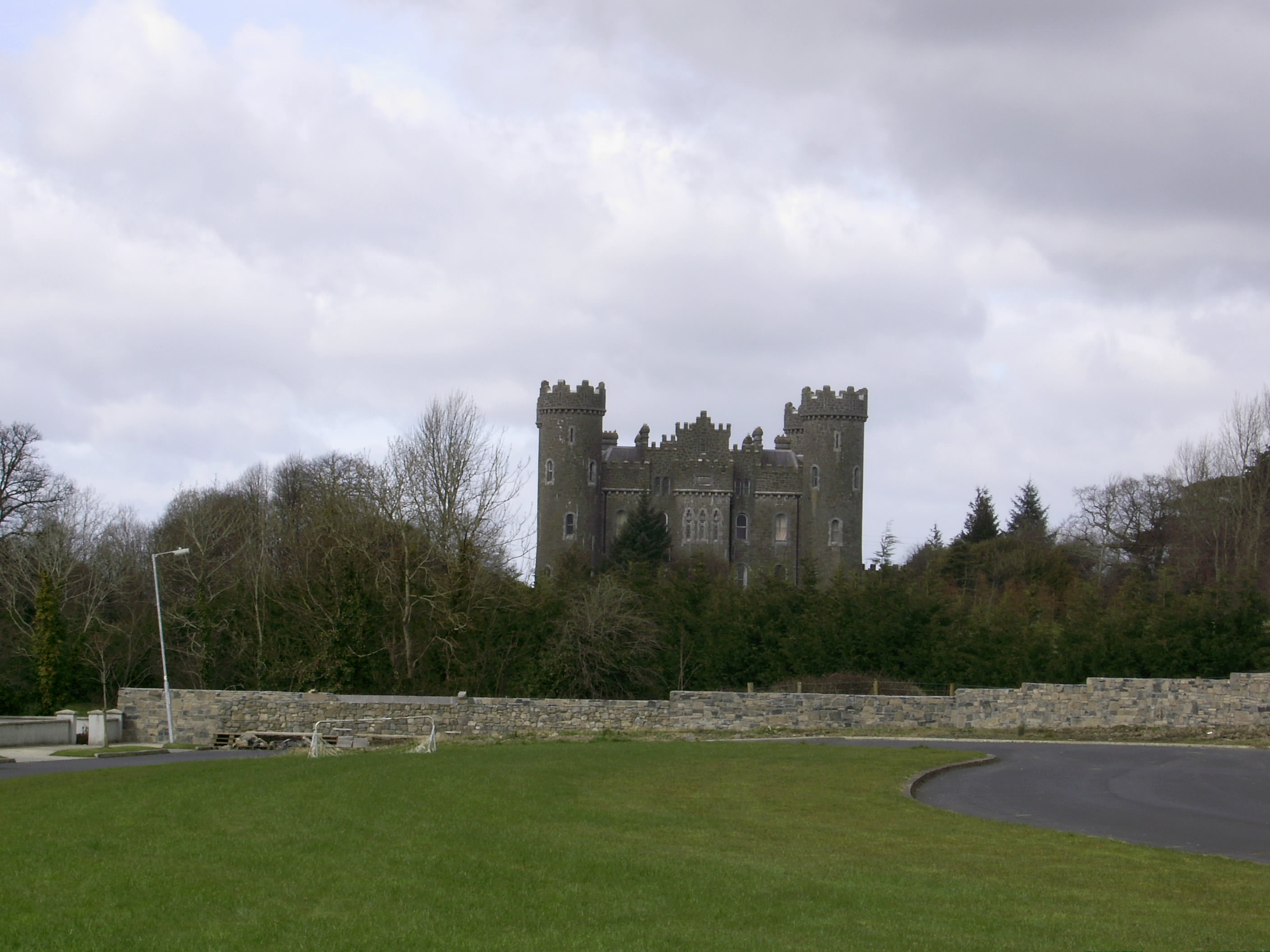
Clonyn Castle, the Westmeath family home

== Family ==
Richard and Mary Nugent had the following issue:

- Christopher Nugent, Lord Delvin, married Mary Butler, died before 1680, leaving issue
- Lady Anne Nugent, married firstly Lucas Dillon, 6th Viscount Dillon, and secondly Sir William Talbot, 3rd Baronet, and died after 14 Jul 1710. She had no issue by either marriage
- Thomas Nugent, 1st Baron Nugent of Riverston, Lord Chief Justice of Ireland, died 2 Apr 1715, ancestor of the present Earl of Westmeath
- Lady Mary Nugent b. 21 Feb 1648, married Henry Barnewall, 2nd Viscount Barnewall of Kingsland, and died 25 Jun 1680
- William Nugent, MP for County Westmeath (died 1690)
- Lady Alison Nugent, married Henry Dowdall of Brownstown, County Meath
- Lady Jane Nugent, married Brigadier-General Alexander MacDonnell of County Leitrim in 1685.

He was succeeded by his grandson, Richard Nugent, 3rd Earl of Westmeath, eldest son of Christopher, Lord Delvin. The third Earl was a monk who spent most of his adult life in France, and on his death, the title passed to his two younger brothers, Thomas and John, in turn.

Peerage of Ireland
Preceded by Richard Nugent	Earl of Westmeath; 1642–1684	Succeeded by Richard Nugent
