= Multyfarnham (disambiguation) =

Multyfarnham is a village in County Westmeath, Ireland.

Multyfarnham may also refer to:

== Places ==
Republic of Ireland

- Multyfarnham (civil parish), a civil parish in the barony of Corkaree, County Westmeath
- Multyfarnham or Fearbranagh, a townland spanning Stonehall and Tyfarnham civil parishes, barony of Corkaree, County Westmeath
- Multyfarnham (townland), a townland in Multyfarnham civil parish, barony of Corkaree, County Westmeath

== See also ==
- Multyfarnham Friary
