= Cappagh, County Westmeath =

Cappagh An Cheapach
- Townland
- Location of Cappagh within County Westmeath in the Republic of Ireland
- Coordinates: 53°38′39″N 7°28′30″W
- Country: Ireland
- Province: Leinster
- County: County Westmeath
- Irish grid reference: N347661

Cappagh (Irish: An Cheapach) is a townland in County Westmeath, Ireland. It is located about 15.82 kilometres (10 mi) north–north–west of Mullingar.

Cappagh is one of 9 townlands of the civil parish of Russagh in the barony of Moygoish in the Province of Leinster. The townland covers 1,149.09 acres (4.6502 km^{2}). Cappagh contained a small lake Lough Garr and Crane Island. The area is now drained.

The neighbouring townlands are: Culvin to the north, Garriskil to the north–east, Ballyharney to the east, Grange to the south–east, Carrick and Ballinalack to the south, Joanstown to the south–west and Corrydonnellan and Barratogher to the north–west.

In the 1911 census of Ireland there were 11 houses and 60 inhabitants in the townland.
