= Kenneth Edgeworth =

Irish astronomer (1880–1972)

Kenneth Edgeworth DSO MC
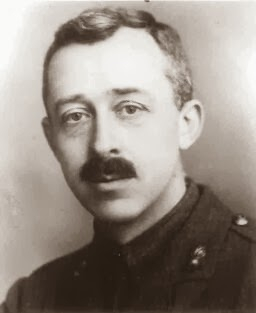
- Born: 26 February 1880
- Died: 10 October 1972 (aged 92)
- Known for: Edgeworth-Kuiper belt
- Notable work: The Evolution of Our Planetary System
- Scientific career
- Fields: astronomy

Kenneth Essex Edgeworth DSO MC (26 February 1880 – 10 October 1972) was an Irish army officer, engineer, economist and independent theoretical astronomer. He was born in Street, County Westmeath. Edgeworth is best known for proposing the existence of a disc of bodies beyond the orbit of Neptune in the 1930s. Observations later confirmed the existence of the Edgeworth-Kuiper belt in 1992. Those distant solar system bodies, including Pluto, Eris and Makemake, are now grouped into the Edgeworth-Kuiper belt, or Kuiper belt.

== Early life ==
Edgeworth was born on 26 February 1880 at Daramona House Street, County Westmeath. His parents were Elizabeth Dupré (née Wilson) and land agent Thomas Newcomen Edgeworth, both of Anglo-Irish ancestry. He was from one of 'the archetypal gentleman literary and scientific families' (McFarland, 1996).

His father's family was from Kilshruley, Ballinalee, County Longford near Edgeworthstown, whose estates were the seats of his ancestors. William Wilson, his uncle on his mother's side and the owner of Daramona House, built an observatory and workshop there and with George Minchin and George Fitzgerald made various types of observations, including pioneering photometric measurements of starlight. Edgeworth's family moved to the estate at Kilshruley four years after his birth. It had 'Grubb 12-inch' and '24-inch reflectors' which his uncle had acquired from Sir Howard Grubb of Dublin a year after he went on an expedition to Algeria to observe the 1870 total eclipse, at just age 19. He remained a regular visitor to the observatory, meeting Wilson's scientific friends George Minchin and George Fitzgerald. His observations included the 1882 transit of Venus. Later in Edgeworth's life he devoted his autobiography to them. It was his uncle who proposed Edgeworth to the Royal Astronomical Society (RAS).

After residing at Daramona, Edgeworth's parents moved to Ardglas House and then to Mount Murray, near Lough Owel. After about four years at Mount Murray, they moved to the family home at Kilshruley, about 7 miles (11 km) miles from Edgeworthstown to join Kenneth Essex's grandfather, the retired clergyman Essex Edgeworth. At Kilshruley, Kenneth Essex developed his engineering skills in his father's well-equipped workshop, building small engines, and also experimenting with fireworks and photography.

== Military career ==
When aged 17, Edgeworth attended the Royal Military Academy, Woolwich, London, where he won the Pollock Medal for best cadet in 1898. He also attended the Royal School of Military Engineering at Chatham and served a commission in the Corps of Royal Engineers in Egypt.

Posted to South Africa, he took part in the Second Boer War and was promoted to lieutenant on 3 July 1901. Following the end of the war he left Cape Town on the SS Englishman in late September 1902, and arrived at Southampton in late October, when he was posted at Chatham. He later served in Somaliland and Dublin. In the First World War he served in Royal Corps of Signals to maintain communications in France, was mentioned in dispatches three times and was awarded the Distinguished Service Order (DSO) and the Military Cross.

== Economic and astronomical career ==
In 1902, Edgeworth's uncle, William E. Wilson, put forward his nephew for election to the Royal Astronomical Society. Edgeworth was elected the following year. At the meeting, one of his papers was read. He studied international economics during the Great Depression and wrote five books about it during the 1930s and 1940s. He also wrote about the use of turf as a fuel.

Influenced by his uncle's former astronomical endeavors, he published scientific papers (at least from 1939) on the Solar System, star formation, red dwarf stars and astronomical redshifts. He said in 1938 that Pluto (discovered eight years earlier by Clyde Tombaugh) was too small to be a planet but was likely a large example of the original material of the Solar System. In the Journal of the British Astronomical Association, he published The Evolution of Our Planetary System in 1943 (the same year that he was elected to the British Astronomical Association (BAA)), with a key reference to a mass of comets existing past Neptune. He was elected to the Royal Irish Academy in 1948. In 1949, he followed his 1943 paper with The Origin and Evolution of the Solar System. He suggested that there was a huge number of small bodies at a great distance, with infrequent clustering limiting their size but the occasional inward cometary visitor. In 1950, Jan Oort published his paper in which the Oort cloud was put forward. A year after that, Gerard Kuiper presented his paper at the 50th-anniversary symposium of Yerkes Observatory. It is not known why he did not refer to Edgeworth's papers. The Edgeworth-Kuiper belt has been most frequently referred to as the Kuiper belt, which has caused a dispute:

From Steven J. Dick, in Discovery and Classification in Astronomy: Controversy and Consensus:
"...others also envisioned trans-Neptunian objects beyond Pluto. As with most Americans, in this book we use the term "Kuiper Belt," demonstrating that if classes and classification systems are socially constructed... nomenclature is even more so."

From Dr. Alan Stern, principal investigator of NASA's New Horizons mission to Pluto, reported in the Irish Times:
"Kenneth Edgeworth probably doesn't get the credit he deserves. In 1943 and 1949 he had papers that were brilliant. He nailed it."

== Later life and death ==
During 1916, Edgeworth took a leave of absence. During this time he met Isabel Mary, the widow of Arthur F. Eves. The pair got engaged and married on 23 August 1917. Edgeworth retired from the military in 1926, as a lieutenant-colonel. Sometime during his military years, he became a member of the Institution of Electrical Engineers. He became the chief engineer in the Sudanese Department of Posts and Telegraphs department for five years in Sudan before finally returning home to Ireland. He also wrote a paper on thermionic generators around this time. In 1931, he returned to his parents' home Cherbury, in Booterstown. In his retirement, Edgeworth published four books on economics and over a 23-year period published a number of letters and papers which culminated in his book The Earth, the Planets and the Stars: Their Birth and Evolution (1961). However, before this publication, in 1943, Edgeworth wrote a piece for the Journal of the British Astronomical Association which suggested the idea of a vast reservoir of cometary material beyond Neptune's orbit. This was later validated as ‘Kuiper's Belt,’ and despite suggesting it in the 1940s, Edgeworth's astronomical findings were not recognised until 1995.

Edgeworth published his autobiography, at age 85, in 1965, Jack of all Trades: The Story of My Life. Kenneth Edgeworth died in Dublin on 10 October 1972, at the age of 92.

== Publications ==
Edgeworth published on topics of engineering, economics and astronomy. His known books and papers include the following:

- Frequency Variations in Thermionic Generators. (London, IEE, 1926)
- The Industrial Crisis, Its Causes and Its Lessons. (London, G. Allen & Unwin Ltd.,1933)
- The Trade Balance; a Problem in National Planning. (London, G. Allen & Unwin Ltd.,1934)
- The Price Level; a Further Problem in National Planning. (London, G. Allen & Unwin Ltd.,1935)
- A Plan for the Distressed Areas. 11pp pamphlet (location/publisher unidentified, 1936)
- The Fission of Rotating Bodies. (London, Monthly Notices of the Royal Astronomical Society, vol.99, 1939)
- The Manufacture of Peat Fuel. (Paper read at the Royal Dublin Society, 26 November 1940)(Dublin, Royal Dublin Society, 1940)
- Unemployment Can be Cured. (Dublin, Eason, 1941; London, distributed by Simpkin & Marshall, 1944)
- Turf. (Dublin, Sign of the Three Candles, 1944)
- Some Aspects of Stellar Evolution [papers I – III] (London, Monthly Notices of the Royal Astronomical Society, vol. 106, 1946)
- Some Aspects of Stellar Evolution [paper IV] (London, Monthly Notices of the Royal Astronomical Society, vol. 108, 1948)
- The Origin and Evolution of the Solar System (London, Monthly Notices of the Royal Astronomical Society, vols. 109, 1949)
- The Earth, the Planets, and the Stars: Their Birth and Evolution. (London, Chapman & Hall/New York, Macmillan,1961)
- Jack of All Trades – The Story of My Life. (Dublin, Alan Figgis, 1965)

== Legacy ==
The asteroid 3487 Edgeworth (1978 UF), a main-belt asteroid discovered on 28 October 1978 by H. L. Giclas at Flagstaff, is named in his honour.

He was honoured again on 3 February 2021 by the International Astronomical Union when the crater Edgeworth on Pluto was named after him .

He left an important legacy in the field of astronomy. In 1943 he proposed a reservoir of icy objects beyond Neptune. Eight years later the astronomer Gerard Kuiper came up with a more detailed prediction. Those distant solar bodies included Pluto, Eris (dwarf planet) and Makemake onto the Kuiper belt. Some astronomers, however, name it the Edgeworth – Kuiper belt. In 1948 he was elected to membership of the Royal Irish Academy, but it was not until 1995 that his research was fully recognised. He was also elected a Fellow of the Royal Astronomical Society in 1903 and belonged to the Institution of Electrical Engineers in 1943.

Edgeworth had such an interest in star formation and the development of the Solar System, he wrote a paper specifically on the "Origin and the Evolution of the Solar System" which continued his research of space research beyond Neptune. More recently, the Edgeworth – Kuiper belt has influenced many astronomers to read more into the demotion of Pluto as a planet.
