= Knockmorris =

Townland in County Westmeath, Ireland

- Townland
- Location of Knockmorris within County Westmeath in the Republic of Ireland
- Coordinates: 53°37′5″N 7°25′48″W
- Country: Ireland
- Province: Leinster
- County: County Westmeath
- Irish grid reference: N377632

Knockmorris is a townland in County Westmeath, Ireland. It is around 12 kilometres (7 mi) north-west of Mullingar.

Knockmorris is one of 10 townlands of the civil parish of Lackan in the barony of Corkaree in the Province of Leinster. The townland covers 38 acres (0.15 km^{2}) and is by far the smallest townland in Lackan parish; excluding the 6 acres of the shared townland of Rathaniska, where the remaining 114 acres of Rathaniska are in Leny civil parish.

The neighbouring townlands are: Fulmort to the east and Leny to the west.
