= Lackan =

Lackan Leacain
- Townland
- Location of Lackan within County Westmeath in the Republic of Ireland
- Coordinates: 53°38′13″N 7°25′27″W
- Country: Ireland
- Province: Leinster
- County: County Westmeath
- Irish grid reference: N381654

Lackan (Irish: Leacain) is a townland in County Westmeath, Ireland. It is located about 13.6 kilometres (8 mi) north-north–west of Mullingar.

Lackan is one of 10 townlands of the civil parish of Lackan in the barony of Corkaree in the Province of Leinster. The townland covers 768 acres (3.11 km^{2}).

The neighbouring townlands are: Clonava and Lackanwood to the north, Donore and Soho to the east, Carrick, Fulmort, Leny and Rathganny to the south and Ballyharney and Grange to the west.

In the 1911 census of Ireland there were 26 houses and 110 inhabitants in the townland.
