= Rathaspick, County Westmeath (civil parish) =

Civil parish in County Westmeath, Ireland

Rathaspick Ráth Easpaig
- Civil parish
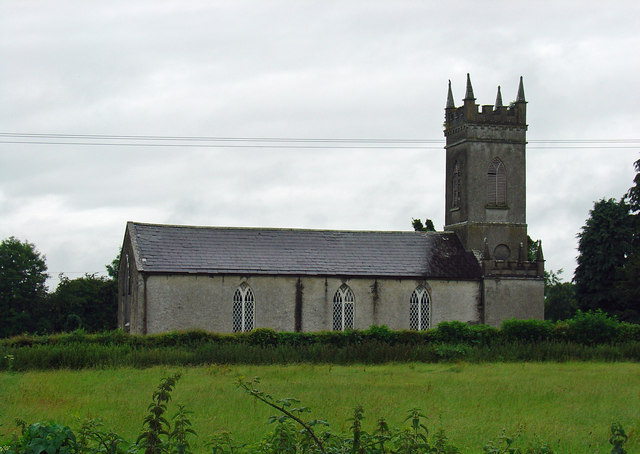
- St Thomas Church, Rathowen

- Location of Rathaspick within County Westmeath, Ireland
- Coordinates: 53°38′25″N 7°32′21″W
- Country: Ireland
- Province: Leinster
- County: County Westmeath
- Irish grid reference: N305656

Rathaspick (Irish: Ráth Easpaig) is a civil parish in County Westmeath, Ireland. It is located about 18 km (11 mi) north–west of Mullingar.

Rathaspick is one of 6 civil parishes in the barony of Moygoish in the province of Leinster. The civil parish covers 7,661.3 acres (31.004 km^{2}).

Rathaspick civil parish comprises the village of Rathowen and 26 townlands: Ballydorey, Ballygarran, Ballygarvey, Ballygarveybeg, Bardanstown, Caraun a.k.a. Kilmacahill, Carrigagh, Clonaboy, Corry, Cross, Crumlin a.k.a. Rockfield, Curristeen, Derrydooan Lower, Derrydooan Middle, Derrydooan Upper, Henfield, Joanstown, Killinagh, Kilmacahill a.k.a. Caraun, Mace, Newpass Demesne, Rathaspick, Rathclittagh, Rathowen, Rathowen (Edward), Rockfield a.k.a. Crumlin, Stongaluggaun and Windtown.

The neighbouring civil parishes are: Russagh to the north, Lackan (barony of Corkaree) to the east, Kilbixy and Kilmacnevan to the south and Ardagh, Mostrim and Rathreagh (all in the barony of Ardagh, County Longford) to the west.
