= Russagh (civil parish) =

Civil parish in County Westmeath, Ireland

Russagh An Rosach
- Civil parish
- Location of Russagh within County Westmeath, Ireland
- Coordinates: 53°39′16″N 7°29′44″W
- Country: Ireland
- Province: Leinster
- County: County Westmeath
- Irish grid reference: N333672

Russagh (Irish: An Rosach) is a civil parish in County Westmeath, Ireland. It is located about 18 km (11 mi) north–west of Mullingar.

Russagh is one of 6 civil parishes in the barony of Moygoish in the Province of Leinster. The civil parish covers 2,581.2 acres (10.446 km^{2}).

Russagh civil parish comprises 9 townlands: Barratogher, Cappagh, Corrydonellan, Loughanstown, Loughanstown Lower aka Slievelahan, Rathowen, Russagh, Slievelahan aka Loughanstown Lower, Windtown North and Windtown South.

The neighbouring civil parishes are: Street to the north, Lackan (barony of Corkaree) to the east, Kilbixy to the south and Mostrim (barony of Ardagh, County Longford and Rathaspick to the west.
