= An tSráid =

An tSráid (Irish for "the street") may refer to several places on the island of Ireland:

- Straid, County Antrim, a village
- Strade, County Mayo, a village
- Street, County Westmeath, a village
  - Street, County Westmeath (civil parish)
