= Garriskil =

- Townland
- Location of Garriskil within County Westmeath in the Republic of Ireland
- Coordinates: 53°39′31″N 7°28′14″W
- Country: Ireland
- Province: Leinster
- County: County Westmeath
- Irish grid reference: N350677

Garriskil is a townland in County Westmeath, Ireland. It is located about 17.04 kilometres (11 mi) north–north–west of Mullingar.

Garriskil is one of 35 townlands of the civil parish of Street in the barony of Moygoish in the Province of Leinster. The townland covers 441.62 acres (1.7872 km^{2}). The southern boundary of the townland is formed by the River Inny.

The neighbouring townlands are: Barradrum to the north, Clonkeen and Monagead to the east, Ballyharney to the south, Cappagh to the south–west and Culvin to the north–west.

In the 1911 census of Ireland there were 4 houses and 22 inhabitants in the townland.
