= Loughanstown =

Loughanstown is a place name and may refer to:

== Places ==
Ireland

- Loughanstown, Caheravally, a townland in the barony of Clanwilliam, County Limerick
- Loughanstown, Delvin, a townland in the civil parish of Delvin, barony of Delvin, County Westmeath
- Loughanstown, Fedamore, a townland in the barony of Clanwilliam, County Limerick
- Loughanstown, Portnashangan, a townland in the barony of Corkaree, County Westmeath
- Loughanstown, Rathfeigh, a townland in the barony of Skreen, County Meath
- Loughanstown, Rathgarve, a townland in the civil parish of Rathgarve, barony of Fore, County Westmeath
- Loughanstown, Russagh, a townland in the civil parish of Russagh, barony of Moygoish, County Westmeath
- Loughanstown Lower (or Slievelahan), a townland in the civil parish of Russagh, barony of Moygoish, County Westmeath

== See also ==
- Loughlinstown
