= Clonkeen, Street =

Townland in County Westmeath, Ireland

Clonkeen
- Townland
- Location of Clonkeen within County Westmeath in the Republic of Ireland
- Coordinates: 53°39′46″N 7°27′17″W
- Country: Ireland
- Province: Leinster
- County: County Westmeath
- Irish grid reference: N360682

Clonkeen is a townland in County Westmeath, Ireland. It is about 17 kilometres (11 mi) north of Mullingar.

Clonkeen is one of 35 townlands of the civil parish of Street in the barony of Moygoish in the Province of Leinster. The townland covers 646.44 acres (2.6160 km^{2}). The south–eastern boundary of the townland is formed by the River Inny.

The neighbouring townlands are: Bottomy to the north and east, Clonava to the south–east, Lackanwood to the south–east, Derradd and Monagead to the south, Garriskil to the west and Barradrum to the north–west.

A railway line carrying the national rail company Iarnród Éireann's Dublin to Longford commuter service and Dublin to Sligo intercity service passes through the townland. The Ordnance Survey map, produced at the time of the Griffith's Valuation survey of Ireland (completed in 1869), shows two lines. The modern-day mainline is shown as the Mullingar and Longford Railway and a branch line to Cavan, no longer in existence, is marked as the Cavan Junction Railway.

In the 1911 census of Ireland there were 5 houses and 21 inhabitants in the townland.
