= Leny (civil parish) =

Civil parish in County Westmeath, Ireland

Leny Léine
- Civil parish
- Location of Leny within County Westmeath in Ireland
- Coordinates: 53°36′22″N 7°25′32″W
- Country: Ireland
- Province: Leinster
- County: County Westmeath
- Irish grid reference: N380619

Leny (Irish: Léine) is a civil parish in County Westmeath, Ireland. It is located about 11 km (7 mi) north–west of Mullingar. This name also applies to the townland of Leny; neither should be confused with the Falls of Leny in Scotland.

Leny is one of 8 civil parishes in the barony of Corkaree in the province of Leinster. The civil parish covers 4,247.8 acres (17.190 km^{2}).

Leny civil parish comprises 15 townlands: Ballinalack (village), Ballinalack, Ballynafid, Ballyvade, Clanhugh Demesne, Culleenabohoge, Culleendarragh, Cullenhugh, Farrow, Glebe, Kilpatrick, Knightswood, Leny, Rathaniska and Rathbennett.

The neighbouring civil parishes are: Russagh, Lackan and Multyfarnham to the north, Tyfarnham to the east, Portloman, Portnashangan and Templeoran to the south and Kilbixy (barony of Moygoish) and Rathaspick (Moygoish) to the west.
