= Ballyharney =

Ballyharney Baile Átha hAirne
- Townland
- Location of Ballyharney within County Westmeath in the Republic of Ireland
- Coordinates: 53°38′27″N 7°26′44″W
- Country: Ireland
- Province: Leinster
- County: County Westmeath

Area
  - Total: 2.39 km^{2} (0.92 sq mi)
- Irish grid reference: N367657

Ballyharney (Irish: Baile Átha hAirne) is a townland in County Westmeath, Ireland. It is located about 14.52 kilometres (9 mi) north-north–west of Mullingar.

Ballyharney is one of 10 townlands of the civil parish of Lackan in the barony of Corkaree in the Province of Leinster. The townland covers 579.35 acres (2.3445 km^{2}).

The neighbouring townlands are: Hospitalbank and Monagead (barony of Moygoish) to the north, Lackanwood to the north–east, Lackan to the east and south, Grange to the south, Cappagh (Moygoish) to the west and Garriskil (Moygoish) to the north–west.

In the 1911 census of Ireland there were 8 houses and 36 inhabitants in the townland.
