= Abbeyland, County Westmeath =

Abbeyland
- Townland
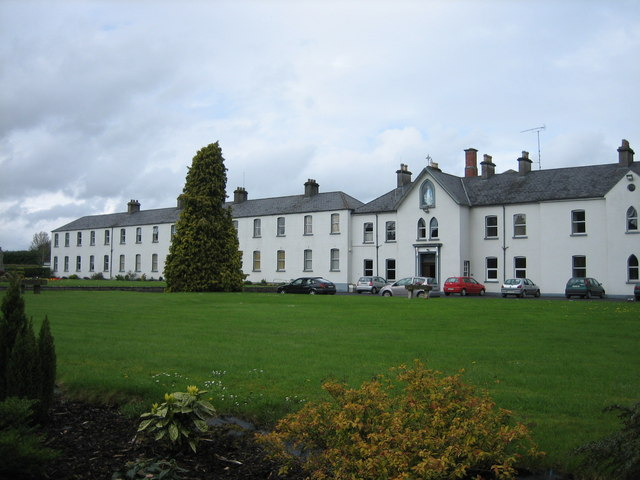
- Franciscan friary in Abbeyland

- Location of Abbeyland within County Westmeath in the Republic of Ireland
- Coordinates: 53°37′51″N 7°20′49″W
- Country: Ireland
- Province: Leinster
- County: County Westmeath
- Irish grid reference: N400644

Abbeyland is a townland in County Westmeath, Ireland. It is located about 12 kilometres (7 mi) north of Mullingar.

Abbeyland is one of 14 townlands of the civil parish of Multyfarnham in the barony of Corkaree in the Province of Leinster. The townland covers 76.22 acres (0.3085 km^{2}).

The neighbouring townlands are: Multyfarnham to the north and east Rathganny to the south and Ballynaclonagh to the west and north–west.

In the 1911 census of Ireland there were 2 listings for Multyfarnham Friary in Abbeyland; one for 11 Franciscan clergymen and lay-brothers and one for 20 students aged between 14 and 22 years.
