= Rathlevanagh =

Townland in County Westmeath, Ireland

- Townland
- Location of Rathlevanagh within County Westmeath in the Republic of Ireland
- Coordinates: 53°35′30″N 7°21′28″W
- Country: Ireland
- Province: Leinster
- County: County Westmeath
- Irish grid reference: N423603

Rathlevanagh is a townland in County Westmeath, Ireland. It is located about 7.5 kilometres (5 mi) north of Mullingar.

Rathlevanagh is one of 8 townlands of the civil parish of Portnashangan in the barony of Corkaree in the Province of Leinster. The townland covers 256 acres (1.04 km^{2}).

The neighbouring townlands are: Down and Knightswood to the north, Loughanstown to the east and Portnashangan to the west.

In the 1911 census of Ireland there were 2 houses and 5 inhabitants in the townland.
