= Glebe, Leny =

Glebe
- Townland
- Location of Glebe within County Westmeath in the Republic of Ireland
- Coordinates: 53°37′3″N 7°28′16″W
- Country: Ireland
- Province: Leinster
- County: County Westmeath
- Irish grid reference: N352636

Glebe is a townland in County Westmeath, Ireland. It is located about 14.5 kilometres (9 mi) north–west of Mullingar.

Glebe is one of 15 townlands of the civil parish of Leny in the barony of Corkaree in the Province of Leinster. The townland covers 35 acres (0.14 km^{2}) and is easily the smallest townland in Leny civil parish. The neighbouring townlands are: Ballinalack to the north and Cullenhugh to the south.

In the 1911 census of Ireland there was 1 house and 4 inhabitants in the townland.

Glebe was the name given to an area of land within an ecclesiastical parish used to support a parish priest. As a townland name it is repeated many times across the country.
