= Clanhugh Demesne =

Clanhugh Demesne Diméin Chlann Aodha
- Townland
- Location of Clanhugh Demesne within County Westmeath in the Republic of Ireland
- Coordinates: 53°35′42″N 7°23′53″W
- Country: Ireland
- Province: Leinster
- County: County Westmeath
- Irish grid reference: N399607

Clanhugh Demesne (Irish: Diméin Chlann Aodha) is a townland in County Westmeath, Ireland. It is located about 9 kilometres (6 mi) north–west of Mullingar.

Clanhugh Demesne is one of 15 townlands of the civil parish of Leny in the barony of Corkaree in the Province of Leinster. The townland covers 367 acres (1.49 km^{2}) of which 291 acres (1.18 km^{2}) are in Leny civil parish and 76 acres (0.31 km^{2}) are in nearby Portnashangan civil parish. The neighbouring townlands are: Ballynafid to the east and Kilpatrick to the west.

In the 1911 census of Ireland there were 8 houses and 41 inhabitants in the townland.

Clonhugh House, built in 1867 for Colonel Fulke Greville, was constructed on the site of an earlier building, also called Clonhugh House, demolished to make way for the new structure.
