= Farrow, County Westmeath =

Farrow
- Townland
- Location of Farrow within County Westmeath in the Republic of Ireland
- Coordinates: 53°36′14″N 7°27′37″W
- Country: Ireland
- Province: Leinster
- County: County Westmeath
- Irish grid reference: N358617

Farrow is a townland in County Westmeath, Ireland. It is located about 11.65 kilometres (7 mi) north–west of Mullingar. This place name is not to be confused with Farra which is in the neighbouring townland of Rathbennett or Barr of Farrow which is a townland in County Leitrim.

Farrow is one of 15 townlands of the civil parish of Leny in the barony of Corkaree in the Province of Leinster. The townland covers 365 acres (1.48 km^{2}). The neighbouring townlands are: Ballyvade and Cullenhugh to the north, Rathaniska and Rathbennett to the east and Grange, Piercefield and Piercefield (or Templeoran) to the south. The south–west boundary of the townland borders the shore of Lough Iron.

In the 1911 census of Ireland there were 2 houses and 6 inhabitants in the townland.
