= Lackanwood =

Lackanwood Coill Leacan
- Townland
- Location of Lackanwood within County Westmeath in the Republic of Ireland
- Coordinates: 53°38′58″N 7°25′36″W
- Country: Ireland
- Province: Leinster
- County: County Westmeath
- Irish grid reference: N379667

Lackanwood (Irish: Coill Leacan) is a townland in County Westmeath, Ireland. It is located about 14.87 kilometres (9 mi) north-north–west of Mullingar.

Lackanwood is one of 10 townlands of the civil parish of Lackan in the barony of Corkaree in the Province of Leinster. The townland covers 314.45 acres (1.2725 km^{2}).

The neighbouring townlands are: Clonkeen to the north, Clonava to the north–east, Lackan to the south–east, Ballyharney to the south–west, Hospitalbank to the west and Derradd to the north–west.

In the 1911 census of Ireland there were 10 houses and 49 inhabitants in the townland.
