= Multyfarnham (townland) =

- Townland
- Location of Multyfarnham townland within County Westmeath in the Republic of Ireland
- Coordinates: 53°37′39″N 7°23′3″W
- Country: Ireland
- Province: Leinster
- County: County Westmeath
- Irish grid reference: N407643

Multyfarnham is a townland in County Westmeath, Ireland. It is located about 11.7 kilometres (7 mi) north of Mullingar.

Multyfarnham is one of 14 townlands of the civil parish of Multyfarnham in the barony of Corkaree in the Province of Leinster. The townland covers 185 acres (0.75 km^{2}).

The neighbouring townlands are: Donore and Froghanstown to the north, Lismalady to the north and east, Multyfarnham or Fearbranagh and Ballindurrow to the south and Rathganny, Abbeyland and Ballynaclonagh to the west.

In the 1911 census of Ireland there were 17 houses and 65 inhabitants in the townland.
