= Culleenabohoge =

- Townland
- Location of Culleenabohoge within County Westmeath in the Republic of Ireland
- Coordinates: 53°36′29″N 7°22′37″W
- Country: Ireland
- Province: Leinster
- County: County Westmeath

Area
  - Total: 1.13 km^{2} (0.44 sq mi)
- Irish grid reference: N413622

Culleenabohoge is a townland in County Westmeath, Ireland. It is located about 9.7 kilometres (6 mi) north–north–west of Mullingar.

Culleenabohoge is one of 15 townlands of the civil parish of Leny in the barony of Corkaree in the Province of Leinster. The townland covers 287 acres (1.16 km^{2}). The neighbouring townlands are: Ballindurrow and Multyfarnham or Fearbranagh to the north, Tyfarnham to the east, Ballynafid and Knightswood to the south and Culleendarragh to the west.

In the 1911 census of Ireland there were 4 houses and 22 inhabitants in the townland.
