= Monagead =

Townland in County Westmeath, Ireland

- Townland
- Location of Monagead within County Westmeath in the Republic of Ireland
- Coordinates: 53°39′1″N 7°27′3″W
- Country: Ireland
- Province: Leinster
- County: County Westmeath
- Irish grid reference: N363668

Monagead is a townland in County Westmeath, Ireland, 16 kilometres (10 mi) north–west of Mullingar.

Monagead is one of 35 townlands of the civil parish of Street in the barony of Moygoish in the Province of Leinster. The townland covers 162.67 acres (0.6583 km^{2}).

== Geography ==
The southern boundary of the townland is formed by the River Inny.

The neighbouring townlands are: Clonkeen and Derradd to the north, Hospitalbank to the east, Ballyharney to the south and Garriskil to the west.

== Population ==
In the 1911 census of Ireland there was 1 house and 1 inhabitant in the townland.
