= Derradd =

Townland in County Westmeath, Ireland

- Townland
- Location of Derradd within County Westmeath in the Republic of Ireland
- Coordinates: 53°39′27″N 7°26′37″W
- Country: Ireland
- Province: Leinster
- County: County Westmeath
- Irish grid reference: N368676

Derradd is a townland in County Westmeath, Ireland, 16 km (10 mi) north–west of Mullingar.

Derradd is one of 35 townlands of the civil parish of Street in the barony of Moygoish in the Province of Leinster. The townland covers 284.61 acres (1.1518 km^{2}) and the eastern boundary is formed by the River Inny.

The neighbouring townlands are: Clonkeen to the north and west, Lackanwood to the south–east and Hospitalbank and Monagead to the south.

The Dublin–Sligo railway line of the national rail company Iarnród Éireann, carrying the Dublin to Longford commuter service and the Dublin to Sligo intercity service, passes through the townland. The Ordnance Survey map, produced at the time of the Griffith's Valuation survey of Ireland (completed in 1869), shows a junction of two lines. The modern-day mainline is shown as the Mullingar and Longford Railway, the branch line to Cavan is marked as the Cavan Junction Railway and the station is shown as Cavan or Derradd Junction.

In the 1911 census of Ireland there were 5 houses and 33 inhabitants in the townland. Six of the residents were railway employees.
