= Tober, County Westmeath =

Tober An Tobar
- Townland
- Location of Tober within County Westmeath in the Republic of Ireland
- Coordinates: 53.6363°N 7.3713°W
- Country: Ireland
- Province: Leinster
- County: County Westmeath
- Irish grid reference: N416652

Tober (Irish: An Tobar, meaning 'well or spring') is a townland in County Westmeath, Ireland. It is located about 12.45 kilometres (8 mi) north of Mullingar.

Tober is one of 14 townlands of the civil parish of Multyfarnham in the barony of Corkaree in the Province of Leinster. The townland covers 212.05 acres (0.8581 km^{2}).

The neighbouring townlands are Ballynakill to the north–east, Ballinphort to the east and south, Lismalady to the south, Froghanstown to the south–west and Donore to the north–west.

In the 1911 census of Ireland there were 2 houses and 7 inhabitants in the townland.
