= Ballindurrow =

- Townland
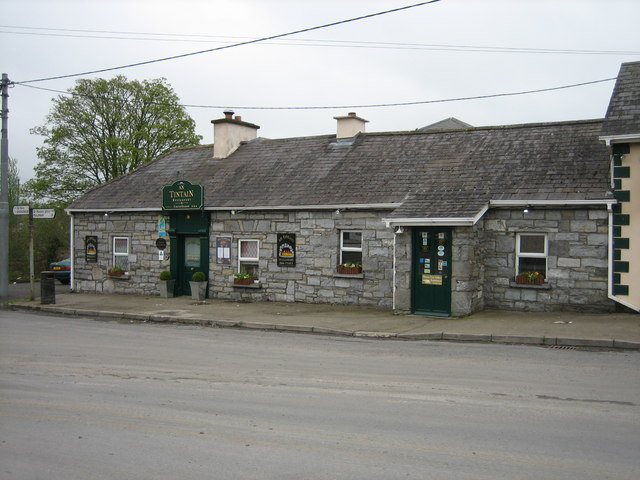
- An Tintain, guest house and restaurant in Ballindurrow, Multyfarnham parish

- Location of Ballindurrow within County Westmeath in the Republic of Ireland
- Coordinates: 53°37′1″N 7°23′22″W
- Country: Ireland
- Province: Leinster
- County: County Westmeath

Area
  - Total: 1.77 km^{2} (0.68 sq mi)
- Irish grid reference: N404631

Ballindurrow is a townland in County Westmeath, Ireland. It is located about 10.65 kilometres (7 mi) north of Mullingar.

Ballindurrow is one of 14 townlands of the civil parish of Multyfarnham in the barony of Corkaree in the Province of Leinster. The townland covers 426.66 acres (1.7266 km^{2}).

The neighbouring townlands are: Multyfarnham to the north, Fearbranagh or Multyfarnham and Culleenabohoge to the east, Culleendarragh to the south and Heathland and Rathganny to the west.

In the 1911 census of Ireland there were 17 houses and 95 inhabitants in the townland.
