= Ballynaclonagh =

- Townland
- Location of Ballynaclonagh within County Westmeath in the Republic of Ireland
- Coordinates: 53°37′57″N 7°24′15″W
- Country: Ireland
- Province: Leinster
- County: County Westmeath
- Irish grid reference: N394648

Ballynaclonagh is a townland in County Westmeath, Ireland. It is located about 11.78 kilometres (7 mi) north of Mullingar.

Ballynaclonagh is one of 14 townlands of the civil parish of Multyfarnham in the barony of Corkaree in the Province of Leinster. The townland covers 269.27 acres (1.0897 km^{2}).

The neighbouring townlands are: Donore to the north–east, Abbeyland to the east, Multyfarnham to the east, Rathganny to the south and Soho to the west and north.

In the 1911 census of Ireland there were 2 houses and 10 inhabitants in the townland.
