= Ballynagall, County Westmeath =

Ballynagall
- Townland
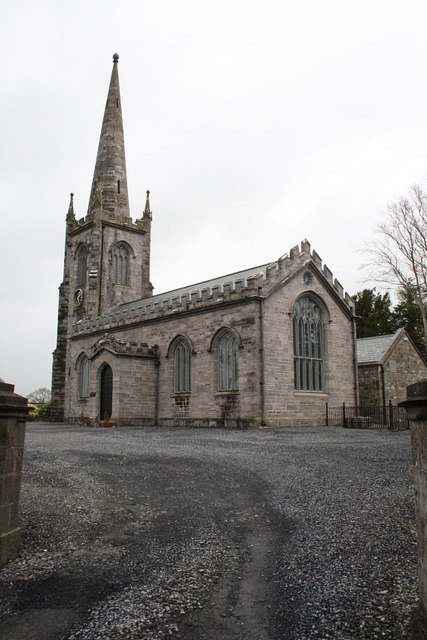
- Former Ballynagall Chapel

- Location of Ballynagall within County Westmeath in the Republic of Ireland
- Coordinates: 53°34′38″N 7°20′31″W
- Country: Ireland
- Province: Leinster
- County: County Westmeath
- Irish grid reference: N 436587

Ballynagall is a townland in County Westmeath, Ireland. It is located about 5.82 kilometres (4 mi) north of Mullingar.

Ballynagall is one of 8 townlands of the civil parish of Portnashangan, and 11 townlands of the civil parish of Tyfarnham, both in the barony of Corkaree in the Province of Leinster. The townland covers 829 acres (3.35 km^{2}), of which 813 acres (3.29 km^{2}) are in Portnashangan civil parish and 16 acres (0.065 km^{2}) are in Tyfarnham. The southern boundary of the townland includes part of Scragh Bog. The north–west boundary of the townland follows the River Gaine, a tributary of the River Inny.

The neighbouring townlands are: Garrysallagh and Loughanstown to the north, Cartron, Kilmaglish, Knockdrin Demesne and Quarry to the east, Brockagh to the south and Culleen More and Portnashangan to the west.

In the 1911 census of Ireland there were 21 houses and 92 inhabitants in the townland.

== Buildings ==
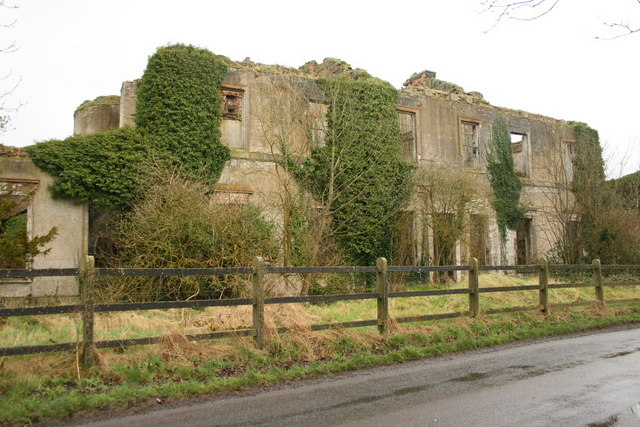
Ruin of Ballynegall House

Ballynegall House, a former country house located in the townland, has fallen into ruins since 1981.

The former Ballynagall Chapel in the southeast of the townland is now used as a restaurant.
