= Leny, County Westmeath =

Leny Léine
- Townland
- Location of Leny within County Westmeath in the Republic of Ireland
- Coordinates: 53°37′1″N 7°26′27″W
- Country: Ireland
- Province: Leinster
- County: County Westmeath
- Irish grid reference: N371631

Leny (Irish: Léine) is a townland in County Westmeath, Ireland. It is located about 12 kilometres (7 mi) north–west of Mullingar. This name also applies to the civil parish of Leny. Not to be confused with the Falls of Leny in Scotland.

Leny is one of 10 townlands of the civil parish of Lackan and one of 15 townlands of the civil parish of Leny, both in the barony of Corkaree in the Province of Leinster. The townland covers 456 acres (1.85 km^{2}) of which 294 acres (1.19 km^{2}) are in Lackan parish and 163 acres (0.66 km^{2}) are in Leny parish. The neighbouring townlands are: Carrick and Lackan to the north, Fulmort, Heathland, Kilpatrick and Knockmorris to the east, Rathaniska and Rathbennett to the south and Ballyvade and Cullenhugh to the west.

In the 1911 census of Ireland, there were 6 houses and 40 inhabitants in the townland.
