= Rathbennett =

- Townland
- Location of Rathbennett within County Westmeath in the Republic of Ireland
- Coordinates: 53°36′8″N 7°26′18″W
- Country: Ireland
- Province: Leinster
- County: County Westmeath
- Irish grid reference: N372615

Rathbennett is a townland in County Westmeath, Ireland. It is located about 11 kilometres (7 mi) north–west of Mullingar.

Rathbennett is one of 15 townlands of the civil parish of Leny in the barony of Corkaree in the Province of Leinster. The townland covers 333 acres (1.35 km^{2}). The neighbouring townlands are: Leny and Rathaniska to the north, Kilpatrick to the east, Mountmurray and Piercefield to the south and Farrow to the west.

In the 1911 census of Ireland there were 11 houses and 44 inhabitants in the townland.
