= Ballinphort =

- Townland
- Location of Ballinphort within County Westmeath in the Republic of Ireland
- Coordinates: 53°38′10″N 7°21′18″W
- Country: Ireland
- Province: Leinster
- County: County Westmeath
- Irish grid reference: N427653

Ballinphort is a townland in County Westmeath, Ireland. It is located about 12.38 kilometres (8 mi) north of Mullingar.

Ballinphort is one of 14 townlands of the civil parish of Multyfarnham in the barony of Corkaree in the Province of Leinster. The townland covers 318.70 acres (1.2897 km^{2}).

The neighbouring townlands are: Ballynakill to the north–west, Ballinriddera to the south–east, Lismalady to the south–west and Tober to the west.

In the 1911 census of Ireland there were 3 houses and 19 inhabitants in the townland.
