= Lismalady =

- Townland
- Location of Lismalady within County Westmeath in the Republic of Ireland
- Coordinates: 53°37′41″N 7°22′9″W
- Country: Ireland
- Province: Leinster
- County: County Westmeath
- Irish grid reference: N417644

Lismalady is a townland in County Westmeath, Ireland. It is located about 11.58 kilometres (7 mi) north of Mullingar.

Lismalady is one of 14 townlands of the civil parish of Multyfarnham in the barony of Corkaree in the Province of Leinster. The townland covers 153.69 acres (0.6220 km^{2}).

The neighbouring townlands are: Tober to the north, Ballinphort to the north–east, Ballinriddera to the east, Killintown to the south–east, Multyfarnham or Fearbranagh to the south, Froghanstown to the west and Multyfarnham (townland) to the west.

In the 1911 census of Ireland there were 6 houses and 19 inhabitants in the townland.
