= Culleendarragh =

- Townland
- Location of Culleendarragh within County Westmeath in the Republic of Ireland
- Coordinates: 53°36′32″N 7°23′37″W
- Country: Ireland
- Province: Leinster
- County: County Westmeath

Area
  - Total: 0.85 km^{2} (0.33 sq mi)
- Irish grid reference: N402623

Culleendarragh is a townland in County Westmeath, Ireland. It is located about 10 kilometres (6 mi) north–north–west of Mullingar.

Culleendarragh is one of 15 townlands of the civil parish of Leny in the barony of Corkaree in the Province of Leinster. The townland covers 210 acres (0.85 km^{2}). The neighbouring townlands are: Ballindurrow to the north, Culleenabohoge to the east, Ballynafid and Knightswood to the south and Heathland to the west.

In the 1911 census of Ireland there were 4 houses and 17 inhabitants in the townland.
