= Knightswood (disambiguation) =

Knightswood is a suburban district in Glasgow.

Knightswood may also refer to:

== Places ==
Republic of Ireland

- Knightswood, County Westmeath, a townland in Leny civil parish, barony of Corkaree, County Westmeath

== See also ==
- Knightswood Secondary School
- Knightswood St Margaret's Parish Church
