= Ballynakill, Multyfarnham =

Ballynakill
- Townland
- Location of Ballynakill within County Westmeath in the Republic of Ireland
- Coordinates: 53°38′36″N 7°21′49″W
- Country: Ireland
- Province: Leinster
- County: County Westmeath
- Irish grid reference: N421661

Ballynakill is a townland in County Westmeath, Ireland. It is located about 13.23 kilometres (8 mi) north of Mullingar on the western shore of Lough Derravaragh.

Ballynakill is one of 14 townlands of the civil parish of Multyfarnham in the barony of Corkaree in the Province of Leinster. The townland covers 294.07 acres (1.1901 km^{2}).

The neighbouring townlands are: Ballinphort to the east, Tober to the south and Donore to the west.

In the 1911 census of Ireland there were 4 houses and 22 inhabitants in the townland.
