= Rathganny =

- Townland
- Location of Rathganny within County Westmeath in the Republic of Ireland
- Coordinates: 53°37′18″N 7°24′27″W
- Country: Ireland
- Province: Leinster
- County: County Westmeath
- Irish grid reference: N392636

Rathganny is a townland in County Westmeath, Ireland. It is located about 11.54 kilometres (7 mi) north-north–west of Mullingar.

Rathganny is one of 14 townlands of the civil parish of Multyfarnham in the barony of Corkaree in the Province of Leinster. The townland covers 498 acres (2.02 km^{2}).

The neighbouring townlands are: Ballynaclonagh, Lackan and Soho to the north, Abbeyland, Ballindurrow, Multyfarnham and Multyfarnham or Fearbranagh to the east, Heathland to the south and Fulmort to the west.

In the 1911 census of Ireland there were 20 houses and 83 inhabitants in the townland.
