= Fulmort =

- Townland
- Location of Fulmort within County Westmeath in the Republic of Ireland
- Coordinates: 53°37′20″N 7°25′27″W
- Country: Ireland
- Province: Leinster
- County: County Westmeath
- Irish grid reference: N382637

Fulmort is a townland in County Westmeath, Ireland. It is located about 12 kilometres (7 mi) north-north–west of Mullingar.

Fulmort is one of 10 townlands of the civil parish of Lackan in the barony of Corkaree in the Province of Leinster. The townland covers 362 acres (1.46 km^{2}).

The neighbouring townlands are: Lackan to the north, Rathganny to the east and Heathland, Kilpatrick, Knockmorris and Leny to the south.

In the 1911 census of Ireland there were 12 houses and 43 inhabitants in the townland.
