= Froghanstown, Multyfarnham =

Froghanstown
- Townland
- Location of Froghanstown within County Westmeath in the Republic of Ireland
- Coordinates: 53°38′29″N 7°23′11″W
- Country: Ireland
- Province: Leinster
- County: County Westmeath
- Irish grid reference: N410647

Froghanstown is a townland in County Westmeath, Ireland. It is located about 12.01 kilometres (7 mi) north of Mullingar.

Froghanstown is one of 14 townlands of the civil parish of Multyfarnham in the barony of Corkaree in the Province of Leinster. The townland covers 72.32 acres (0.2927 km^{2}).

The neighbouring townlands are: Tober to the north–east, Lismalady to the east, Multyfarnham to the south and Donore to the west.

In the 1911 census of Ireland there were 2 houses and 6 inhabitants in the townland.
