= Donore =

Donore may refer to the following places in Ireland:

- Donore, County Meath, village near the Louth border
- Donore, County Westmeath, a townland in Multyfarnham civil parish
- Donore, Dublin, area of the Liberties, formerly a barony.
