= Grange, Lackan =

Grange
- Townland
- Location of Grange within County Westmeath in the Republic of Ireland
- Coordinates: 53°37′51″N 7°27′6″W
- Country: Ireland
- Province: Leinster
- County: County Westmeath
- Irish grid reference: N363646

Grange is a townland in County Westmeath, Ireland. It is located about 13.74 kilometres (9 mi) north-north–west of Mullingar.

Grange is one of 10 townlands of the civil parish of Lackan in the barony of Corkaree in the Province of Leinster. The townland covers 208 acres (0.84 km^{2}).

The neighbouring townlands are: Ballyharney to the north, Lackan to the east, Carrick to the south and Ballinalack and Cappagh to the west.

In the 1911 census of Ireland there were 3 houses and 18 inhabitants in the townland.

== See also ==
There are two other townlands called Grange in County Westmeath:

- Grange, Kilbixy
- Grange, Kilcumreragh
