= Grange, Kilbixy =

Townland in County Westmeath, Ireland

Grange
- Townland
- Location of Grange within County Westmeath in the Republic of Ireland
- Coordinates: 53°35′21″N 7°28′39″W
- Country: Ireland
- Province: Leinster
- County: County Westmeath
- Irish grid reference: N347600

Grange is a townland in County Westmeath, Ireland. It is located about 11.3 kilometres (7 mi) north–west of Mullingar.

Grange is one of 22 townlands of the civil parish of Kilbixy in the barony of Moygoish in the Province of Leinster. The townland covers 330 acres (1.3 km^{2}). The neighbouring townlands are: Tristernagh Demesne to the north, Farrow to the east, Piercefield or Templeoran to the east, Ballyhug to the south and Ballyhoreen and Tristernagh to the west.

In the 1911 census of Ireland there were 11 houses and 48 inhabitants in the townland.

== See also ==
There are two other townlands called Grange in County Westmeath:

- Grange, Kilcumreragh
- Grange, Lackan
