= Ballyvade =

Townland in County Westmeath, Ireland

- Townland
- Location of Ballyvade within County Westmeath in the Republic of Ireland
- Coordinates: 53°36′40″N 7°27′15″W
- Country: Ireland
- Province: Leinster
- County: County Westmeath

Area
  - Total: 0.9 km^{2} (0.35 sq mi)
- Irish grid reference: N362625

Ballyvade is a townland in County Westmeath, Ireland. It is located about 12.3 kilometres (8 mi) north–west of Mullingar.

Ballyvade is one of 15 townlands of the civil parish of Leny in the barony of Corkaree in the Province of Leinster. The townland covers 224 acres (0.91 km^{2}). The neighbouring townlands are: Cullenhugh and Leny to the north, Rathaniska to the east and Farrow to the south and west.

In the 1911 census of Ireland there was 1 house and 5 inhabitants in the townland.
