= Portnashangan =

Portnashangan Port na Seangán
- Townland
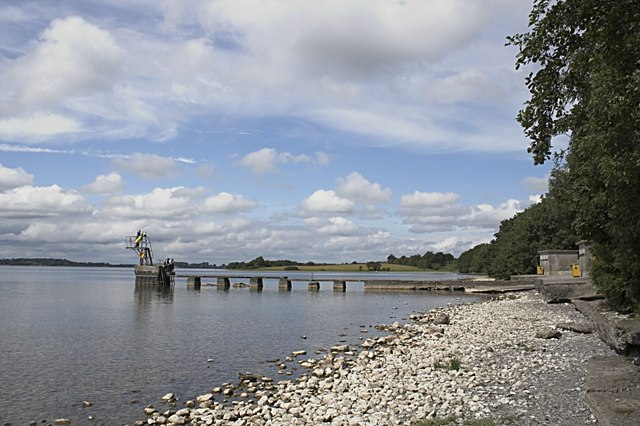
- Jetty in Portnashangan townland at the eastern shore of Lough Owel

- Location of Portnashangan within County Westmeath in the Republic of Ireland
- Coordinates: 53°35′1″N 7°22′25″W
- Country: Ireland
- Province: Leinster
- County: County Westmeath
- Irish grid reference: N415594

Portnashangan (Irish: Port na Seangán) is a townland in County Westmeath, Ireland. It is located about 6.81 kilometres (4 mi) north–north–west of Mullingar.

Portnashangan is one of 8 townlands of the civil parish of Portnashangan in the barony of Corkaree in the Province of Leinster. The townland covers 498 acres (2.02 km^{2}). About half of the eastern boundary of the townland includes a strip of Scragh Bog approximately 50m wide.

The neighbouring townlands are: Ballynafid, Knightswood and Rathlevanagh to the north, Loughanstown to the east and Ballynagall, County Westmeath|]] and Culleen More to the south.

In the 1911 census of Ireland there were 17 houses and 67 inhabitants in the townland.
