= Hospitalbank =

- Townland
- Location of Hospitalbank within County Westmeath in the Republic of Ireland
- Coordinates: 53°39′5″N 7°26′24″W
- Country: Ireland
- Province: Leinster
- County: County Westmeath
- Irish grid reference: N370669

Hospitalbank is a townland in County Westmeath, Ireland. It is located about 15.41 kilometres (10 mi) north-north-west of Mullingar.

Hospitalbank is one of 35 townlands of the civil parish of Street in the barony of Moygoish in the Province of Leinster. The townland covers 66.68 acres (0.2698 km^{2}). The southeastern boundary of the townland is formed by the River Inny.

The neighbouring townlands are Derradd to the north, Lackanwood to the east, Ballyharney to the south and Monagead to the west.

In the 1911 census of Ireland there were 3 houses and 14 inhabitants in the townland.
