= Rathdown =

Rathdown may refer to:

- Rathdown (County Dublin barony) an Irish administrative barony which gives its name to:
  - Dublin Rathdown, a Dáil constituency
  - Dún Laoghaire–Rathdown, a county in Ireland
  - Baron Rathdown, a title in the Peerage of Ireland
- Rathdown, County Wicklow, an Irish administrative barony

== Similar spelling ==
- Rathdowney, County Laois, Ireland
- Rathowen, County Westmeath, Ireland
