= Clonava =

Clonava Cluain Ámha
- Townland
- Location of Clonava within County Westmeath in the Republic of Ireland
- Coordinates: 53°39′55″N 7°24′59″W
- Country: Ireland
- Province: Leinster
- County: County Westmeath
- Irish grid reference: N386685

Clonava (Irish: Cluain Ámha) is a townland in County Westmeath, Ireland. It is located about 16.31 kilometres (10 mi) north of county town Mullingar.

Clonava is one of 35 townlands of the civil parish of Street in the barony of Moygoish in the Province of Leinster. The townland covers 1,125 acres (4.55 km^{2}), including 35 acres (0.14 km^{2}) of water; part of the western end of Lough Derravaragh and the majority of the small lake, Lough Ruddan. The townland contains the settlement of Clonave. North of Lough Derravaragh, the River Inny forms the eastern boundary of the townland. Peat is extracted from wetlands that cover the north of Clonava and parts of neighbouring townlands.

The neighbouring townlands are: Coolnagun to the north, Shrubbywood to the north–east. Derrya to the east, Lackan and Lackanwood to the south and Clonkeen and Bottomy to the west.

In the 1911 census of Ireland there were 15 houses and 63 inhabitants in the townland.
