= Rathaspick =

Rathaspick is a place name and may refer to:

== Places ==
Ireland

- Rathaspick, County Laois, a townland
- Rathaspick, County Laois (civil parish), a civil parish in the barony of Ballyadams
- Rathaspick, County Westmeath, a townland
- Rathaspick, County Westmeath (civil parish), a civil parish in the barony of Moygoish
- Rathaspick, County Wexford, a townland
- Rathaspick, County Wexford (civil parish), a civil parish in the barony of Forth
