= Joanstown =

Townland in County Westmeath, Ireland

- Townland
- Location of Joanstown within County Westmeath in the Republic of Ireland
- Coordinates: 53°38′3″N 7°29′44″W
- Country: Ireland
- Province: Leinster
- County: County Westmeath
- Irish grid reference: N334650

Joanstown is a townland in County Westmeath, Ireland, 16 kilometres (10 mi) north–west of Mullingar.

Joanstown is one of 26 townlands of the civil parish of Rathaspick in the barony of Moygoish in the Province of Leinster. The townland covers 1,467.20 acres (5.9375 km^{2}). The neighbouring townlands are: Corrydonnellan to the north, Cappagh to the north–east, Ballinalack to the east, Cullenhugh to the south–east, Baronstown Demesne and Corry to the south, Kilmacahill or Caraun and Rathowen (Edward) to the west and Rathowen and Russagh to the north–west.

In the 1911 census of Ireland, there were 16 houses and 58 inhabitants in the townland.
