= Heathland, County Westmeath =

Heathland
- Townland
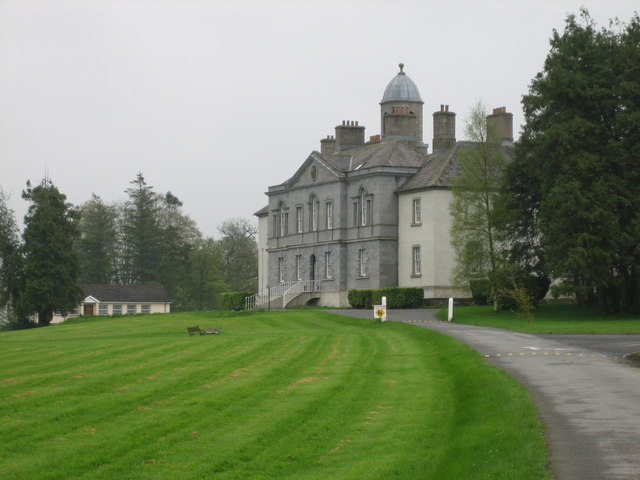
- Wilson's Hospital School, Heathland

- Location of Heathland within County Westmeath in the Republic of Ireland
- Coordinates: 53°36′37″N 7°24′44″W
- Country: Ireland
- Province: Leinster
- County: County Westmeath
- Irish grid reference: N389624

Heathland is a townland in County Westmeath, Ireland. It is located about 10.5 kilometres (7 mi) north-north–west of Mullingar.

Heathland is one of 10 townlands of the civil parish of Lackan in the barony of Corkaree in the Province of Leinster. The townland covers 257 acres (1.04 km^{2}).

The neighbouring townlands are: Rathganny to the north, Ballindurrow and Culleendarragh to the east, Ballynafid and Kilpatrick to the south and Fulmort and Leny to the west.

In the 1911 census of Ireland there were 7 houses and 88 inhabitants in the townland. This includes Wilson's Hospital School.
