= Kilpatrick, Leny =

Kilpatrick Cill Phádraig
- Townland
- Location of Kilpatrick within County Westmeath in the Republic of Ireland
- Coordinates: 53°36′11″N 7°25′15″W
- Country: Ireland
- Province: Leinster
- County: County Westmeath
- Irish grid reference: N384616

Kilpatrick (Irish: Cill Phádraig) is a townland in County Westmeath, Ireland. It is located about 10 kilometres (6 mi) north-west of Mullingar. The name Kilpatrick also applies to four other townlands in County Westmeath.

Kilpatrick is one of 15 townlands of the civil parish of Leny, in the barony of Corkaree in the Province of Leinster. The townland covers 472 acres (1.91 km^{2}). The neighbouring townlands are: Fulmort, Heathland and Leny to the north, Ballynafid and Clanhugh Demesne to the east, Mountmurray to the south and Rathbennett to the west. The south-east boundary of the townland is formed by part of the shoreline of Lough Owel.

In the 1911 census of Ireland there were 12 houses and 42 inhabitants in the townland.
