= Cullenhugh =

- Townland
- Location of Ballyvade within County Westmeath in the Republic of Ireland
- Coordinates: 53°37′3″N 7°28′16″W
- Country: Ireland
- Province: Leinster
- County: County Westmeath
- Irish grid reference: N351633

Cullenhugh is a townland in County Westmeath, Ireland. It is located about 13.5 kilometres (8 mi) north–west of Mullingar on the northeastern shore of Lough Iron. The River Inny forms its northwestern boundary.

Cullenhugh is one of 15 townlands of the civil parish of Leny in the barony of Corkaree in the Province of Leinster. The townland covers 389 acres (1.57 km^{2}). The neighbouring townlands are: Ballinalack, Carrick and Glebe to the north, Ballyvade and Leny to the east, Farrow to the south and Joanstown to the west.

In the 1911 census of Ireland there were 5 houses and 25 inhabitants in the townland.
