= Soho, County Westmeath =

Soho
- Townland
- Location of Soho within County Westmeath in the Republic of Ireland
- Coordinates: 53°38′5″N 7°24′39″W
- Country: Ireland
- Province: Leinster
- County: County Westmeath
- Irish grid reference: N390651

Soho is a townland in County Westmeath, Ireland. It is located about 12.97 kilometres (8 mi) north-north–west of Mullingar.

Soho is one of 14 townlands of the civil parish of Multyfarnham in the barony of Corkaree in the Province of Leinster. The townland covers 111.65 acres (0.4518 km^{2}).

The neighbouring townlands are: Donore to the north, Ballynaclonagh to the east, Rathganny to the south and Lackan to the west.

In the 1911 census of Ireland there was 1 house and 9 inhabitants in the townland. This was Soho House, built c. 1830.
