= Ballynafid =

Ballynafid Baile na Feide
- Townland
- Location of Ballynafid within County Westmeath in the Republic of Ireland
- Coordinates: 53°35′57″N 7°23′35″W
- Country: Ireland
- Province: Leinster
- County: County Westmeath

Area
  - Total: 1.51 km^{2} (0.58 sq mi)
- Irish grid reference: N402612

Ballynafid (Irish: Baile na Feide) is a townland in County Westmeath, Ireland. It is located about 10 kilometres (6 mi) north–west of Mullingar. This place name is not to be confused with Ballinafid and Ballinafid Lake, which are in the neighboring townland of Knightswood.

Ballynafid is one of 15 townlands of the civil parish of Leny in the barony of Corkaree in the Province of Leinster. The townland covers 374 acres (1.51 km^{2}), of which 108 acres (0.44 km^{2}) are within the adjacent civil parish of Portnashangan. The neighboring townlands are: Culleendarragh to the north, Culleenabohoge and Knightswood to the east, Clanhugh Demesne and Portnashangan to the south, and Heathland and Kilpatrick to the west.

In the 1911 census of Ireland, there were 4 houses and 41 inhabitants in the townland.
