= Multyfarnham or Fearbranagh =

Townland in County Westmeath, Ireland

- Townland
- Location of Multyfarnham or Fearbranagh within County Westmeath in the Republic of Ireland
- Coordinates: 53°37′14″N 7°22′28″W
- Country: Ireland
- Province: Leinster
- County: County Westmeath
- Irish grid reference: N414635

Multyfarnham or Fearbranagh is a townland in County Westmeath, Ireland. It is about 11 kilometres (7 mi) north of Mullingar.

Multyfarnham or Fearbranagh spans two civil parishes; it is one of 11 townlands of the civil parish of Stonehall and one of 12 townlands of the civil parish of Tyfarnham, both in the barony of Corkaree in the Province of Leinster. The townland covers 110 hectares (260 acres).

The neighbouring townlands are: Lismalady and Multyfarnham to the north, Killintown to the east, Culleenabohoge and Tyfarnham to the south and Ballindurrow and Rathganny to the west.

In the 1911 census of Ireland there were 5 houses and 9 inhabitants in the townland.
