= Portnashangan (civil parish) =

Civil parish in County Westmeath, Ireland

Portnashangan Port na Seangán
- Civil parish
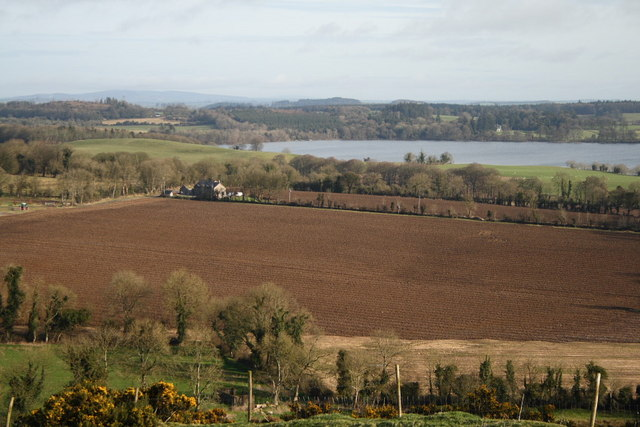
- Fields in Mountmurray townland on the northern shores of Lough Owel

- Location of Portnashangan within County Westmeath, Ireland
- Coordinates: 53°35′3″N 7°22′49″W
- Country: Ireland
- Province: Leinster
- County: County Westmeath
- Irish grid reference: N411595

Portnashangan (Irish: Port na Seangán) is a civil parish in County Westmeath, Ireland. It is located about 7 km (4 mi) north-north–west of Mullingar on both sides of Lough Owel.

Portnashangan is one of 8 civil parishes in the barony of Corkaree in the province of Leinster. The civil parish covers 3,621.8 acres (14.657 km^{2}).

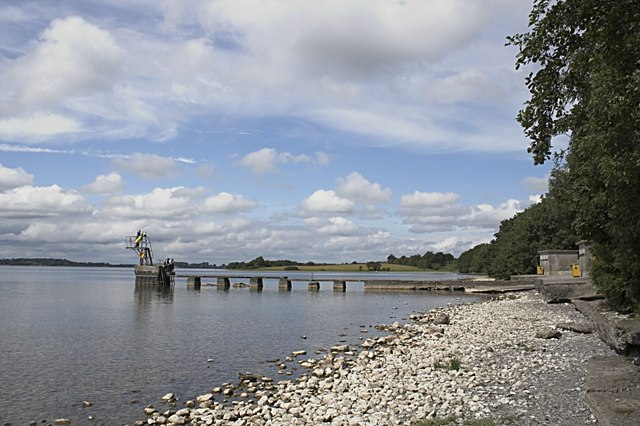
Jetty in Portnashangan townland at the eastern shore of Lough Owel

Portnashangan civil parish comprises 8 townlands: Ballynafid, Ballynagall Clanhugh Demesne, Loughanstown, Mountmurray, Piercefield, Portnashangan and Rathlevanagh. Of these, Mountmurray and Piercefield lie west of Lough Owel, the others to the east of the lake. The two parts of the parish have no land connection and are separated by the area of Leny parish.

The neighbouring civil parishes are: Stonehall and Tyfarnham to the north, Rathconnell (barony of Moyashel and Magheradernon) to the east, Mullingar (Moyashel and Magheradernon) and Portloman to the south and Leny to the east.
