= Rathaniska =

Townland in County Westmeath, Ireland

- Townland
- Location of Rathaniska within County Westmeath in the Republic of Ireland
- Coordinates: 53°36′27″N 7°26′39″W
- Country: Ireland
- Province: Leinster
- County: County Westmeath
- Irish grid reference: N368621

Rathaniska, also known as Baile Marlainn or Marlinstown, is a townland in County Westmeath, Ireland. It is located about 11 kilometres (7 mi) north–west of Mullingar.

Rathaniska is one of 15 townlands of the civil parish of Leny in the barony of Corkaree in the Province of Leinster. The townland covers 122 acres (0.49 km^{2}), of which 6 acres (0.024 km^{2}) are within the civil parish of Lackan. The neighbouring townlands are: Leny to the north, Rathbennett to the east, Farrow to the south and Ballyvade to the west.

In the 1911 census of Ireland there were 3 houses and 8 inhabitants in the townland.
