= Street, County Westmeath (civil parish) =

Civil parish in County Westmeath, Ireland

Street An tSráid
- Civil parish
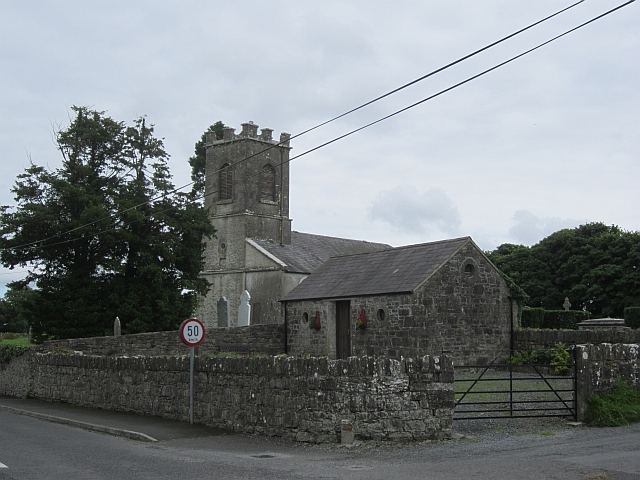
- St. Mary's Church, Street

- Location of Street within County Westmeath, Ireland
- Coordinates: 53°41′12″N 7°27′15″W
- Country: Ireland
- Province: Leinster
- County: County Westmeath
- Irish grid reference: N 361708

Street (Irish: An tSráid) is a civil parish in County Westmeath, Ireland. It is located about 20 km (12 mi) north-north-west of Mullingar.

Street is one of 6 civil parishes in the barony of Moygoish in the Province of Leinster. The civil parish covers 13,365 acres (54.09 km^{2}).

Street civil parish comprises 35 townlands: Athenboy, Ballew, Ballykildevin, Barradrum, Boherquill, Bottomy, Burgesland, Chancery, Clonava, Clonconnell, Clonkeen, Clonmore, Coolamber, Coolnagun, Cornacausk, Corralanna, Correaly, Culvin, Derradd, Dunamon, Fearmore, Garriskil, Gortanear, Hospitalbank, Kilmore, Kilshallow, Kiltareher, Lisduff, Lismacaffry, Lisnagappagh, Milkernagh, Monagead, Rath, Rehabane and Tinode.

The neighbouring civil parishes are Lickbla (barony of Fore to the north-east, Mayne (barony of Fore) to the east, Lackan (barony of Corkaree) and Russagh to the south and Granard (County Longford), Mostrim (County Longford), and Street (County Longford} to the west.

== See also ==
- Street, County Westmeath
