= Ballinalack =

Village and townland in County Westmeath, Ireland

Ballinalack Béal Átha na Leac
- Townland and village
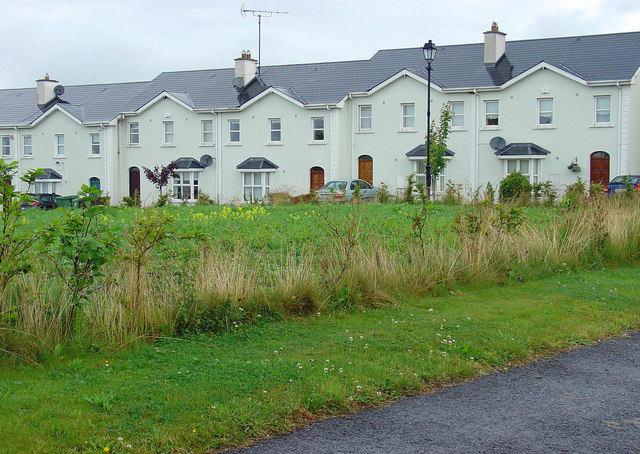
- Houses at Ballinalack

- Location of Ballinalack within County Westmeath in the Republic of Ireland
- Coordinates: 53°37′41″N 7°28′6″W
- Country: Ireland
- Province: Leinster
- County: County Westmeath

Area
  - Total: 0.62 km^{2} (0.24 sq mi)

Population (2022)
  - Total: 161
- Irish grid reference: N352644

Ballinalack (Irish: Béal Átha na Leac, meaning 'the mouth of the ford of the flag-stones') is a village and a townland in County Westmeath, Ireland. It is located about 14 kilometres (9 mi) north–west of Mullingar.

Ballinalack is one of 15 townlands of the civil parish of Leny in the barony of Corkaree in the Province of Leinster. The townland covers 151 acres (0.61 km^{2}). The River Inny meanders past forming the western boundary of the townland. The neighbouring townlands are: Cappagh to the north, Carrick and Grange to the east, Cullenhugh and Glebe to the south and Joanstown to the west.

In the 1911 census of Ireland there were 24 houses and 105 inhabitants in the townland, mostly centred in the village. It has a pub called The Western Gem, located in the village centre.
