= Kilbixy (civil parish) =

Civil parish in County Westmeath, Ireland

Kilbixy Cill Bhiscí
- Civil parish
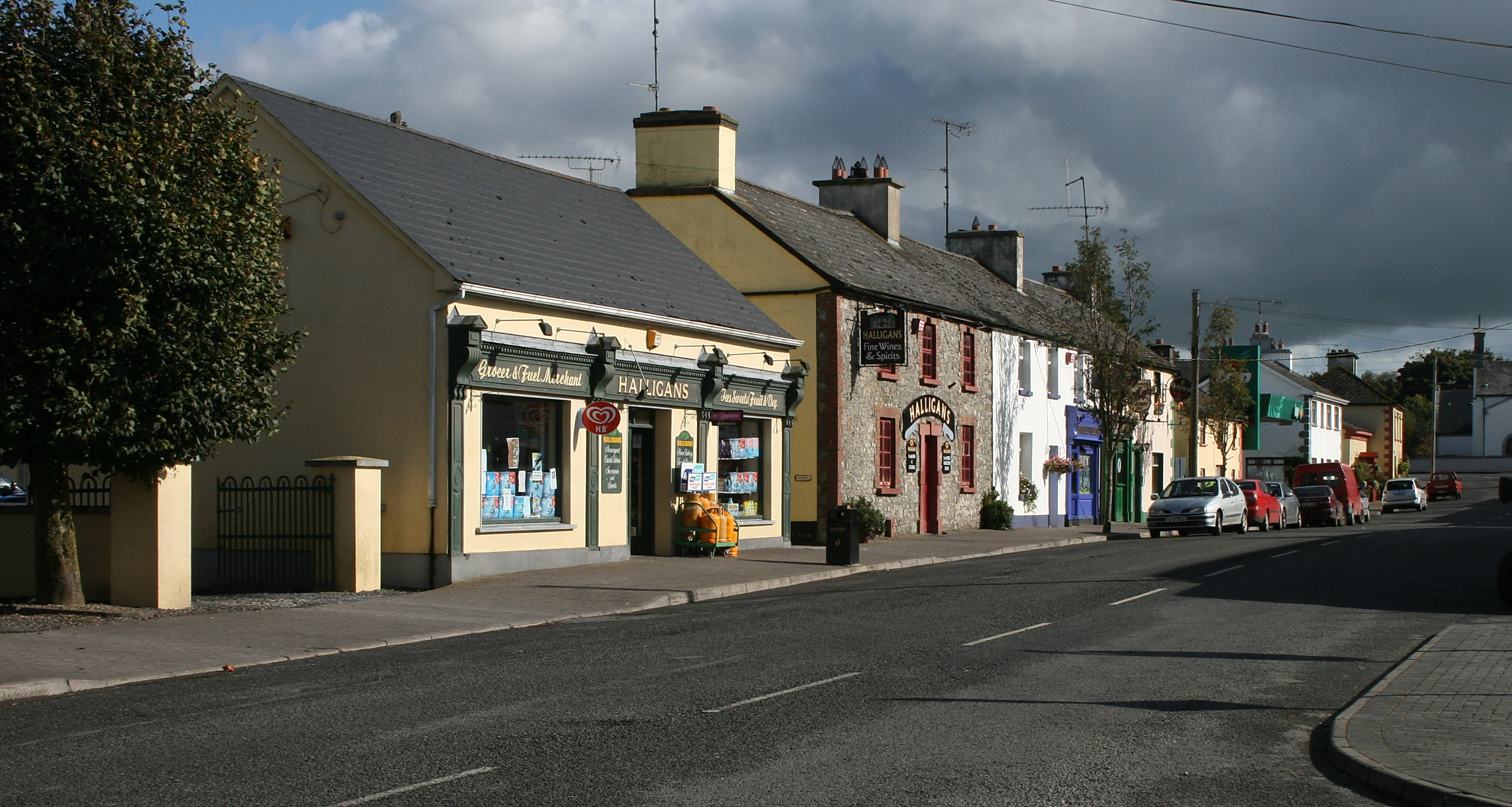
- Ballynacargy village

- Location of Templeoran in County Westmeath, Ireland
- Coordinates: 53°33′25″N 7°27′35″W
- Country: Ireland
- Province: Leinster
- County: County Westmeath
- Irish grid reference: N326606

Kilbixy (Irish: Cill Bhiscí) is a civil parish in County Westmeath, Ireland. It is located about 13 km (8 mi) north‑west of Mullingar. The village of Ballynacarrigy is the largest settlement in the parish.

Kilbixy is one of 6 civil parishes in the barony of Moygoish in the province of Leinster. The civil parish covers 6,516.5 acres (26.371 km^{2}).

Kilbixy civil parish comprises 22 townlands: Ballallen, Ballycorkey, Ballyhoreen, Ballyhug, Ballynacarrig Old, Ballynacarrigy, Ballynacroghy a.k.a. Gallowstown, Ballysallagh (Fox), Ballysallagh (Tuite), Balroe, Baronstown, Baronstown Demesne, Charlestown and Abbeyland a.k.a. Ballynamonaster, Cumminstow, Grange, Kilbixy, Kill, Moranstown, Rath, Toor Commons, Tristernagh and Tristernagh Demesne.

The neighbouring civil parishes are: Rathaspick to the north‑west and north, Leny (barony of Corkaree) to the north‑east, Templeoran to the south‑east and Kilmacnevan to the south‑west and west.
