= Loughanstown, Portnashangan =

Townland in County Westmeath, Ireland

Loughanstown
- Townland
- Location of Loughanstown within County Westmeath in the Republic of Ireland
- Coordinates: 53°35′10″N 7°21′13″W
- Country: Ireland
- Province: Leinster
- County: County Westmeath
- Irish grid reference: N428597

Loughanstown is a townland in County Westmeath, Ireland. It is located about 6.83 kilometres (4 mi) north of Mullingar.

Loughanstown is one of 8 townlands of the civil parish of Portnashangan in the barony of Corkaree in the Province of Leinster. The townland covers 357 acres (1.44 km^{2}). The southern boundary of the townland includes the majority of Scragh Bog.

The neighbouring townlands are: Down and Rathlevanagh to the north, Garrysallagh to the east, Ballynagall to the south and Portnashangan to the west.

In the 1911 census of Ireland there were 12 houses and 50 inhabitants in the townland.
