= George Minchin =

Irish physicist and mathematician

George Minchin Minchin
- Born: 25 May 1845
- Died: 16 March 1914 (aged 68)
- Occupations: mathematician, physicist
- Employer(s): Royal Indian Engineering College, New College, Oxford

George Minchin Minchin (born George Minchin Smith, 1845–1914) was an Irish mathematician and experimental physicist. He was a pioneer in the development of astronomical photometry: the first-ever celestial photometric measurements were made using photovoltaic cells that he developed for the purpose. He invented the absolute sine-electrometer and was a prolific author of mathematical and scientific textbooks and papers.

== Early life and family ==
He was born George Minchin Smith on 25 May 1845 on Valentia Island, County Kerry, Ireland to George Smith and Alice Minchin. His mother died when he was nine years old. His father, an attorney who lived in Donnybrook, Dublin, placed him into the care of his uncle (by marriage) on his mother's side, David Bell. A literary scholar, Bell ran a school in Dublin and was uncle to another pupil at the school, one Alexander Graham Bell. Minchin's notable mathematical ability was encouraged.

He entered Trinity College, Dublin in 1862, matriculating under the name George Minchin Smith, and won the first university scholarship in mathematics in 1865, and the Lloyd exhibition in mathematics. In 1866, he graduated, still as G. M. Smith, with a Gold Medal in mathematics. By then he had assumed the name George Minchin Minchin, receiving his MA in 1870, under the new name, and then Madden's Premium in both 1871 and 1872 for his performance in the Fellowship examinations.

The Smiths were a Protestant family. George Minchin Smith changed his name to George Minchin Minchin evidently because his father had converted to Roman Catholicism and married a Catholic, Marie O’Neill, possibly his housekeeper, with whom he already had three children.

In 1887 Minchin married Emma Fawcett of Lecarrow (or Strandhill), County Leitrim. They had two children, George Robert Neville in 1888 and Una Eleanor in 1890. [George junior became an engineer and later the managing director of Peto & Radford (accumulator manufacturers) and the Chloride battery company.]

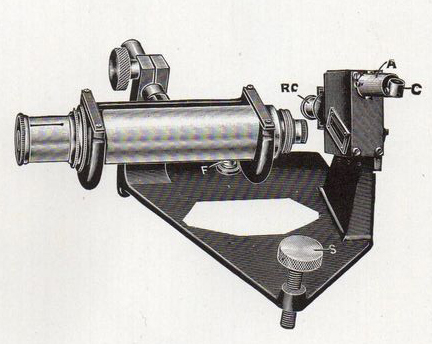
This electrometer type was invented by George Minchin and developed by others, in this case the tilted gold-leaf electrometer of Charles Thomson Rees Wilson and George William Clarkson Kaye, marketed by Cambridge Scientific Instruments.

== Career ==
In 1875 Minchin became the Professor of Applied Mathematics at the Royal Indian Engineering College (aka Coopers Hill or R.I.E. College) on the outskirts of London, and the same year he was elected to the London Mathematical Society. As a lecturer at RIEC, he was described as "brilliant", much admired for his wit and ability to draw in pupils and colleagues alike with otherwise dull topics. He maintained a regular correspondence, particularly with George Francis FitzGerald. Minchin wrote many mathematical and scientific texts and his clarity of exposition was lauded; he wrote and lectured about the importance of using clear English when producing texts for students. He also encouraged using "a touch of humour," citing the work of George Salmon and James Clerk Maxwell as exemplars. He wrote humorous works including comical mathematical poems. He has been credited with introducing the term 'potential function' with reference to applications in physics and engineering, but George Green had in fact done so as early as 1828. He was noted for being one of the College's best tennis players (he had also been a cricketer). He loved birds and birdwatching and kept a few in cages in his rooms.

Minchin performed early experiments with radio waves, x-rays and photoelectricity, both at RIEC and University College London (in the latter at the new laboratory of George Carey Foster, from 1875). Experiments included coating platinum with light-sensitive dyes, a technique he developed until he was able to detect "Hertzian waves" (radio waves) in his "impulsion cell", and he suspected that the Branly's tube with iron filings which detected the waves operated similarly. The sensitivity of Minchin's photo-electric cell apparatus was tested through a number of thick walls and outside as far as the woods at the edge of the RIEC lawn. A light switch was successfully operated remotely. Oliver Lodge read Minchin's paper, The Action of Electromagnetic Radiation on Films containing Metallic Powders, and developed an improved 'Branly' tube that he named a coherer. In his publication Signalling Across Space Without Wires, Lodge tabled Branly's filings, Minchins impulsion cell and his own (and David Edward Hughes's) coherer as "microphonic" radiation detectors (the others being mechanical, electrical, thermal, chemical and physiological). One year later Guglielmo Marconi demonstrated wireless telegraphy with the usage of a coherer.

In 1877, Minchin began work on using photoelectricity with a view to transmitting images. Four years earlier, Willoughby Smith had discovered the photoelectric effect on selenium rods; Minchin became skilled at creating photovoltaic cells made from selenium. His idea was to have a bundle of many insulated wires in parallel, their ends light-sensitised with selenium to detect an image, and for the far ends to emit a proportional level of light registered by a photographic film, effectively as pixels. The efforts were unsuccessful.

Continuing his work, Minchin developed a selenium photocathode on an aluminium base which was immersed in acetone. He complained that some scientists rejected the worthiness of experimentation with photoelectricity out of ignorance, a situation he described as "madness." He was the most insightful of 19th century experimenters in suggesting that photocells transformed energy without being changed themselves. He also made the key point that one should not assume surfaces need to be black to absorb usefully the most energy and that undiscovered surface properties might absorb visible light or other unknown wavelengths better, so scientists could not comment on the efficacy of light-sensitive cells without further scientific testing. These posited differences in energy were in fact later identified through the work of Max Planck and Albert Einstein.

Keen to test his new cells, in late 1891 Minchin contacted a friend — William Monck – who had built an observatory with a 7.5 inch (19 cm) refractor at his home in Earlsfort Terrace, Dublin. For the experiment, Monck ordered a new quadrant electrometer after FitzGerald was unable to provide a suitable one. The following August, Minchin provided Monck with improved cells but returned to England because of bad weather. More clement conditions on the morning of 28 August enabled Monck and his neighbour Stephen Dixon to measure the "striking" effect of the Moon and the relative brightness of Venus and Jupiter, the first photometric measurements in the history of astronomy. The measurements of stars were uncertain, however.

Minchin met William Wilson in London and the latter invited him to try his cells at the new observatory at his home, Daramona House, County Westmeath. In April 1895, Wilson and Minchin operated the 2-foot (60 cm) reflector, and FitzGerald the galvanometer below. Minchin published the results of a few days' observations in the Proceedings of the Royal Society, describing the relative magnitudes of the stars Regulus, Arcturus and Procyon, and acknowledging Monck's measurements. It is believed he visited Wilson's home in 1894 and 1897, and he certainly did in September 1895 and January 1896, but no other observations were recorded.

Minchin invented a metrological device, the absolute sine-electrometer, a very sensitive development of the gold-leaf electroscope; this device was further developed and marketed as a 'tilted gold-leaf electrometer' by the Cambridge Scientific Instrument Company, amongst others.

He was elected a Fellow of the Royal Society in 1895.

He resisted his colleagues' and students' entreaties to scale up his experiments to create something of practical usage, preferring his work to be considered as purely for learning. RIEC closed in 1906 and he moved to New College, Oxford because of its laboratories and telescopes.

He died on 23 March 1914, survived by his wife and children.

== Publications ==
Some publications ran to several editions, continuing until at least 1924.

- A Treatise on statics, containing some of the fundamental propositions in electrostatics. (London, Longmans, 1877/Oxford, Clarendon Press, 1880-) [This treatise was one of a series on statics published over the following years with different sub-topics, volumes, editions and translations]
- A General Theorem in Kinematics. (Nature, volume 23, no. 582, 1880)
- Photo-Electricity. (Scientific American, volume 10 no. 283, 1880)
- A Kinematical Theorem. (Nature, volume 24 no. 624, 1881)
- The Determination of Electromotive Force in Absolute Electrostatic Measure. (Nature, volume 25, no. 638, 1882)
- The Absolute Sine Electrometer. (Nature, volume 25, no. 369)
- Electrostatic Measurement of E.M.F.(Nature, volume 29, no. 752)
- Scientific Nomenclature. (Nature, volume 34, no. 865)
- Minchin's Statics. (Science, volume 8, no. 180)
- Ampère's Rule. (Nature, volume 34, no. 870)
- A Manual of Mechanics. (Nature, volume 34, no. 877)
- Naturae veritas. (London/New York, Macmillan, 1887)
- Centre of Water Pressure. (Nature, volume 37, no. 948/no. 951)
- General Equations of Fluid Motion. (Nature, volume 39, no. 1010)
- Photo-electric Impulsion Cells. (Nature, volume 42, no. 1073)
- Experiments in Photoelectricity. (Proceedings of the Physical Society of London, volume 11, no. 1) [also in other journals/languages]
- “Nowhere can Mathematics be learned as at Cambridge” (Nature, volume 43, no. 1103)
- Experiments in Photoelectricity. (London, Taylor & Francis, 1891)
- Hydrostatics and Elementary Hydrokinetics. (Oxford, Clarendon Press, 1892)
- Electromotive Force from the Light of the Stars. (Nature, volume 49, no. 1264)
- A Fire Ball. (Scientific American, volume 73, no.24)
- The Electrical Measurement of Starlight. (Nature, volume 52, no. 1341)
- The electrical measurement of starlight. Observations made at the Observatory of Daramona House, Co. Westmeath, in April, 1895. Preliminary report. (London, Taylor & Francis, 1895)
- The electrical measurement of starlight. Observations made at the Observatory of Daramona House, Co. Westmeath, in January, 1896. Second report. (London, Harrison & Francis, 1896)
- Personal Injury from a Fire-ball. (Nature, volume 53, no. 1358)
- Geometry for Beginners. (Oxford, Clarendon Press, 1898)
- Geometry Versus Euclid. (Nature, volume 59, no. 1529)
- The Teaching of Geometry. (London, Macmillan, 1899)
- Bell's Science Series. Edited by P.M. Groom and G.M. Minchin. (London, George Bell & Sons, 1900–1909)
- The student's dynamics : comprising statics and kinetics. (London, George Bell & Sons, 1900–1909)
- England's Neglect of Science. (Nature, volume 64, no. 1653)
- Plane and Solid Geometry. (Nature, volume 64, no. 1667)
- A New Treatise on the Calculus. (Nature, volume 65, no. 1693)
- Vectors and Rotors, with Applications. (Nature, volume 68, no. 1774)
- The Glorification of Energy. (Nature, volume 68, no. 1750)
- Mathematical Drawing. (Nature, volume 71, no. 1835)
- Elements of the Differential and Integral Calculus. (Nature, volume 72, no. 1854)
- The Photoelectric Property of Selenium. (Nature, volume 77, nos. 1991, 1993)
- Seleno-Aluminium Bridges. (Proceedings of the Royal Society of London. Series A, Containing Papers of a Mathematical and Physical Character, volume 81, no. 544)
- The Teaching of Geometry. (Nature, volume 80, no. 2065)
- A Treatise on Hydrodynamics. (Oxford, Clarendon Press, 1912)
- A Treatise on Hydrostatics. (Oxford, Clarendon Press, 1912)
