= Lackan (civil parish) =

Civil parish in County Westmeath, Ireland

Lackan Leacain
- Civil parish
- Location of Lackan within County Westmeath in Ireland
- Coordinates: 53°37′53″N 7°25′57″W
- Country: Ireland
- Province: Leinster
- County: County Westmeath
- Irish grid reference: N376648

Lackan (Irish: Leacain) is a civil parish in County Westmeath, Ireland. It is located about 13 km (8 mi) north–north–west of Mullingar. This name also applies to the townland of Lackan.

Lackan is one of 8 civil parishes in the barony of Corkaree in the province of Leinster. The civil parish covers 3,204.8 acres (12.969 km^{2}).

Lackan civil parish comprises 10 townlands: Ballyharney, Carrick, Fulmort, Grange, Heathland, Knockmorris, Lackan, Lackanwood, Leny and Rathaniska.

The neighbouring civil parishes are: Street (barony of Moygoish) to the north, Multyfarnham to the east, Leny to the south and Russagh (Moygoish) to the west.
