= Multyfarnham (civil parish) =

Civil parish in County Westmeath, Ireland

Multyfarnham Muilte Farannáin
- Civil parish
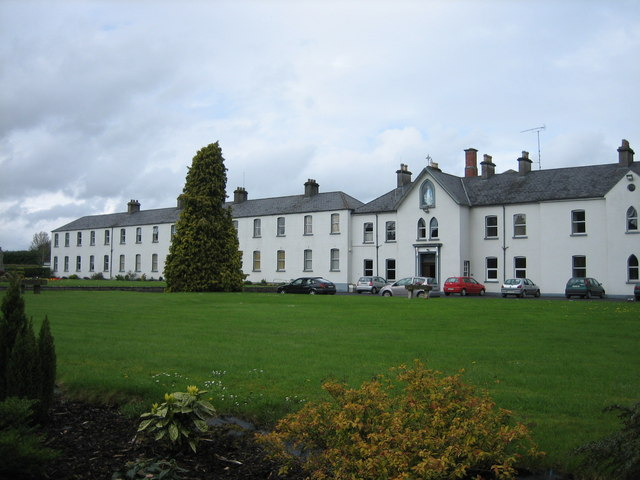
- Friary in Abbeyland townland, Multyfarnham

- Location of Multyfarnham within County Westmeath in Ireland
- Coordinates: 53°38′3″N 7°22′31″W
- Country: Ireland
- Province: Leinster
- County: County Westmeath
- Irish grid reference: N414651

Multyfarnham (Irish: Muilte Farannáin) is a civil parish in County Westmeath, Ireland. It is located about 12 km (7 mi) north of Mullingar on the southwestern shore of Lough Derravaragh.

Multyfarnham is one of 8 civil parishes in the barony of Corkaree in the province of Leinster. The civil parish covers 4,846.2 acres (19.612 km^{2}).

Multyfarnham civil parish comprises the village of Multyfarnham, and 14 townlands: Abbeyland, Ballindurrow, Ballinphort, Ballinriddera, Ballynaclonagh, Ballynakill, Donore, Froghanstown, Lismalady, Monintown, the townland of Multyfarnham, Rathganny, Soho and Tober.

The neighbouring civil parishes are: Mayne (barony of Fore) to the north, Faughalstown (Fore) to the north and east, Leny, Stonehall and Tyfarnham to the south and Lackan to the west.

== See also ==
Multyfarnham
