= Carrick, Lackan =

Townland in County Westmeath, Ireland

Carrick
- Townland
- Location of Carrick within County Westmeath in the Republic of Ireland
- Coordinates: 53°37′28″N 7°26′58″W
- Country: Ireland
- Province: Leinster
- County: County Westmeath
- Irish grid reference: N364639

Carrick is a townland in County Westmeath, Ireland. It is located about 13 kilometres (8 mi) north–west of Mullingar. The name Carrick also applies to 33 other townlands in Ireland.

Carrick is one of 10 townlands of the civil parish of Lackan in the barony of Corkaree in the Province of Leinster. The townland covers 303 acres (1.23 km^{2}). The neighbouring townlands are: Grange to the north, Lackan to the east, Leny to the south and Ballinalack and Cullenhugh to the west.

In the 1911 census of Ireland there were 3 houses and 18 inhabitants in the townland.
