= Knightswood, County Westmeath =

Knightswood
- Townland
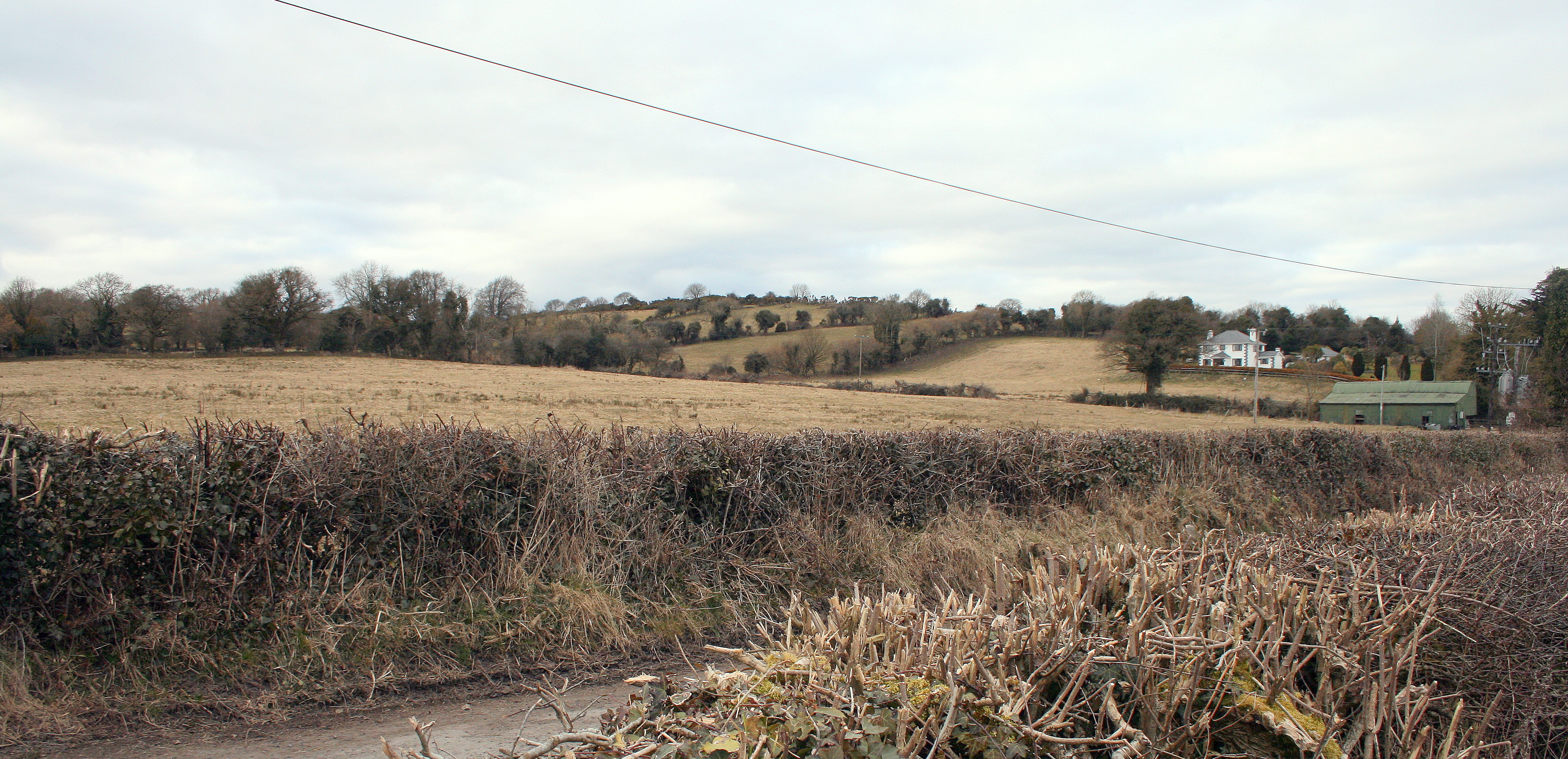
- Pasture in Knightswood

- Location of Knightswood within County Westmeath in the Republic of Ireland
- Coordinates: 53°35′55″N 7°22′20″W
- Country: Ireland
- Province: Leinster
- County: County Westmeath
- Irish grid reference: N416611

Knightswood is a townland in County Westmeath, Ireland. It is located about 8.6 kilometres (5 mi) north–north–west of Mullingar.

Knightswood is one of 15 townlands of the civil parish of Leny in the barony of Corkaree in the Province of Leinster. The townland covers 465 acres (1.88 km^{2}). The neighbouring townlands are: Culleenabohoge and Tyfarnham to the north, Down and Rathlevanagh to the east, Portnashangan to the south and Ballynafid and Culleendarragh to the west.

In the 1911 census of Ireland there were 19 houses and 57 inhabitants in the townland.
