= Donore, County Westmeath =

Donore
- Townland
- Location of Donore within County Westmeath in the Republic of Ireland
- Coordinates: 53°38′29″N 7°23′11″W
- Country: Ireland
- Province: Leinster
- County: County Westmeath
- Irish grid reference: N406658

Donore is a townland in County Westmeath, Ireland. It is located about 13.24 kilometres (8 mi) north of Mullingar.

Donore is one of 14 townlands of the civil parish of Multyfarnham in the barony of Corkaree in the Province of Leinster. The townland covers 732.36 acres (2.9638 km^{2}).

The neighbouring townlands are: Ballynakill to the east, Tober to the south–east, Froghanstown and Multyfarnham to the south and Ballynaclonagh and Soho to the west.

In the 1911 census of Ireland there were 5 houses and 25 inhabitants in the townland.

Donore House, home to the Nugent family, was the largest estate in the area. It was sold to the Land Commission and the main house was demolished in the 1970s.
