= Multyfarnham Friary =

- Multyfarnham Franciscan Friary
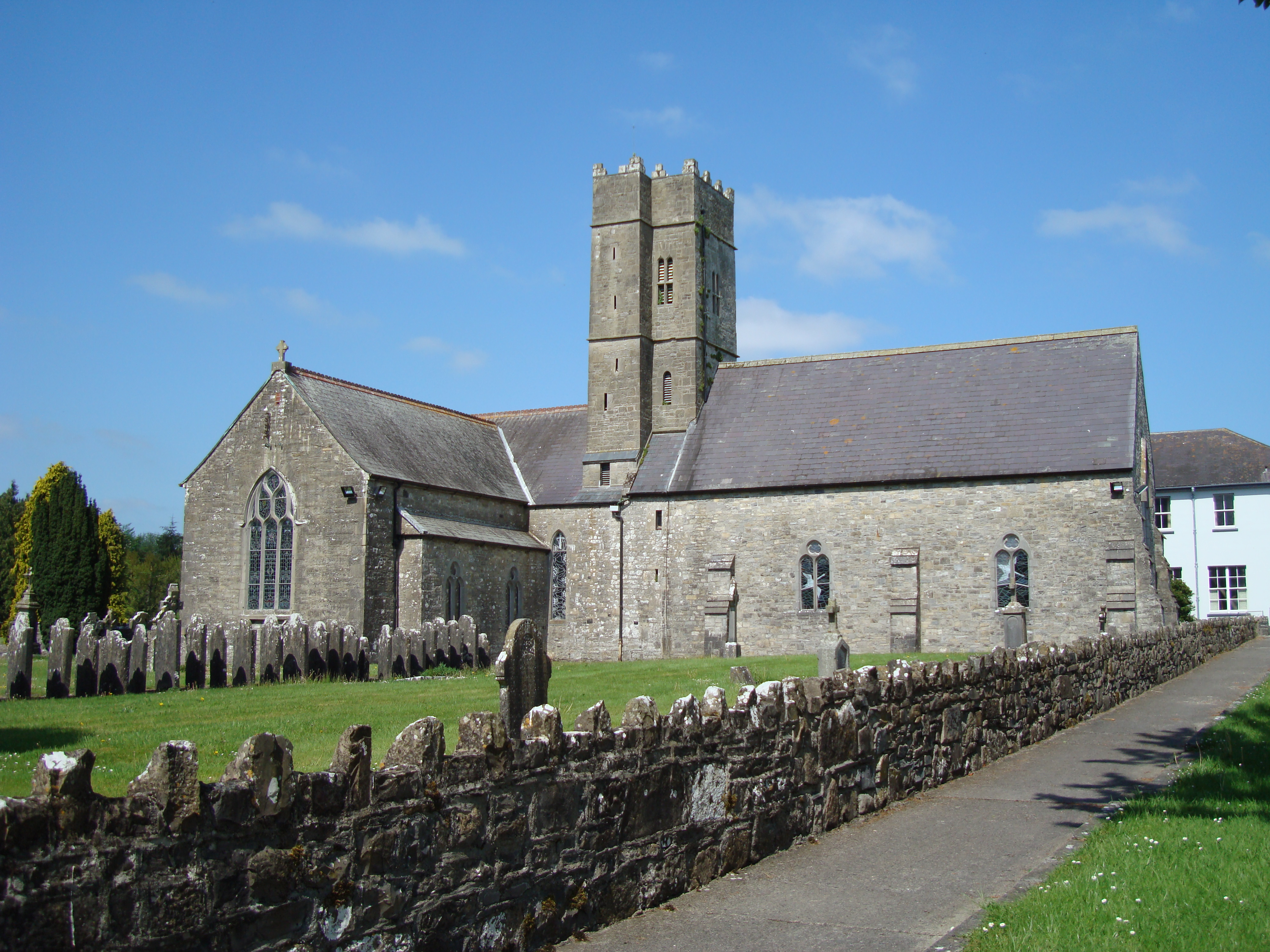
- Multyfarnham Friary

- Location within Ireland
- 53°37′42″N 7°23′32″W
- Location: Multyfarnham, County Westmeath, Ireland
- Denomination: Roman Catholic
- Religious institute: Franciscans
- Website: theabbeymultyfarnham.ie

History
- Status: Active
- Founded: 1268
- Founder: William Delamer

Administration
- Diocese: Roman Catholic Diocese of Meath

Multyfarnham Friary is a Franciscan friary located in Multyfarnham, County Westmeath, Ireland. It dates to the 15th century.

During the early 17th century, the friary served as a refuge for elderly and infirm friars and priests who were fleeing persecution in the wake of the English Reformation.

The friary had fallen into ruin by the 19th century, but the Franciscans reoccupied it in 1827. They re-used the nave, south transept and tower of the original friary in the construction of a new church.

The Multyfarnham Abbey is dedicated to Mary, Mother of God, whose feast is on 1 January, and to Saint Francis of Assisi, who is honoured on 4 October. Enter by the West Doorway, sprinkle yourself with holy water, for the ground you stand on is holy ground. The heavy, majestic doors are Irish oak, oak from the woods around Bagenalstown, County Carlow and the finished product is the workmanship of skilled tradesmen of Mohill County Leitrim. The first friars came to Multyfarnham around 1270 at the invitation of the Delamar family (soldier protectors) and is presumed that their patron would have provided them, shortly after that date, with a church and residence worthy of its piety and position. "Oh House of Friars, lonely dost thou stand, and few there are that cross thy threshold now, Who once had faithful friends at thy command. Why should destruction fall on such as thou?"

But the friars did return. They were hard, unsettled and dangerous times from 1613 to 1648. Friars were arrested, thrown in prison, left to die or deported to other continents. There was toleration between 1625 and 1641 when the clergy and Catholic nobility met there and had vigorous Franciscan activity. And the temple was reconstructed in 1827. "To the Almighty and Powerful God. In honour and under the patronage of the holy Virgin Mother Mary and St. Francis. This temple was reconstructed A.D. 1827." From Studio Printers, Athboy County Meath.

== See also ==
- List of abbeys and priories in Ireland (County Westmeath)
