= Street, County Westmeath =

Streete Sráid / an tSráid
- Village
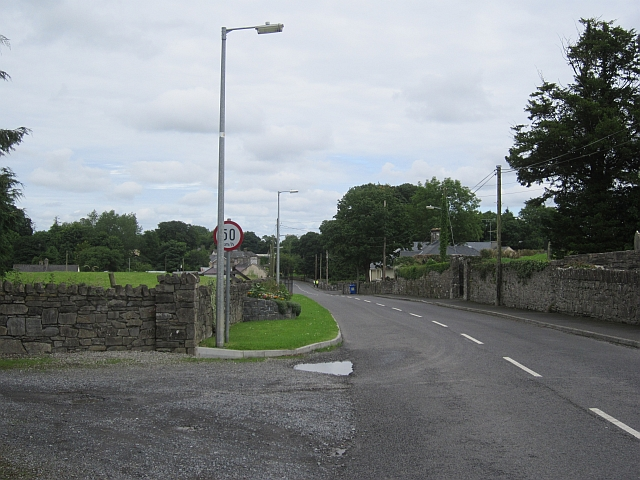
- Main street

- Location in Ireland
- Coordinates: 53°41′00″N 7°29′22″W
- Country: Ireland
- Province: Leinster
- County: County Westmeath
- Elevation: 66 m (217 ft)
- Time zone: UTC+0 (WET)
  - Summer (DST): UTC-1 (IST (WEST))
- Irish Grid Reference: N337704

Street or Streete (Irish: An tSráid or Sráid) is a village and parish in County Westmeath, Ireland. It lies on the regional road between Lismacaffery and Rathowen. Its Irish name was historically anglicised as Straid or Strade before it became Street or Streete.

== History and development ==
The remains of a Norman-era motte-and-bailey castle, known as either the "Castle of Magh-Breacruighe" or "Caisleán na Sráide", are located to the south of the village. Largely destroyed between the 13th and 15th century, only partial remains of the "steep-sided mound or motte" remain. Close to the castle site is a 19th century Church of Ireland church, built on the site of an earlier ecclesiastical enclosure.

Other 19th-century structures in the area include the village's community centre and "institute" (built c. 1856), a former saw mill (c. 1865), and a former observatory (built c. 1892). This observatory is associated with astronomer William Edward Wilson (1851–1908) and built within the ground's of his family's estate at Daramona House.

A large local amenity park and community centre was built to the north of the village in 2003.

== See also ==
- Street, County Westmeath (civil parish)
