= William Edward Wilson (astronomer) =

Irish astronomer (1851–1908)

William Edward Wilson (19 July 1851 – 6 March 1908) was an Irish astronomer.

== Life ==
He was born at Greenisland, County Antrim, the only son of John and Frances Wilson of the family estate at Daramona House, Streete, County Westmeath, Ireland and was privately educated.

He became interested in astronomy and travelled to Oran in 1870 to photograph the solar eclipse. In 1871 he acquired a reflecting telescope of 12 inches (30.5 cm) aperture and set it up in a dome in the gardens of Daramona House near the village of Streete. He used it to experiment on the photography of the Moon with wet plates and also began to study solar radiation using thermopiles. In 1881, he replaced the original telescope with a reflector of 24 inches (61 cm) aperture and a new dome and mounting that had an electrically controlled clock drive, from the Grubb Telescope Company. The new telescope was mounted in a two-storey tower attached to the house with an attached physical laboratory, darkroom and machine shop.

Wilson's main research efforts, in partnership with P.L. Gray, was to determine the temperature of the Sun using a "differential radio-micrometer" of the sort developed by C.V. Boys in 1889, which combined a bolometer and galvanometer into one instrument. The result of their measurements was an effective temperature of about 8000 °C for the Sun which, after correction to deal with absorption in the Earth's atmosphere, gave a value of 6590 °C, compared to the modern value of 6075 °C.

Other astronomical projects included observations on the transit of Venus, determination of stellar motion, observations of sunspots and a trip to Spain to photograph a solar eclipse. He took a great many excellent photographs of celestial bodies such as nebulae. His astronomical findings were published in a series of memoirs such as Experimental Observations on the Effective Temperature of the Sun.

He was elected a fellow of the Royal Astronomical Society in 1875 and a Fellow of the Royal Society in 1896. He received an honorary doctorate (D.Sc.) from the University of Dublin in June 1901.

Wilson served as High Sheriff of Westmeath for 1894.

He died relatively young (in 1908, aged 56) at Daramona, and was buried in the family plot in Streete churchyard. He had married in 1886 Caroline Ada, the daughter of Capt. R.C. Granville and had a son and two daughters. His son donated his telescope to London University, where it was used for research and teaching, finally becoming a feature in Liverpool museum.
