= Ardagh (barony) =

Coordinates: 53°41′05″N 7°39′23″W

Ardagh Ardach (Irish)
- Barony
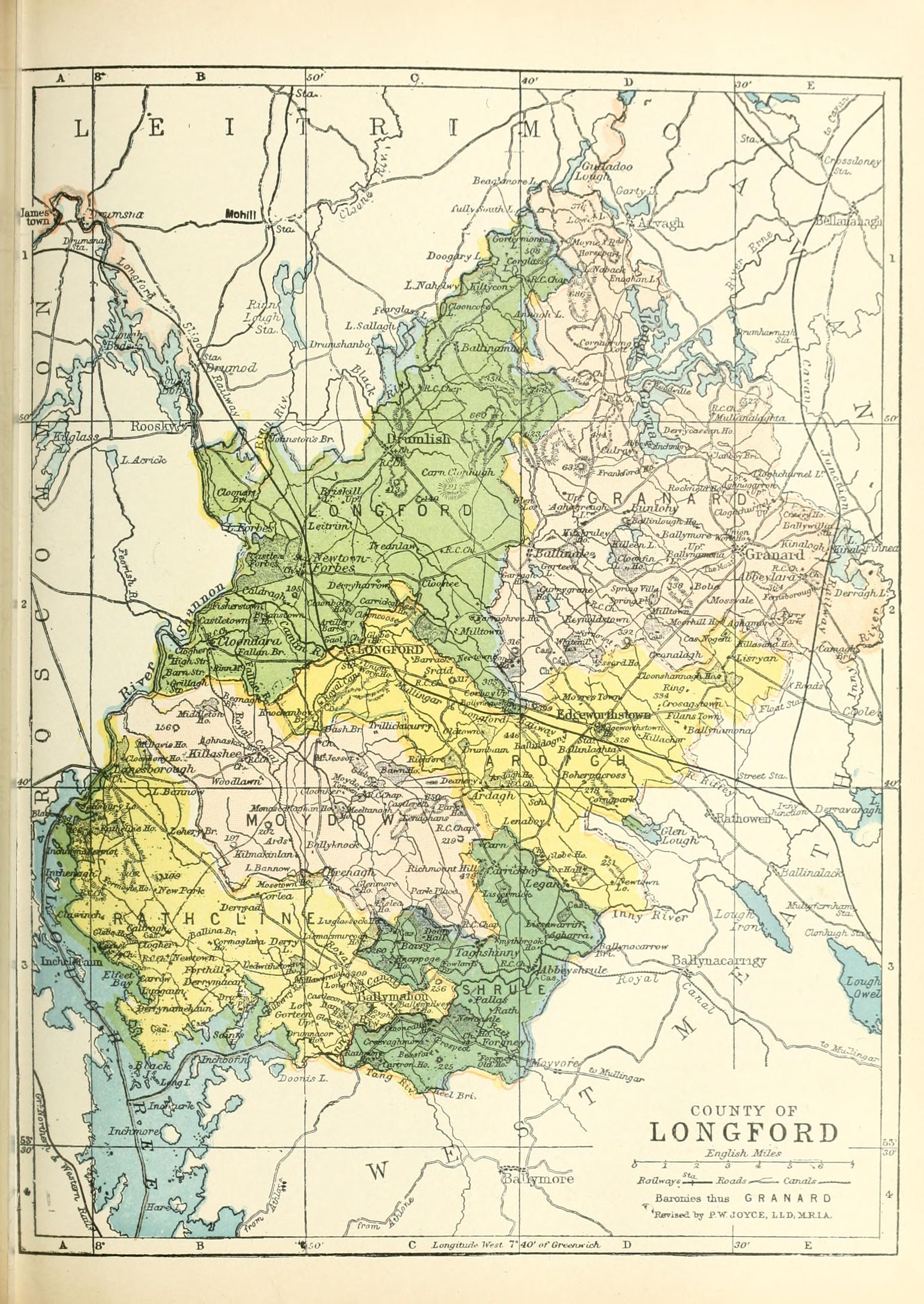
- Baronies of County Longford. Ardagh is shaded yellow.
- Sovereign state: Ireland
- County: Longford

Area
  - Total: 162.78 km^{2} (62.85 sq mi)

Ardagh (Irish: Ardach) is a barony in County Longford, Ireland.

== Etymology ==
Ardagh barony derives its name from the village of Ardagh, County Longford (from Árd-achadh, "high pasture").

== Location ==
Ardagh barony is located in eastern County Longford.

== History ==
In Early Christian times Ardagh was the centre of Tethbae Deiscirt (South Tethbae). Ardagh barony was formed from the territory of Sleughtwilliam (Edgeworthstown), the territory of Clangillernan (Templemichael), and from part of the church lands in the parishes of Ardagh and Ballymacormick.

== List of settlements ==
Below is a list of settlements in Ardagh barony:

- Ardagh
- Edgeworthstown (Mostrim)
- Lisryan
- Longford
