= Alex Culvin =

English footballer and academic (born 1983)

Personal information
- Full name: Alexandra Culvin
- Date of birth: 16 November 1983 (age 43)
- Place of birth: Liverpool, England
- Position: Full-back

Senior career*
Years	Team	Apps	(Gls)
1998–2002	Everton		
2002–2003	Doncaster Belles		
2003–2008	Leeds		
2008–2010	Everton		
2010–2011	AZ Alkmaar	11	(0)
2011–2012	Bristol Academy	14	(0)
2012	Liverpool	4	(0)
Academic background
Education	Liverpool John Moores University; University of Central Lancashire
Academic work
Discipline	Sport
Sub-discipline	Sport management
Institutions	University of Salford; Leeds Beckett University
- * Club domestic league appearances and goals

Alexandra Culvin (born 16 November 1983) is an English sports management lecturer and former women's footballer. As a footballer, Culvin played for Leeds, Everton, Doncaster Belles, AZ Alkmaar, Bristol Academy, and Liverpool, and as an academic, she has worked as a lecturer at the University of Salford and Leeds Beckett University.

== Football career ==
Culvin played predominantly as a full-back. In 2004, whilst Culvin was playing for Leeds, she was selected for the England women's under-21 squad. Culvin played for Leeds in the 2006 FA Women's Cup final against Arsenal. In 2009, whilst Culvin was playing for Everton, she was selected for the Great Britain women's football squad for the 2009 Universiade. Culvin later played for AZ Alkmaar in the women's Eredivisie, before signing for Bristol Academy in February 2011. She was sent off during Bristol Academy's 2012 FA Cup semi-final against Birmingham City. Culvin later played for Liverpool, before retiring in 2012. During her career, Culvin played in the UEFA Women's Champions League for Everton, AZ and Bristol Academy.

== Academic career ==
Culvin was born in Merseyside. In 2009, she was studying at Liverpool John Moores University, and she also wrote a PhD thesis on professional women's football in the UK at the University of Central Lancashire. She has worked as a sports management lecturer at the University of Salford, and as a senior lecturer at Leeds Beckett University.

Culvin is a supporter of universal basic income, and believes that men's football clubs should also have a women's team, as it would help them with public relations. In 2020, she investigated the health effects on players of the FA Women's Super League becoming a fully professional league. She found evidence of fat shaming and eating disorders amongst players. During the COVID-19 pandemic, she was critical of the government's decision to suspend women's football, whilst men's football was allowed to continue.

== Honours ==
=== Everton ===
- FA Women's Cup (1): 2009–10
