= Rathowen =

Village in County Westmeath, Ireland

Rathowen Ráth Eoghain
- Village
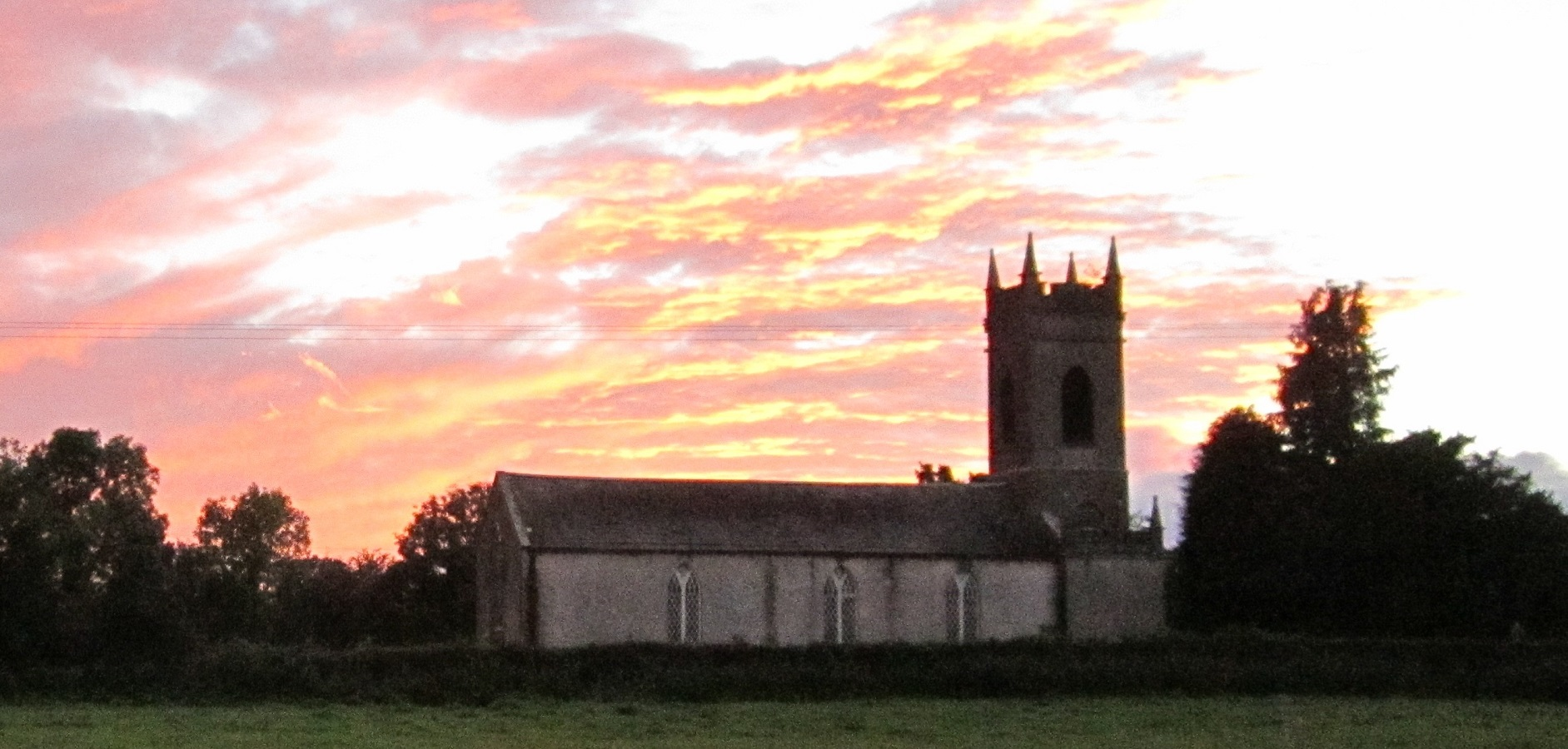
- St Thomas' Church

- Location in Ireland
- Coordinates: 53°39′36″N 7°31′12″W
- Country: Ireland
- Province: Leinster
- County: County Westmeath

Government
  - Dáil Éireann: Longford–Westmeath
  - EU Parliament: Midlands–North-West

Population (2022)
  - Total: 187
- Time zone: UTC+0 (WET)
  - Summer (DST): UTC-1 (IST (WEST))
- Irish Grid Reference: N317678

Rathowen (Irish: Ráth Eoghain, meaning 'Eoghan's ringfort') is a small village in County Westmeath, Ireland, on the N4 national primary route. Rathowen was designated as a census town by the Central Statistics Office for the first time in the 2016 census, at which time it had a population of 150 people. The population increased to 187 at the 2022 census.

The village is around 20 km northwest of Mullingar, 20 km southeast of Longford Town, and 100 km northwest of Dublin city centre.

== Transport ==
Street and Rathowen railway station was opened on 1 August 1877 and finally closed on 17 June 1963.

== See also ==
- List of towns and villages in Ireland
