= Multyfarnham =

Village in County Westmeath, Ireland

Multyfarnham Irish: Muilte Farannáin
- Village
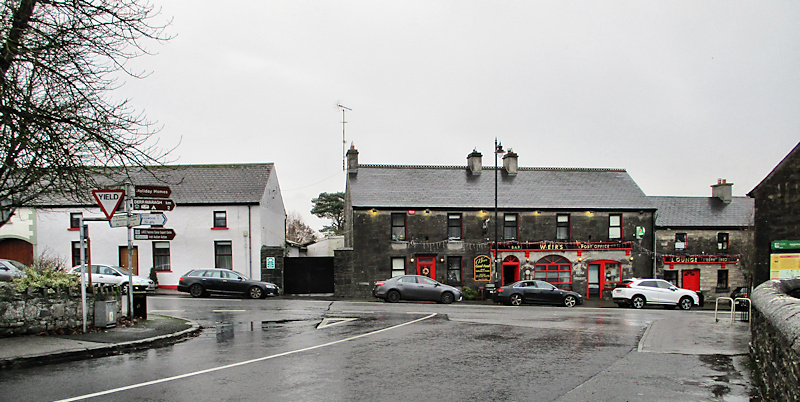
- Multyfarnham village

- Location in Ireland
- Coordinates: 53°37′30″N 7°23′23″W
- Country: Ireland
- Province: Leinster
- County: County Westmeath

Government
  - Dáil constituency: Longford–Westmeath
  - EU Parliament: Midlands–North-West

Population (2022)
  - Total: 460
- Irish grid reference: N404640

Multyfarnham or Multyfarnam (Irish: Muilte Farannáin, meaning 'Farannán's mills') is a village in County Westmeath, Ireland, 12 km north of Mullingar. As of the 2022 census, it had a population of 460 people.

== History ==
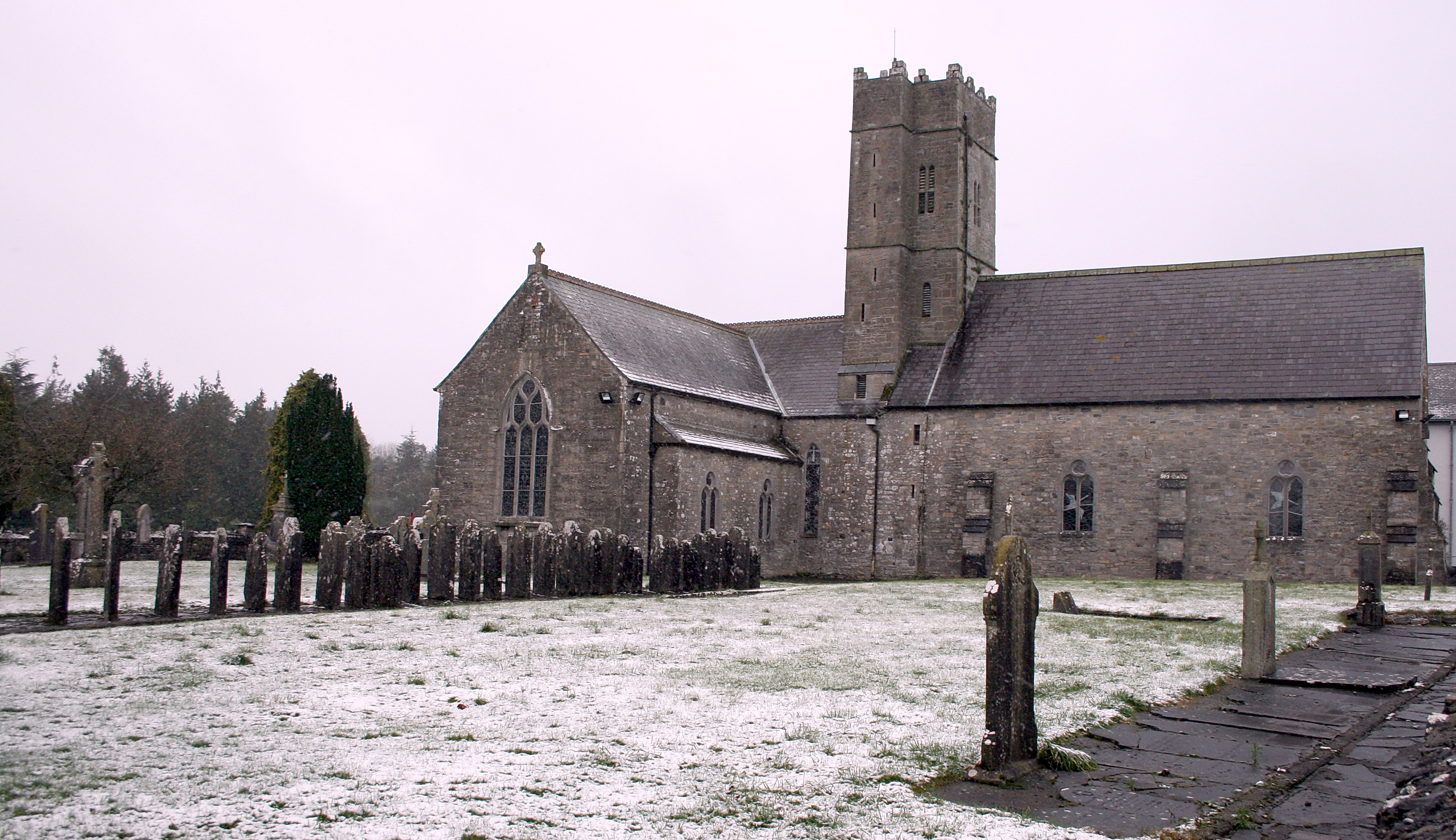
Multyfarnham friary and church

First founded in 1268, the Franciscan monastery at Multyfarnham is still home to a community of friars. During the English conquest of Ireland in the 17th century, the monastery was raided six times and twice burnt out by the Crown forces battling the forces of the 'Irish of Meath'. During the wars of the 1640s, it became an organisational centre for the powerful and influential Franciscan order, who met there in their provincial assembly at the outbreak of the 1641 rebellion. In 1646, there were 30 friars in residence. By the middle of the era of the Penal Laws, there were as few as seven friars, five of whom were of advanced age. The church was unroofed from 1651 and remained so until 1827. In 1839, a new friary was rebuilt in the grounds.

The Franciscan College, Multyfarnham, was opened in 1899. This school later became a recognised Agricultural College in 1956, and continued to teach until 2003. Around the monastery grounds, among the lawns, around the church and the college buildings, there are 14 life-size Stations of the Cross. The college is now used as an educational and seminar centre. It also hosts an arts centre. A nursing home called the Portiuncula Nursing Home also shares the site, as does Larcc Cancer Support Center and Irish Autism Action.

Wilson's Hospital School, also near Multyfarnham, was the scene of a battle during the 1798 Rebellion. There is a plaque commemorating the battle on one of the gate piers at the school's main entrance.

== Sport ==
The local Gaelic Athletic Association club is Multyfarnham GAA. The club fields Gaelic football teams in the Westmeath Intermediate Football Championship and All County League Division 3. In 2017, the club were crowned Westmeath Junior Champions, and went on to win the 2017 Leinster Junior Club Football Championship. The club later reached the All-Ireland Junior Club Football Championship final, losing out to Knocknagree of Cork. In 2018, the club started their first ladies team. There is also a Gaelic handball club in the village.

In March 1979, the Irish National Cross Country Championships were held in the grounds of the Franciscan Friary farm in Multyfarnham.

== Amenities and community ==
The town is close to the shores of Lough Derravaragh. Local recreational resources include hill walking, boating, and fishing, with authorised permits. Horse-riding facilities are also available nearby.

Multyfarnham was a winner of the Irish Tidy Towns Competition in 1977.

== Transport ==
The nearest bus stop is located at Ballinalack, approximately 7 kilometres distant, and is served by Bus Éireann Expressway routes 022 and 023 several times daily. Until 2013, route 115 served Multyfarnham once a day.

Multyfarnham railway station opened in November 1855 and closed on 17 June 1963. The nearest railway station is now Mullingar railway station, approximately 15 km distant.

== Gallery ==
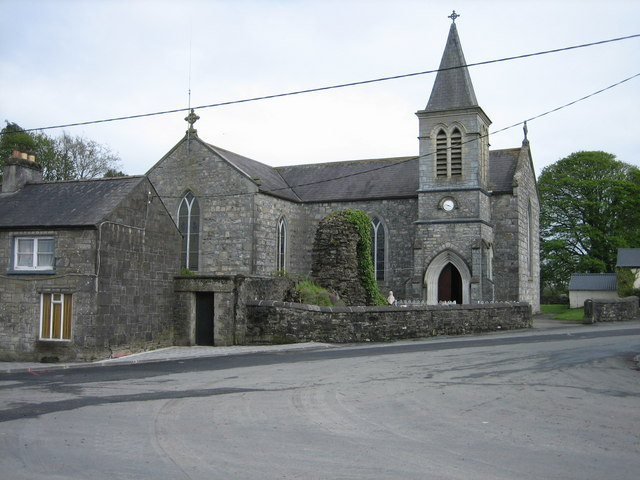
Multyfarnham parish church

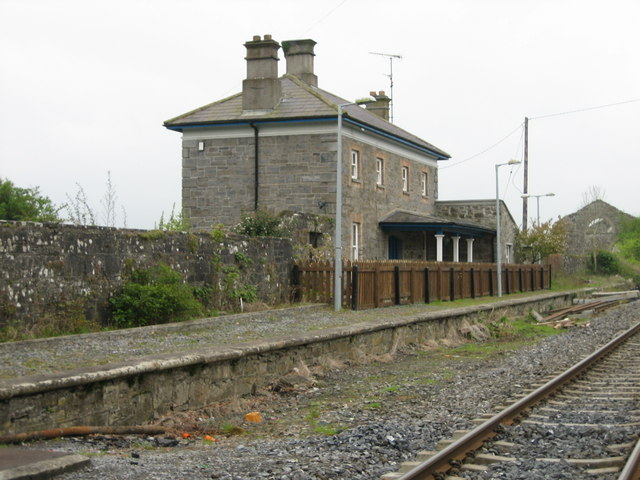
The closed Multyfarnham railway station, now a private dwelling

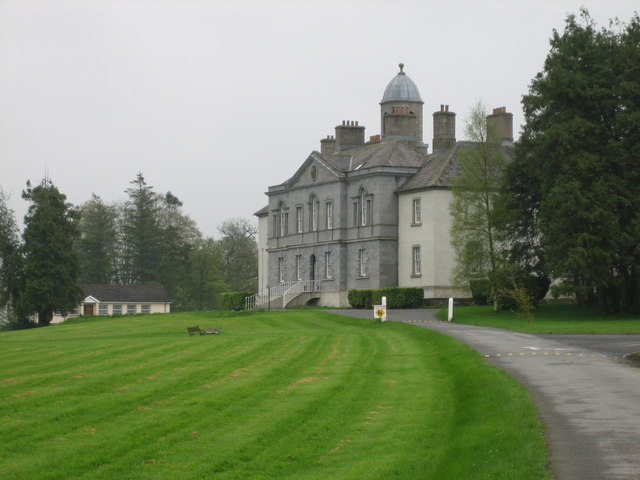
Wilson's Hospital, Multyfarnham, founded in 1761 as a school for young Protestant boys and a hospital for old men

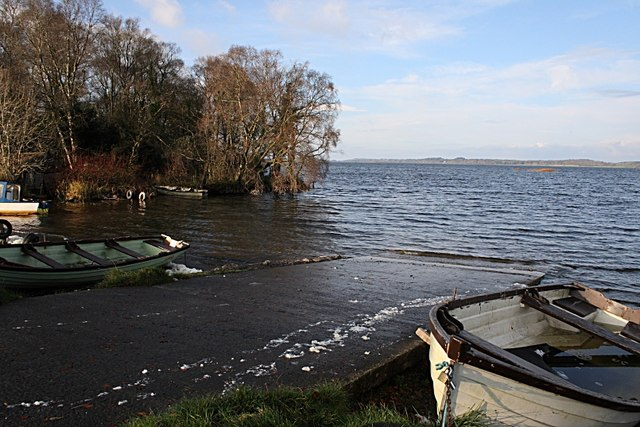
Boat slip on south shore of Lough Owel

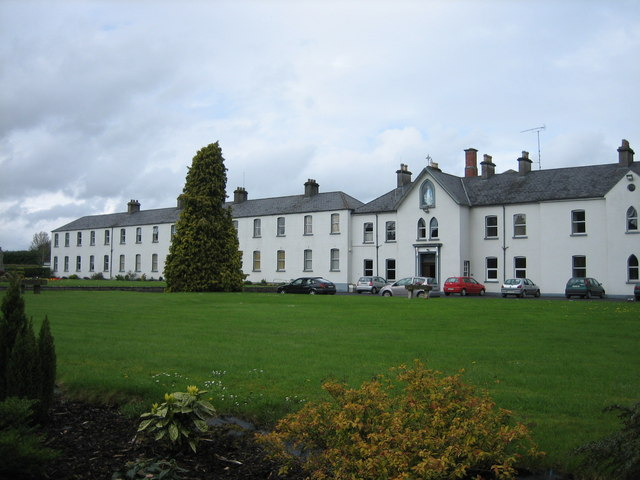
Franciscan Friary, Multyfarnham. This became an agricultural college in 1956 and closed in 2003.

== See also ==
- List of towns and villages in Ireland
