= Moygoish =

Barony in County Westmeath, Ireland

Moygoish Uí Mhac gCuais
- Barony
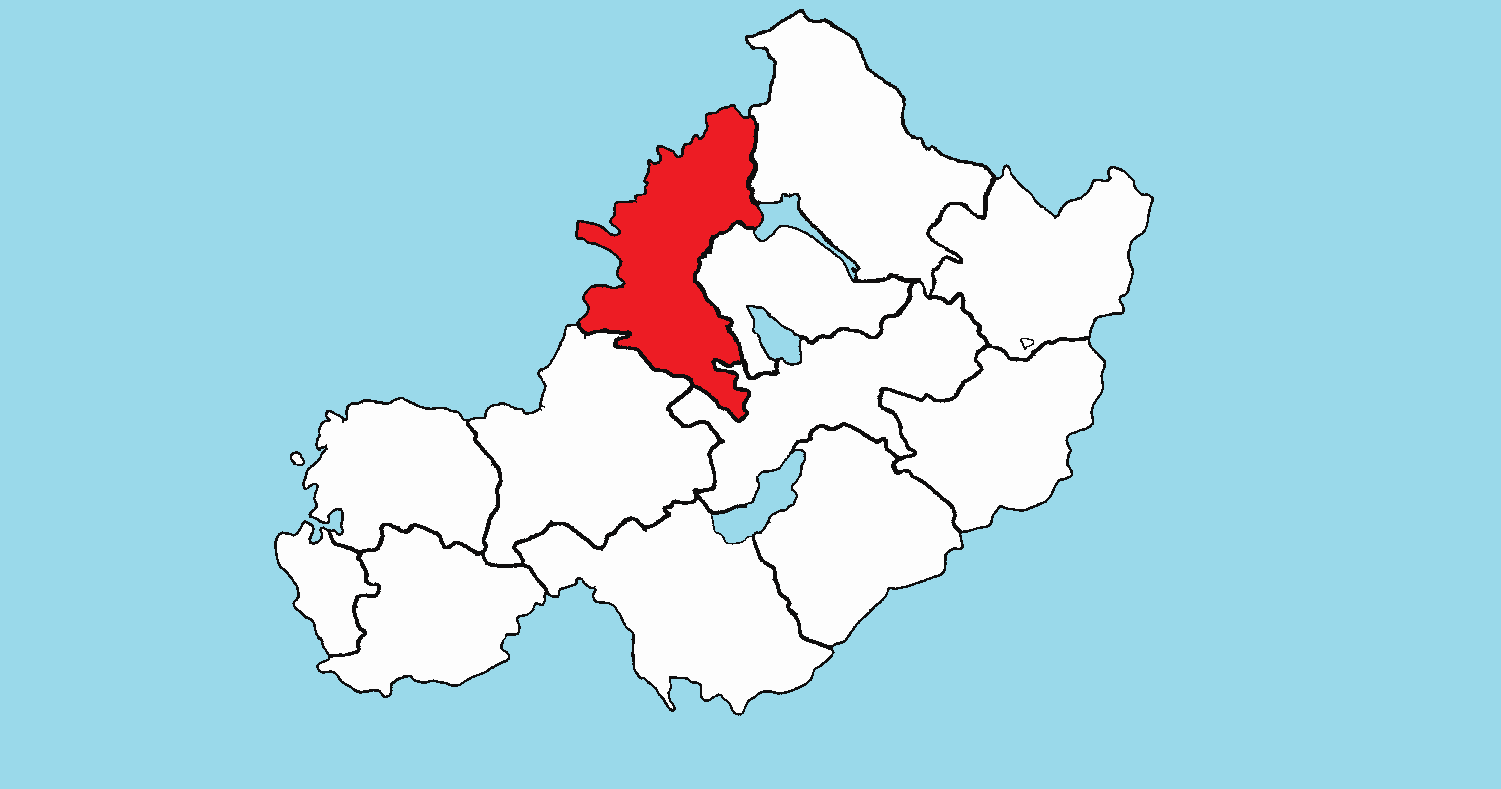
- Location of Moygoish on a map of Westmeath

- Location in Ireland
- Coordinates: 53°37′54″N 7°29′44″W
- Country: Ireland
- Province: Leinster
- County: Westmeath

Area
  - Total: 163.2 km^{2} (63.0 sq mi)
- Time zone: UTC+0 (WET)
  - Summer (DST): UTC+1 (IST (WEST))
- Irish Grid Reference: N334647

Moygoish (Irish: Uí Mhac gCuais) is a barony in north County Westmeath, in Ireland, formed by 1672. It is bordered by County Longford to the west and four other Westmeath baronies: Corkaree (to the east), Fore (to the north–east), Moyashel and Magheradernon (to the south–east) and Rathconrath to the south–west.

== Geography ==
Moygoish has an area of 40,320.4 acres (163.171 km^{2}).

The barony contains the western end of the large lake, Lough Derravaragh, and also the small lake of Lough Iron. Lough Derravaragh is shared with the baronies of Corkaree and Fore and is home to the Irish legend of the Children of Lir. Lough Iron is a small lake on the River Inny and is shared with the barony of Corkaree. The lake is not easily accessible as there is no road close to the lake or public access. The River Inny flows through Lough Iron, then near the small village of Rathowen, before it connects to the River Shannon.

The N4, a national primary road passes through the village of Rathowen, connecting Dublin with the northwest of Ireland and the coastal town of Sligo. A railway line carrying the national rail company Iarnród Éireann's Dublin to Longford commuter service and Dublin to Sligo intercity service. also passes through the barony.

The Royal Canal passes through the village of Ballynacargy connecting the River Liffey in Dublin to Longford town.

== Civil parishes of the barony ==
This table lists an historical geographical sub-division of the barony known as the civil parish (not to be confused with an Ecclesiastical parish).

Name in English	Name in Irish
Kilbixy	Cill Bhiscí
Kilmacnevan	Cill Mhic Naomháin
Rathaspick	Ráth Easpaig
Russagh	An Rosach
Street	An tSráid
Templeoran	Teampall Odhráin

== Towns, villages and townlands ==
- Ballynacargy, or Ballinacarrigy, a small village on the R393 regional road.
- Rathowen (Irish: Ráth Eoghain, meaning 'Eoghan's Ringfort'), a small village on the N4 national primary route.
- Street, a village on the L1927 local road.

There are 115 townlands in the barony of Moygoish.

== Places of interest ==
- Tristernagh Abbey, also known as the Priory of Kilbixy, is a ruined Augustinian priory founded in 1192, situated on the shores of Lough Iron.
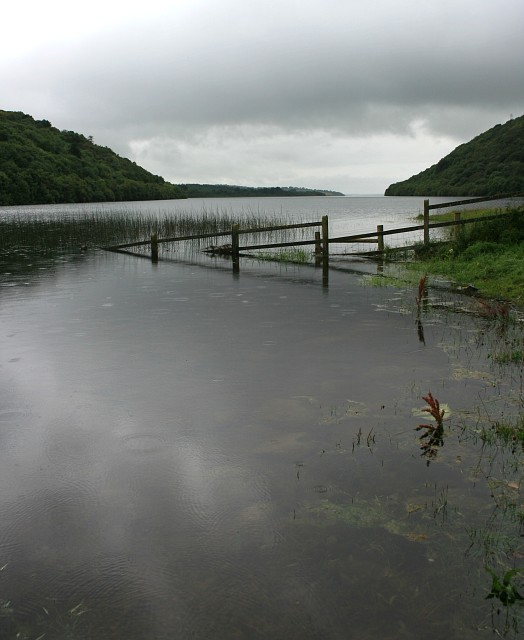
Lough Derravaragh

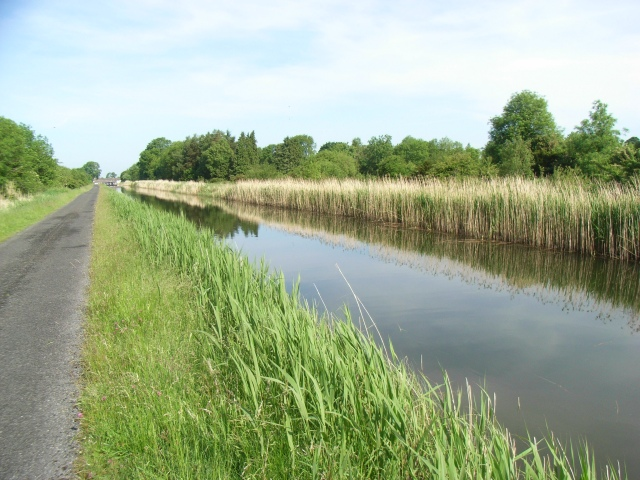
Royal Canal south–east of Ballynacargy
