= Corkaree =

Corkaree Corca Raoi
- Barony
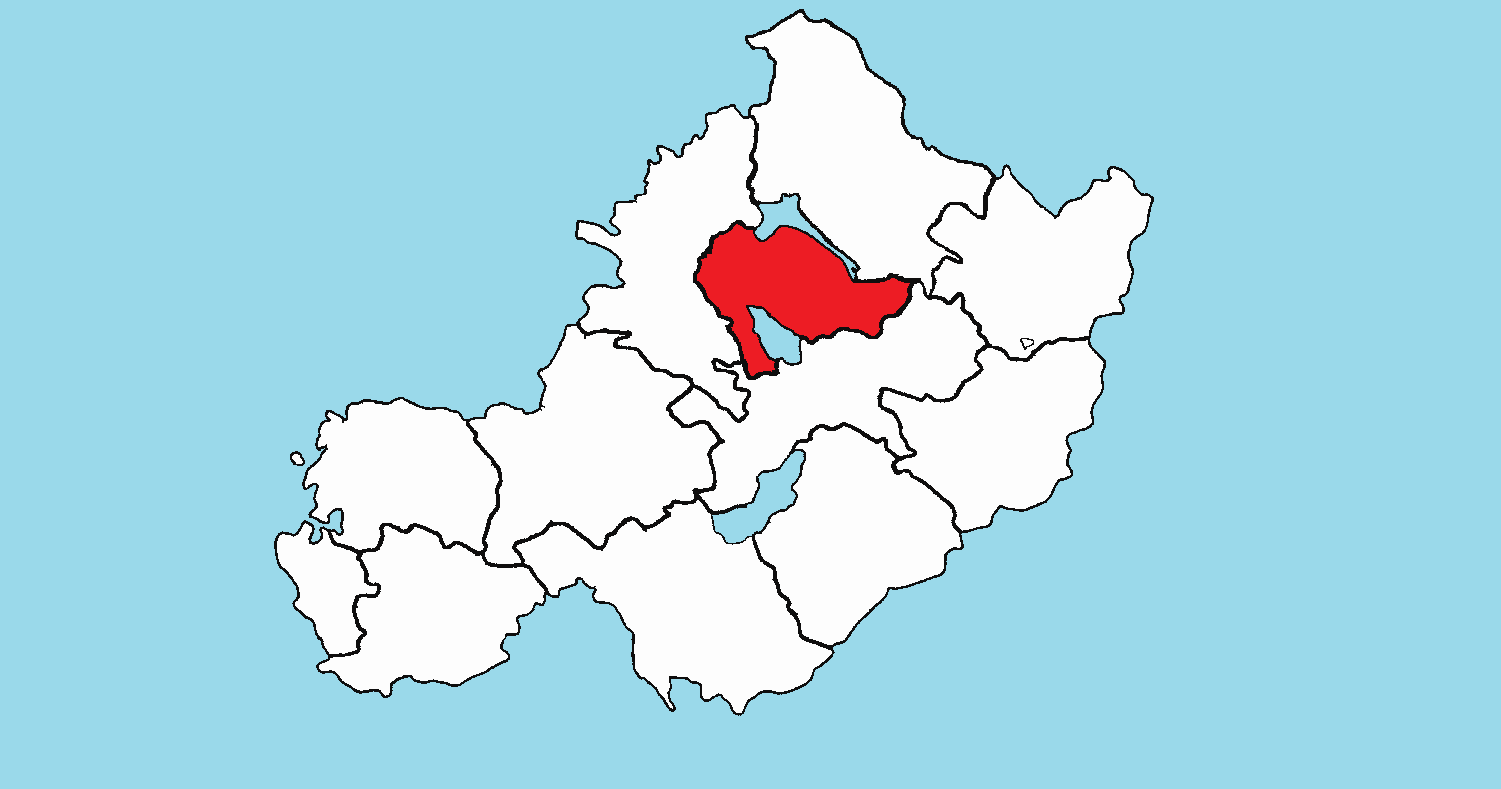
- Location of Corkaree on a map of Westmeath

- Location in Ireland
- Coordinates: 53°36′20″N 7°22′24″W
- Country: Ireland
- Province: Leinster
- County: Westmeath

Area
  - Total: 109.253 km^{2} (42.183 sq mi)
- Time zone: UTC+0 (WET)
  - Summer (DST): UTC+1 (IST (WEST))
- Irish Grid Reference: N415619

Corkaree (Irish: Corca Raoi) is a barony in north County Westmeath, Ireland. It was formed by 1672. It is bordered by three other baronies: Fore (to the north), Moyashel and Magheradernon (to the south) and Moygoish (to the west).

== Early history ==
In the Medieval period the area of Corcaree formed part of the lands held by the Ó Dálaigh (Daly) bardic family. Máel Íosa Ua Dálaigh, died 1185, was described as "Chief poet of Ireland and Scotland," he was also lord (ard taoiseach) of the 'minor midland kingdom' of Corca Raidhe (Corcaree). The annals state that in 1185, Maelisa O'Daly, ollave (chief poet) of Ireland and Scotland, Lord of Corcaree and Corca-Adain, a man illustrious for his poetry, hospitality, and nobility, died while on a pilgrimage at Clonard.

== Geography ==
Corkaree has an area of 26,996.9 acres (109.253 km^{2}).

The barony contains two large lakes; Lough Derravaragh, shared with the barony of Fore, and home to the Irish legend of the Children of Lir and Lough Owel an internationally recognised Ramsar waterfowl habitat. In addition Lough Iron, a small lake, lies on the River Inny and is shared with the barony of Moygoish. The lake is not easily accessible as there is no road close to the lake or public access.

The River Inny, flows into Lough Derravaragh, then near the village of Ballinalack. The River Brosna, rises in Lough Owel and, like the Inny, is a tributary of the River Shannon.

The N4, a national primary road passes to the north of Lough Owel, connecting Dublin with the north–west of Ireland and the coastal town of Sligo. A railway line carrying the national rail company Iarnród Éireann's Dublin to Longford commuter service and Dublin to Sligo intercity service also passes through the barony.

== Civil parishes of the barony ==
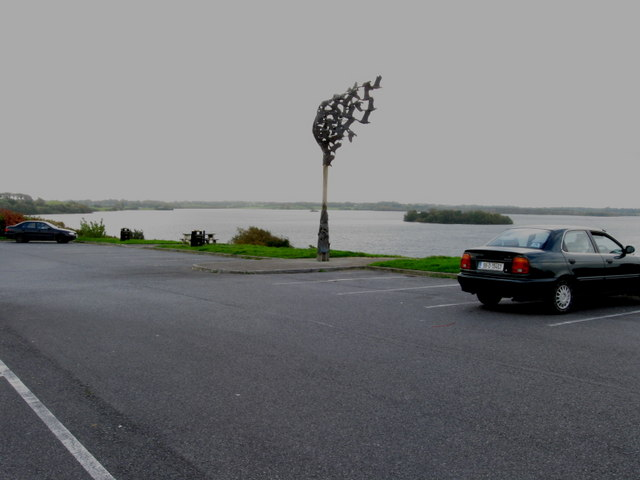
Lough Owel from Portnashangan

This table lists an historical geographical sub-division of the barony known as the civil parish (not to be confused with an Ecclesiastical parish).

Name in English	Name in Irish
Lackan	Leacain
Leny	Léine
Multyfarnham	Muilte Farannáin
Portloman	Port Lomáin
Portnashangan	Port na Seangán
Stonehall	Tigh Cloiche
Tyfarnham	Tigh Farannáin
Taghmon	Tigh Munna

== Towns, villages and townlands ==
- Ballinalack, a village on the N4 close to the River Inny.
- Bunbrosna, a village on the N4 road.
- Crookedwood, a small village on the R394
- Knockdrin, an area north of Mullingar on the R394 road.
- Monilea, Taghmon
- Multyfarnham, a village on the River Gaine.
- Taughmon, a small village on the R394 road, not to be confused with Taghmon townland.

There are 77 townlands in the barony of Corkaree.

== Places of interest ==
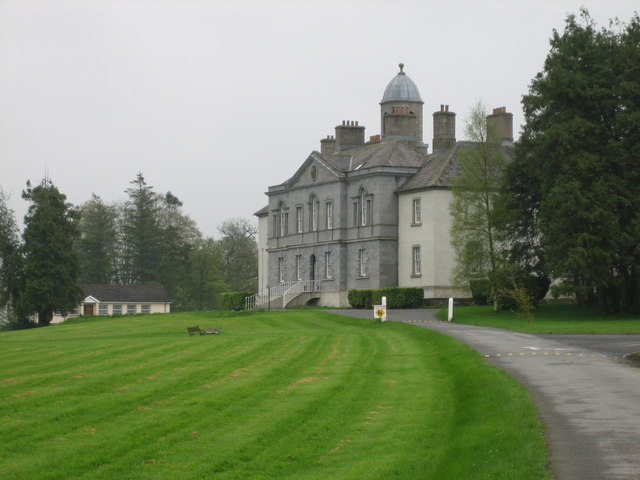
Wilson's Hospital School

- Knockdrin Castle, mainly an early 19th-century neo-Gothic structure.
- Multyfarnham Friary, a Franciscan friary founded in the 15th century.
- Wilson's Hospital School, founded in 1761 by Andrew Wilson as a school for young Protestant boys and also as a hospital for old men, some of whom were retired soldiers; now a co-educational boarding school.
