= Martinstown =

Martinstown may refer to:

== Island of Ireland ==
- Martinstown, County Antrim, Northern Ireland
- Martinstown, Delvin, a townland in the civil parish of Delvin, barony of Delvin, County Westmeath, Republic of Ireland
- Martinstown, Lickbla, a townland in the civil parish of Lickbla, barony of Fore, County Westmeath, Republic of Ireland
- Martinstown, St. Mary's, a townland in the civil parish of St. Mary's, barony of Fore, County Westmeath, Republic of Ireland
- Martinstown, Stonehall, a townland in Stonehall civil parish, barony of Corkaree, County Westmeath, Republic of Ireland

== Elsewhere ==
- Martinstown, Missouri, a community in the United States
- Winterborne St Martin, Dorset, England, commonly known as Martinstown
