= Rathconnell (civil parish) =

Civil parish in County Westmeath, Ireland

Rathconnell Rú Chonaill
- Civil parish
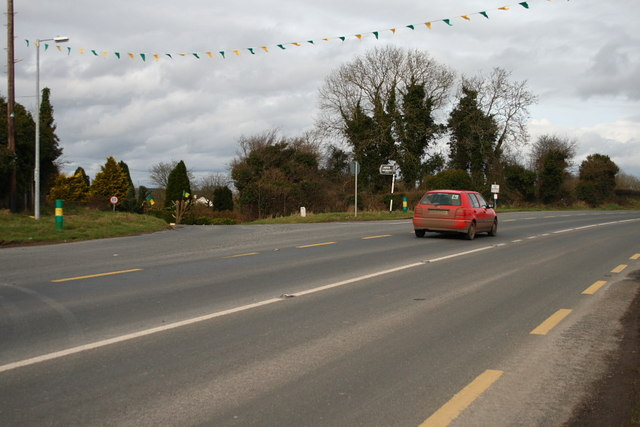
- N52 road through Rathconnell

- Location of Rathconnell within County Westmeath, Ireland
- Coordinates: 53°33′42″N 7°13′51″W
- Country: Ireland
- Province: Leinster
- County: County Westmeath
- Irish grid reference: N510571

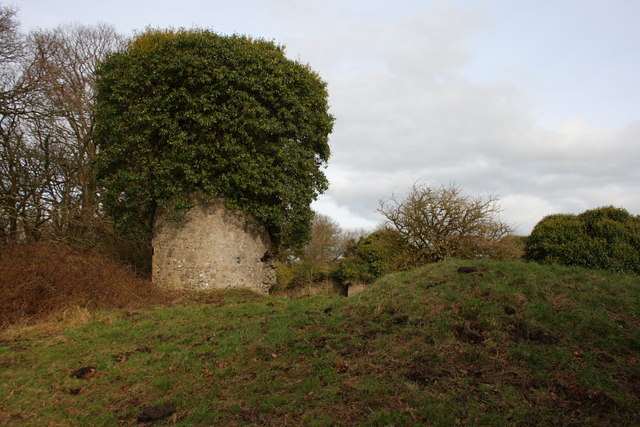
Motte and tower near Rathconnell Castle

Rathconnell (Irish: Rú Chonaill) is a civil parish in County Westmeath, Ireland. It is located about 9 km (6 mi) north–east of Mullingar on the N52 road.

Rathconnell is one of 3 civil parishes in the barony of Moyashel and Magheradernon in the province of Leinster. The civil parish covers 16,206.9 acres (65.587 km^{2}).

Rathconnell civil parish comprises 34 townlands: Aghadaugh, Ballycor, Ballynagall, Balrath North, Balrath West, Balreagh, Balreath East, Brittas, Cartron, Cloghanumera, Clondalever, Clonickilvant, Clonkill, Clonlost, Clonsheever, Cooksborough, Crosserdree, Curraghbrack, Curraghmore, Drinmore, Edmondstown, Fennor, Jeffrystown, Killynan (Cooke), Killynan (Pratt), Knockdrin, Loughagar Beg, Loughagar More, Macetown, Moneylea, Mountrobert, Rathconnell, Reynella and Tevrin.

The neighbouring civil parishes are: Kilpatrick (barony of Fore), and Tyfarnham to the north, Killulagh (barony of Delvin), to the north–east, Killagh (Delvin) to the east, Killucan (barony of Farbill) to the south–east and south, Mullingar to the south–west and west and Portnashangan (barony of Corkaree) to the north–west.
