= Killua =

Killua may refer to:

== Places ==
=== Ireland ===
- Killua Castle, Clonmellon, County Westmeath
- Killua (civil parish), a civil parish in the barony of Delvin, County Westmeath
- Killua, County Westmeath, a townland in the barony of Delvin

== Other ==
- Killua (singer), Albanian singer and songwriter
- Killua Zoldyck, a character from the manga series Hunter × Hunter by Yoshihiro Togashi
