= Killulagh (civil parish) =

Civil parish in County Westmeath, Ireland

Killulagh Cill Uailleach
- Civil parish
- Location of Killulagh within County Westmeath in Ireland
- Coordinates: 53°35′11″N 7°7′24″W
- Country: Ireland
- Province: Leinster
- County: County Westmeath
- Irish grid reference: N580599

Killulagh (Irish: Cill Uailleach) is a civil parish in County Westmeath, Ireland. It is located about 16 kilometres (10 mi) north–east of Mullingar.

Killulagh is one of 7 civil parishes in the barony of Delvin in the province of Leinster. The civil parish covers 7,588.8 acres (30.711 km^{2}).

Killulagh civil parish comprises 17 townlands, and the neighbouring civil parishes include: Delvin, Kilcumny and St. Feighin's (barony of Fore) to the north, Killaconnigan (barony of Lune, County Meath) to the east, Killagh, Killucan and Rathconnell (barony of Moyashel and Magheradernon) to the south and Kilpatrick (barony of Fore) to the west.
