= Cooksborough =

Cooksborough Maigh gCuilinn
- Townland
- Location of Cooksborough within County Westmeath in the Republic of Ireland
- Coordinates: 53°32′17″N 7°14′21″W
- Country: Ireland
- Province: Leinster
- County: County Westmeath
- Irish grid reference: N504544

Cooksborough (Irish: Maigh gCuilinn) is a townland in County Westmeath, Ireland. It is located about 7.1 kilometres (4 mi) east of Mullingar.

Cooksborough is one of 34 townlands of the civil parish of Rathconnell in the barony of Moyashel and Magheradernon in the Province of Leinster. The townland covers 921.54 acres (3.7293 km^{2}).

The neighbouring townlands are: Cloghanumera, Killynan (Cooke) and Mountrobert to the north, Clonickilvant to the east, Castledown and Wood Down (barony of Farbill) to the south and Macetown to the west.

In the 1911 census of Ireland there were 9 houses and 47 inhabitants in the townland.
