= Martinstown Castle =

Ruined tower house in County Westmeath, Ireland

Coordinates: 53°35′24″N 7°05′06″W

The ruins of the Martinstown Castle tower house

Martinstown Castle is a ruined castle located in the townland of Martinstown, south of Delvin, County Westmeath, Ireland. The ruin consists of a three-story tower with an interior staircase. Due to similarities with Talbot's Castle in Trim, County Meath, the castle is believed to date back to the 15th century.

== See also ==
- Delvin (civil parish)
