= Foyran =

Civil parish in County Westmeath, Ireland

Foyran Faobhrán
- Civil parish
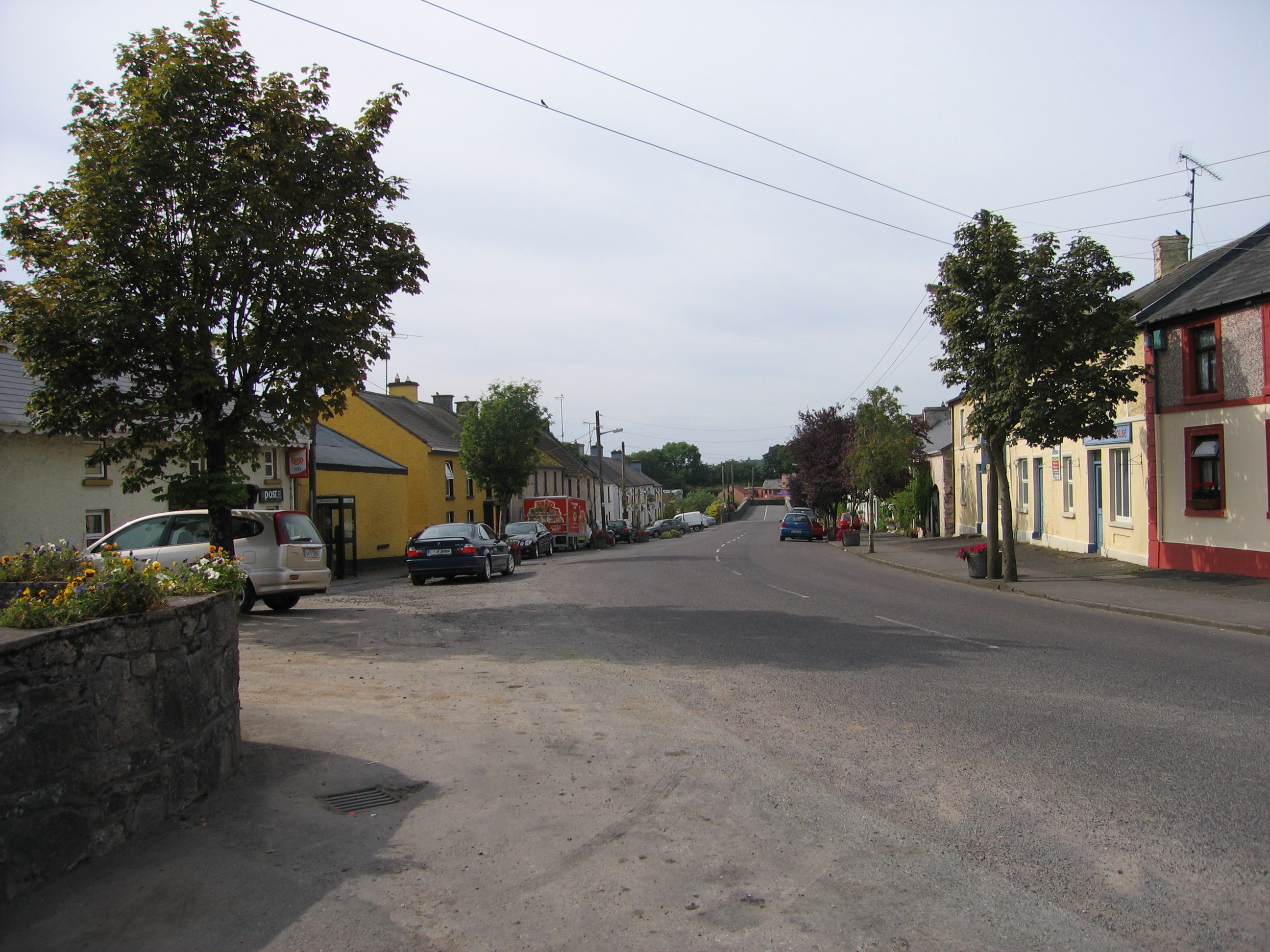
- Finnea village

- Location of Foyran in County Westmeath, Ireland
- Coordinates: 53°46′12″N 7°19′48″W
- Country: Ireland
- Province: Leinster
- County: County Westmeath
- Irish grid reference: N442802

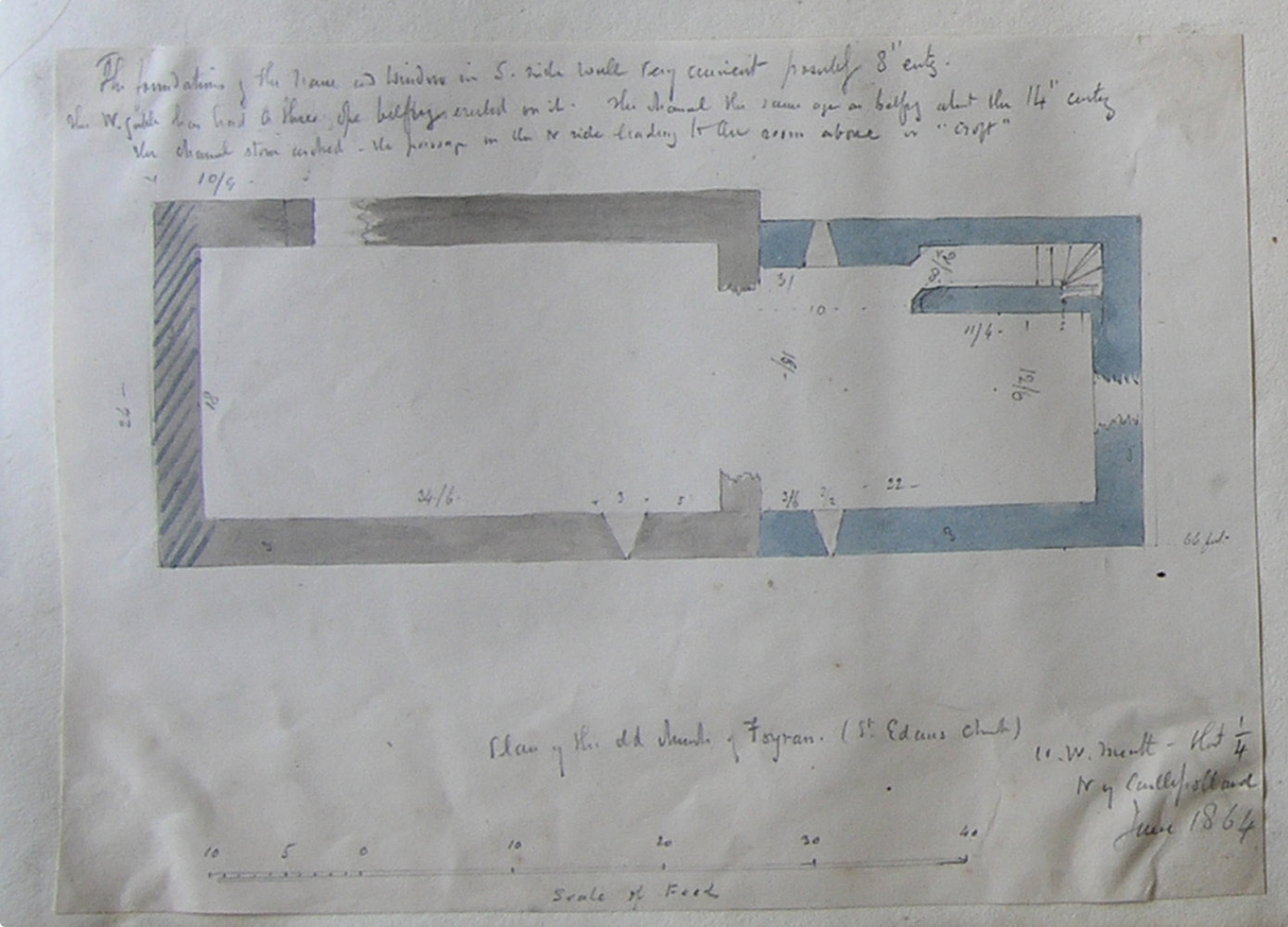
Foyran church plan by du Noyer in 1864

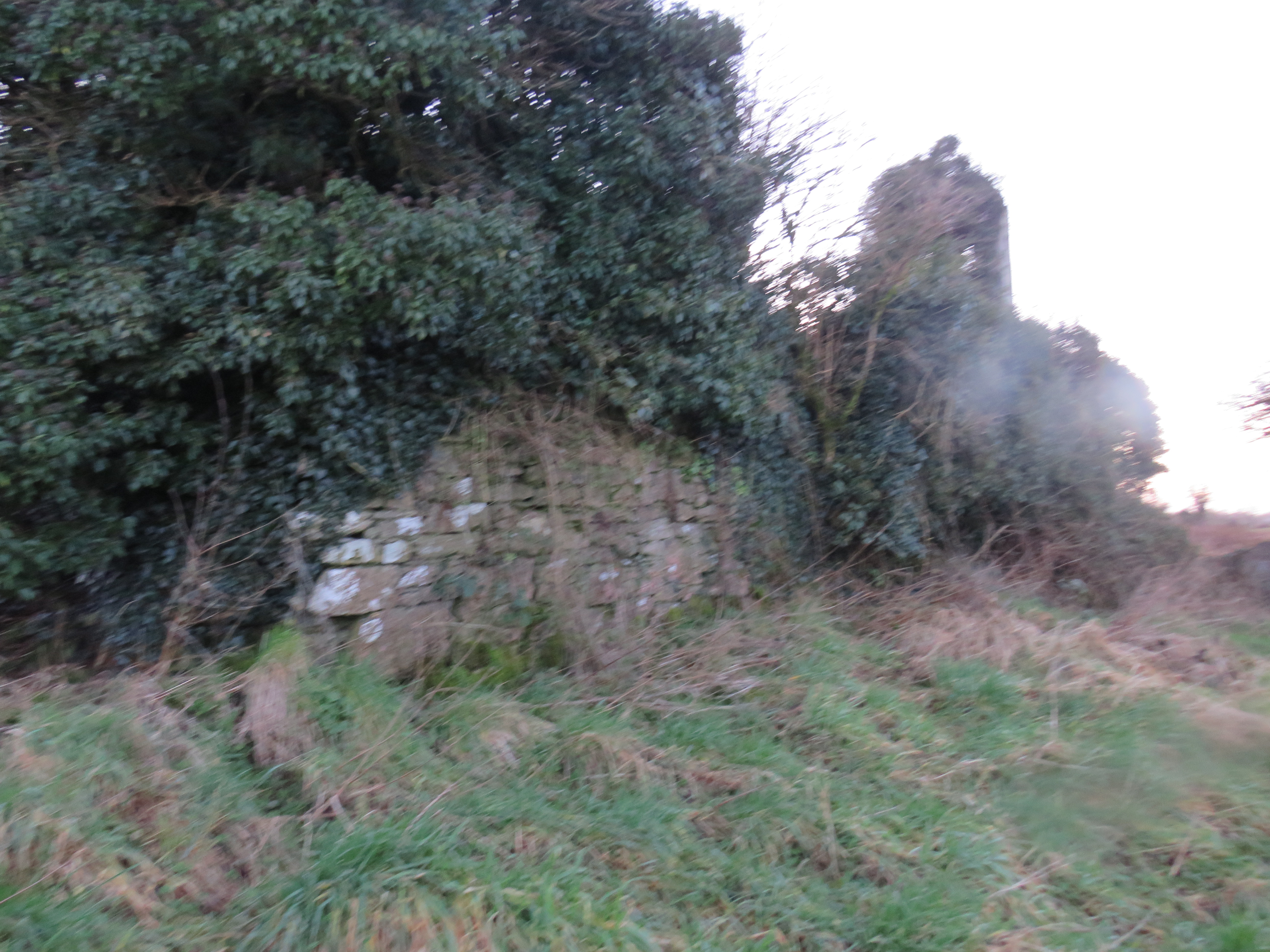
The south wall of Foyran church showing different phases of construction

Foyran (Irish: Faobhrán possibly pertaining to a well, Tobar), is a historic monument, religious parish, and townland, civil parish in County Westmeath, Ireland. It is located about 27 km (17 mi) north of Mullingar.

Foyran is one of 8 civil parishes in the barony of Fore in the province of Leinster. The civil parish covers 6,249.3 acres (25.290 km^{2}).

Foyran civil parish comprises the small village of Finnea and 20 townlands: Ballynascarry, Carn, Clareisland or Derrymacegan, Cornacreevy, Derrymacegan or Clareisland, Finnea, Foyran, Lisnugent, Money, Moneybeg, Mullaghmeen, Rathshane, Togher, Tonyowen Lower, Tonyowen Upper, Tullyhill, Tullystown and Williamstown.

The neighbouring civil parishes are: Ballymachugh, Drumlumman and Kilbride (all County Cavan) to the north, Killeagh (County Meath) to the east, Lickbla, Rathgarve and St. Feighin's to the south and Abbeylara (County Longford) to the west.
