= Clondalever, Kilpatrick =

Townland in County Westmeath, Ireland

Clondalever
- Townland
- Location of Clondalever within County Westmeath in the Republic of Ireland
- Coordinates: 53°36′38″N 7°13′33″W
- Country: Ireland
- Province: Leinster
- County: County Westmeath
- Irish grid reference: N512625

Clondalever is a townland in County Westmeath, Ireland. It is located about 12 1/3 kilometres (8 miles) north–east of Mullingar.

Clondalever is one of 3 townlands of the civil parish of Kilpatrick in the barony of Fore in the Province of Leinster. The townland covers 508.60 acres (2.0582 km^{2}). The neighbouring townlands are: Kilpatrick to the north, Rickardstown to the north–east, Gigginstown to the south–east, Balreagh to the south, Clondalever to the south, Taghmon, to the south, Tuitestown to the west and Derrynagaragh to the north–west.

In the 1911 census of Ireland there were 6 houses and 22 inhabitants in the townland.
