= Clonarney (civil parish) =

Civil parish in County Westmeath, Ireland

Clonarney Cluain Earna
- Civil parish
- Location of Clonarney in County Westmeath, Ireland
- Coordinates: 53°38′31″N 7°6′19″W
- Country: Ireland
- Province: Leinster
- County: County Westmeath
- Irish grid reference: N592661

Clonarney (Irish: Cluain Earna) is a civil parish in County Westmeath, Ireland. It is located about 20 km (12 mi) north–east of Mullingar.

Clonarney is one of 7 civil parishes in the barony of Delvin in the province of Leinster. The civil parish covers 2,314.5 acres (9.366 km^{2}).

Clonarney civil parish comprises 5 townlands: Clonarney, Mulliganstown, Scurlockstown, Sheepstown and Stonestown.

The neighbouring civil parishes are: Killallon County Meath to the north, Delvin to the north, east and south, Kilcumny and St. Mary's to the west.
