= Kilpatrick, Fore =

Kilpatrick
- Townland
- Location of Kilpatrick within County Westmeath in the Republic of Ireland
- Coordinates: 53°37′1″N 7°14′55″W
- Country: Ireland
- Province: Leinster
- County: County Westmeath
- Irish grid reference: N517638

Kilpatrick is a townland in County Westmeath, Ireland. It is located about 13.58 kilometres (8 mi) north–east of Mullingar.

Kilpatrick is one of 3 townlands of the civil parish of Kilpatrick in the barony of Fore in the Province of Leinster. The townland covers 845.07 acres (3.4199 km^{2}). The neighbouring townlands are: Barbavilla Demesne to the north, Rickardstown to the east, Clondalever to the south, Derrynagaragh to the west and Ballybeg to the north–west.

In the 1911 census of Ireland there were 21 houses and 96 inhabitants in the townland.
