= St. Feighin's =

Civil parish in County Westmeath, Ireland

- Civil parish
- Location of St. Feighin's within County Westmeath, Ireland
- Coordinates: 53°40′48″N 7°14′32″W
- Country: Ireland
- Province: Leinster
- County: County Westmeath
- Irish grid reference: N501702

St. Feighin's is a civil parish in County Westmeath, Ireland. It is located about 19 km (12 mi) north–north–east of Mullingar.

St. Feighin's is one of 8 civil parishes in the barony of Fore in the province of Leinster. The civil parish covers 10,865.7 acres (43.972 km^{2}).

St. Feighin's civil parish comprises 20 townlands: Ballany, Barbavilla Demesne, Ben, Benisonlodge or Bratty, Bratty or Benisonlodge, Carpenterstown, Clonnageeragh, Collinstown, Corbally, Deerpark, Fore, Gillardstown, Hammondstown and Tonaghmore, Hilltown, Lakill and Moortown, Loughanavagh or Newpark, Loughpark, Moortown and Lakill, Newpark or Loughanavagh, Ranaghan, Templanstown, Tonaghmore and Hammondstown, Tonashammer and Windtown

The neighbouring civil parishes are: Killeagh and Moylagh (both County Meath) and Foyran to the north, Kilcumny and St. Mary's to the east, Killulagh and Kilpatrick to the south, Faughalstown to the south and west and Rathgarve to the west.
