= Ballinlough =

Ballinlough (Irish: Baile an Locha, meaning 'town of the lake') could refer to one of the following places in Ireland:

- Ballinlough, Bunown, a townland in the civil parish of Bunown, barony of Kilkenny West, County Westmeath
- Ballinlough, Cork, a suburb of Cork city
- Ballinlough, County Meath, an electoral division near Kells
- Ballinlough, County Roscommon, a village
- Ballinlough, Killua, a townland in the civil parish of Killua, barony of Delvin, County Westmeath

- Ballinlough Castle, a 17th-century country house in Killua, County Westmeath
