= Tuitestown, Kilpatrick =

Tuitestown
- Townland
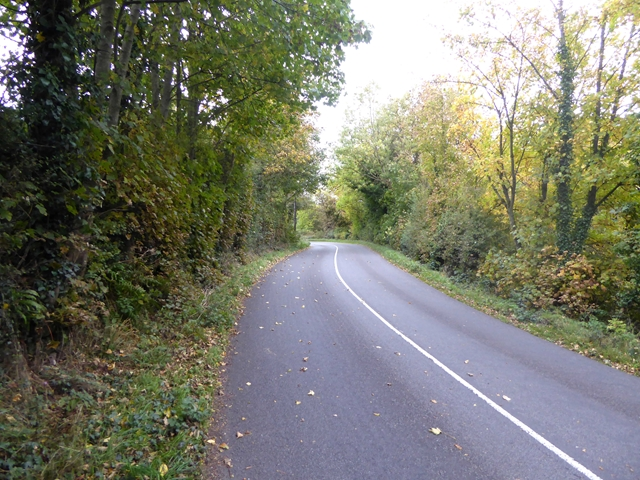
- Country road separating Tuitestown (right) and Gartlandstown (left) townlands

- Location of Tuitestown within County Westmeath in the Republic of Ireland
- Coordinates: 53°37′1″N 7°14′55″W
- Country: Ireland
- Province: Leinster
- County: County Westmeath
- Irish grid reference: N497632

Tuitestown is a townland in County Westmeath, Ireland. It is located about12.03 kilometres (7 mi) north–north–east of Mullingar.

Tuitestown is one of 3 townlands of the civil parish of Kilpatrick in the barony of Fore in the Province of Leinster. The townland covers 544.34 acres (2.2029 km^{2}). The neighbouring townlands are: Derrynagaragh to the north, Clondalever to the east, Taghmon to the south and Gartlandstown to the west.

In the 1911 census of Ireland there were 7 houses and 41 inhabitants in the townland.
