= Kilcumny (civil parish) =

Civil parish in County Westmeath, Ireland

Kilcumny Cill Chuimne
- Civil parish
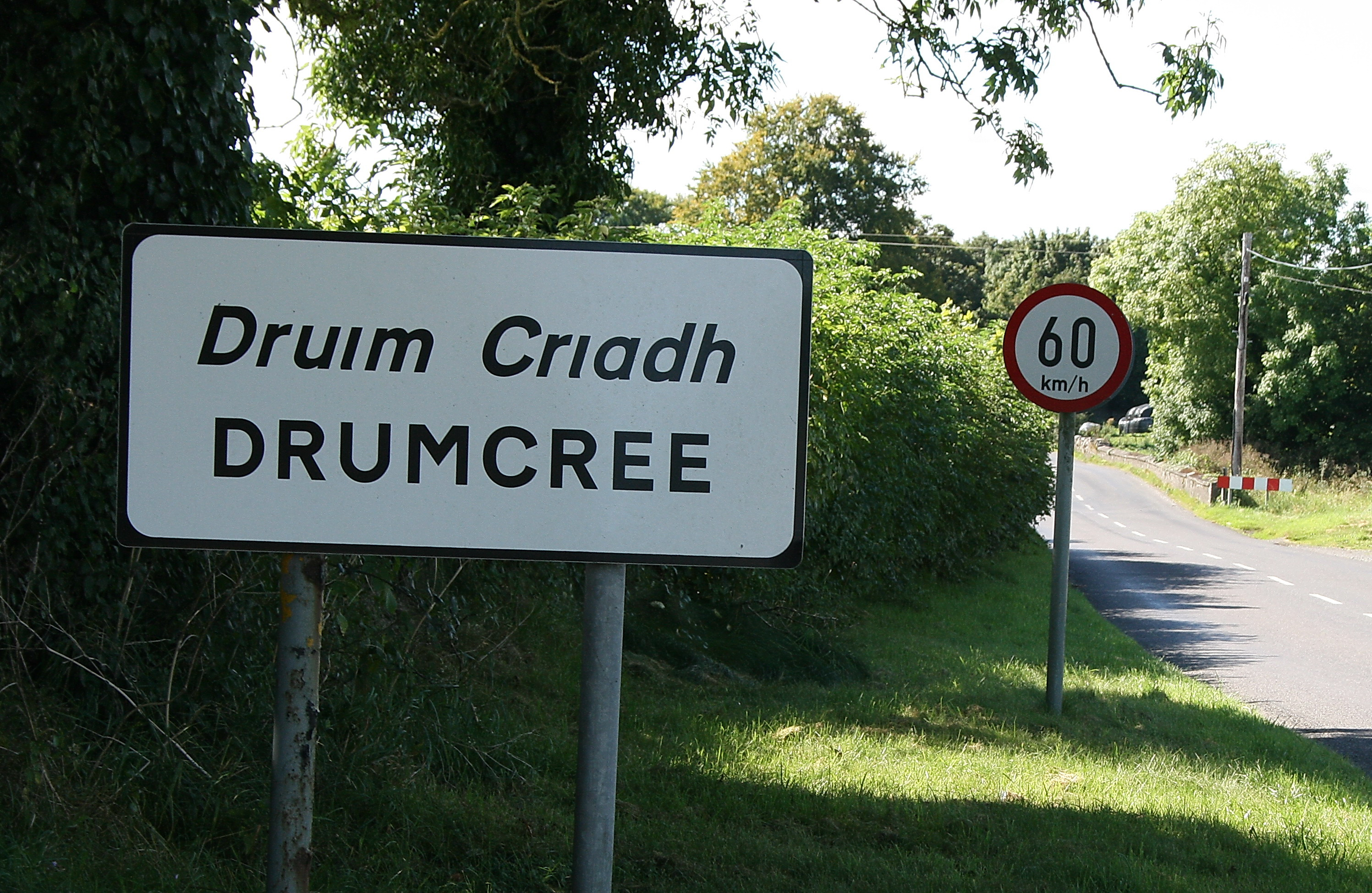
- Entering Drumcree village

- Location of Kilcumny in County Westmeath, Ireland
- Coordinates: 53°38′22″N 7°10′48″W
- Country: Ireland
- Province: Leinster
- County: County Westmeath
- Irish grid reference: N542658

Kilcumny (Irish: Cill Chuimne) is a civil parish in County Westmeath, Ireland. It is located about 17 km (11 mi) north–north–east of Mullingar.

Kilcumny is one of 7 civil parishes in the barony of Delvin in the province of Leinster. The civil parish covers 2,920.9 acres (11.820 km^{2}).

Kilcumny civil parish comprises 13 townlands: Ballymacahil and Derries, Ballynagall, Bananstown, Kilcumny, Cooleighter, Drumcree, Glananea or Ralphsdale, Gormanstown, Grangestown, Johnstown, Kilwalter, Loughstown and Robinstown.

The neighbouring civil parishes are: St. Marys (barony of Fore) to the north, Clonarney and Delvin to the east, Killulagh to the south and St. Feighin's (Fore) to the west.
