= Clonkill =

Townland in County Westmeath, Ireland

- Townland
- Location of Clonkill within County Westmeath in the Republic of Ireland
- Coordinates: 53°34′31″N 7°15′9″W
- Country: Ireland
- Province: Leinster
- County: County Westmeath
- Irish grid reference: N495586

Clonkill is a townland in County Westmeath, Ireland. It is located about 8.26 kilometres (5 mi) north–east of Mullingar.

Clonkill is one of 34 townlands of the civil parish of Rathconnell in the barony of Moyashel and Magheradernon in the Province of Leinster. The townland covers 792.45 acres (3.2069 km^{2}).

The neighbouring townlands are: Downs to the north, Balreagh to the north–east, Killynan (Cooke) to the east, Loughagar More to the south, Toberaquill to the west and Monkstown to the north–west.

In the 1911 census of Ireland there were 15 houses and 62 inhabitants in the townland.
