= Balreagh =

- Townland
- Location of Balreagh within County Westmeath in the Republic of Ireland
- Coordinates: 53°35′14″N 7°13′47″W
- Country: Ireland
- Province: Leinster
- County: County Westmeath

Area
  - Total: 3.3 km^{2} (1.3 sq mi)
- Irish grid reference: N510599

Balreagh is a townland in County Westmeath, Ireland. It is located about 10.26 kilometres (6 mi) north–east of Mullingar.

Balreagh is one of 34 townlands of the civil parish of Rathconnell in the barony of Moyashel and Magheradernon in the Province of Leinster. The townland covers 828.14 acres (3.3514 km^{2}).

The neighbouring townlands are: Clondalever (Taghmon), Clondalever (Kilpatrick) and Gigginstown to the north, Jeffrystown, Edmondstown and Killynan (Pratt) to the east, Killynan (Cooke) and Clonkill to the south, Downs and Rathcorbally to the west and Taghmon to the north–west.

In the 1911 census of Ireland there were 14 houses and 51 inhabitants in the townland.
