= Kilcumny =

Kilcumny Cill Chuimne
- Townland
- Location of Kilcumny within County Westmeath in the Republic of Ireland
- Coordinates: 53°37′45″N 7°11′18″W
- Country: Ireland
- Province: Leinster
- County: County Westmeath
- Irish grid reference: N537646

Kilcumny (Irish: Cill Chuimne) is a townland in County Westmeath, Ireland. It is located about 15.53 kilometres (10 mi) north–east of Mullingar.

Kilcumny is one of 13 townlands of the civil parish of Kilcumny in the barony of Delvin in the Province of Leinster. The townland covers 250.22 acres (1.0126 km^{2}).

The neighbouring townlands are: Glananea or Ralphsdale to the north, Kilwalter to the north–east, Ballymacahill and Derries to the east, Barbavilla Demesne to the south and west and Robinstown to the north–west.

In the 1911 census of Ireland there were 12 houses and 36 inhabitants in the townland.
