= Killagh (civil parish) =

Civil parish in County Westmeath, Ireland

- Civil parish
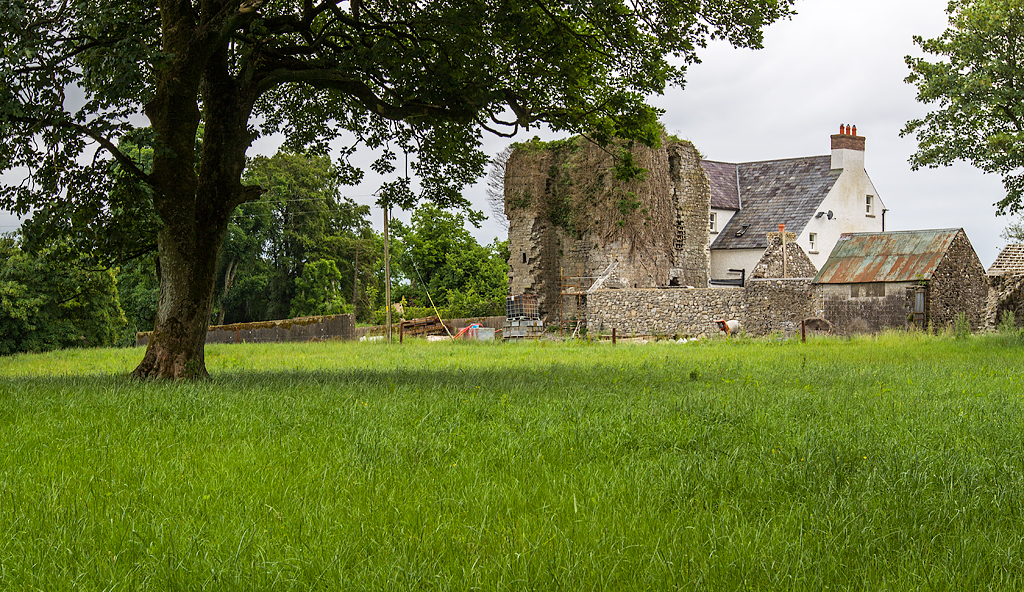
- Castle in Killagh

- Location of Killagh within County Westmeath in the Republic of Ireland
- Coordinates: 53°33′48″N 7°7′20″W
- Country: Ireland
- Province: Leinster
- County: County Westmeath
- Irish grid reference: N582573

Killagh is a civil parish in County Westmeath, Ireland. It is located about 15.29 kilometres (10 mi) east–north–east of Mullingar.

Killagh is one of 7 civil parishes in the barony of Delvin in the province of Leinster. The civil parish covers 2,005.6 acres (8.116 km^{2}).

Killagh civil parish comprises six townlands, and the neighbouring civil parishes include: Killulagh to the north, Killucan to the south and Rathconnell (barony of Moyashel and Magheradernon) to the west.
