= Cill Fhíonáin =

Cill Fhíonáin or similar names may refer to:

- Kilfinane, County Limerick, Ireland, a small town
- Killynan (Cooke), County Westmeath, Ireland, a townland
- Kilfinan, Argyll and Bute, Scotland, a hamlet
