= Rathgarve =

Civil parish in County Westmeath, Ireland

Rathgarve Ráth Garbh
- Civil parish
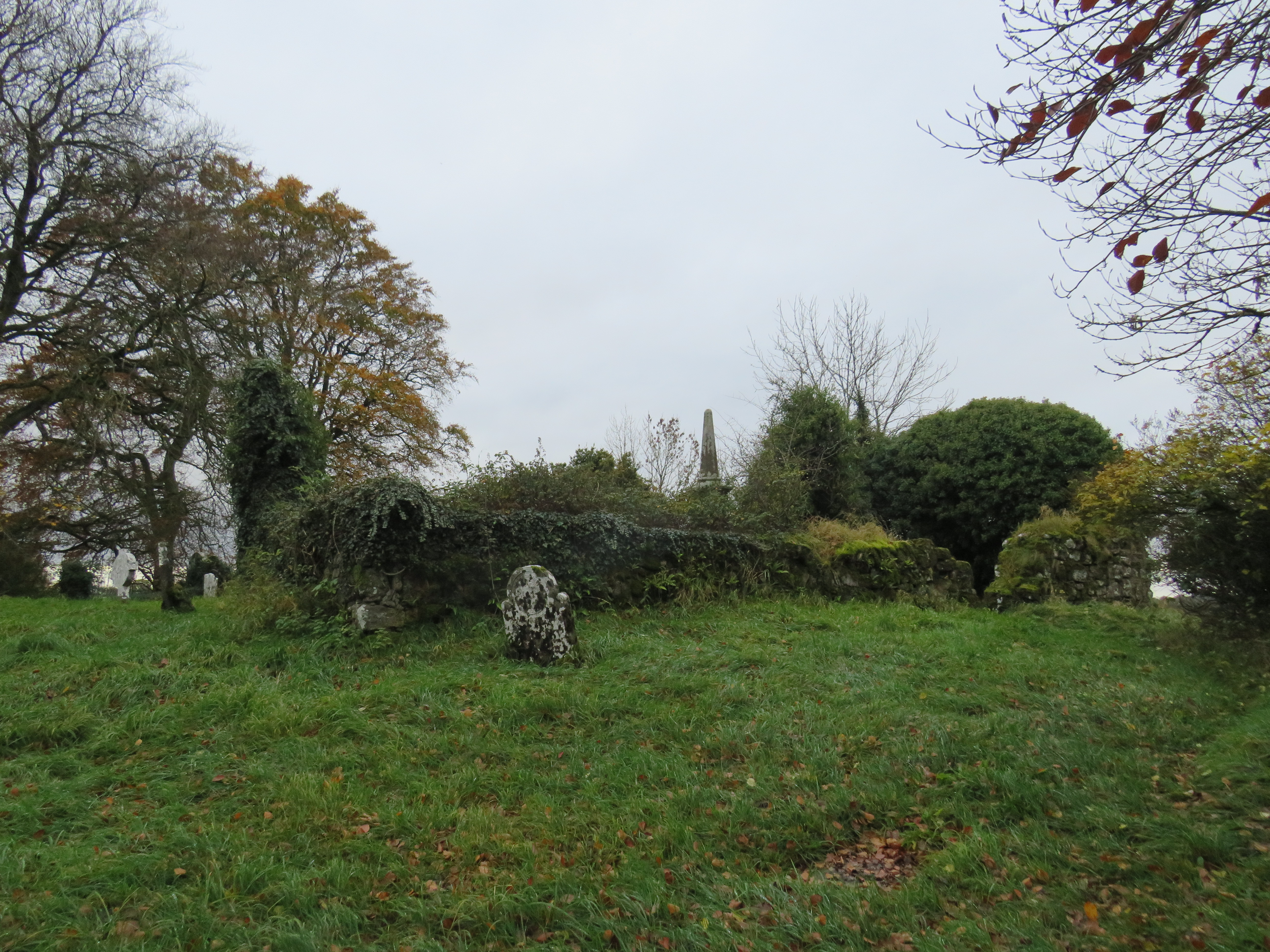
- Rathgarve's medieval church

- Location of Rathgarve within County Westmeath, Ireland
- Coordinates: 53°46′12″N 7°19′48″W
- Country: Ireland
- Province: Leinster
- County: County Westmeath
- Irish grid reference: N469719

Rathgarve (Irish: Ráth Garbh meaning "rough ringfort"), is a civil, religious parish, and townland, in County Westmeath, Ireland, located about 19 km (12 mi) north of Mullingar. It takes in parts of the modern town of Castlepollard (the townlands of Kinturk Desmesne and Townparks), and it forms part of the religious parish of St. Michael's Parish, Castlepollard. Historically it has been linked to the 8th century monk Dicuil, according to Monasticon Hibernicum. However, he is also associated with Rathgar ( also in Irish: Ráth Garbh, again meaning "rough ringfort"), in Dublin, which may indicate a misassociation with one of these sites.

It is thought that Rathgarve (along with Foyran) was established as a manor around 1211 or 1212 which is the attested date for the establishment of the nearby manor of Lickbla, at which time the grant of churches and lands was confirmed in 1206-1207 by M. Uí Dobailen, Bishop of Kells (later to become part of the Diocese of Meath). From the tithe allocations, Rathgarve attracted tithes of 100s. or £5 (parish and vicarage). Of this, the vicar received 33s./4d. or one third. The first complete list of parishes comes in the early fourteenth century, and Rathgarve is found in the deanery of Fore.

Rathgarve is one of eight civil parishes in the barony of Fore in the province of Leinster. The civil parish covers 6,258.7 acres (25.328 km^{2}).

Rathgarve civil parish comprises the town of Castlepollard and 27 townlands: Ballycomoyle, Ballymanus, Ballynagall, Caslanakirka, Curraghboy, Deerpark, Drumman, Freaghmore, Glen, Kinturk Demesne, Knockroe, Loughanalla, Loughanstown, Millcastle, Mullanakill, Raheen Beg, Raheen More, (the townland of) Rathgarve, Robinstown Lower, Robinstown Upper, Sheskernagh, Slieveboy, Srunahella, Stonestown, Teevrevagh, Townparks and Tromra.

The neighbouring civil parishes are: Foyran to the north, St. Feighin's to the east, Faughalstown to the south and Lickbla and Mayne to the west.

As with Foyran and Lickbla, the current extant remains are of an early medieval church set within a possible earlier early Christian enclosure, adjoined by a motte & bailey. Rathgarve, in addition is located near the ruins of a mill/castle complex at Millcastle which would have included a bridge over the River Glore (running from Lough Glore to the River Inney) as evidenced by Ordnance Survey maps of circa 1900.

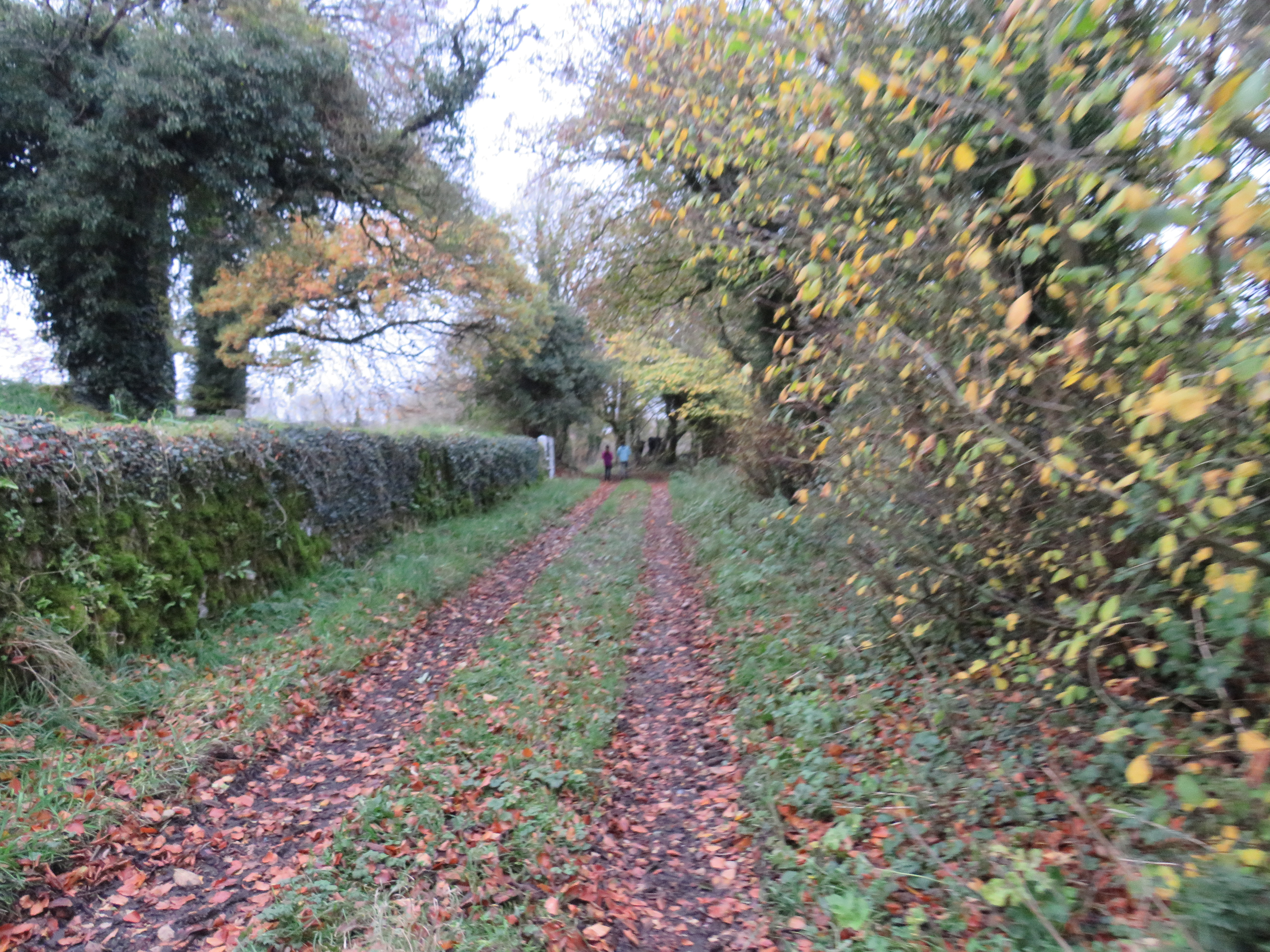
Rathgarve medieval trackway at Rathgarve medieval church.

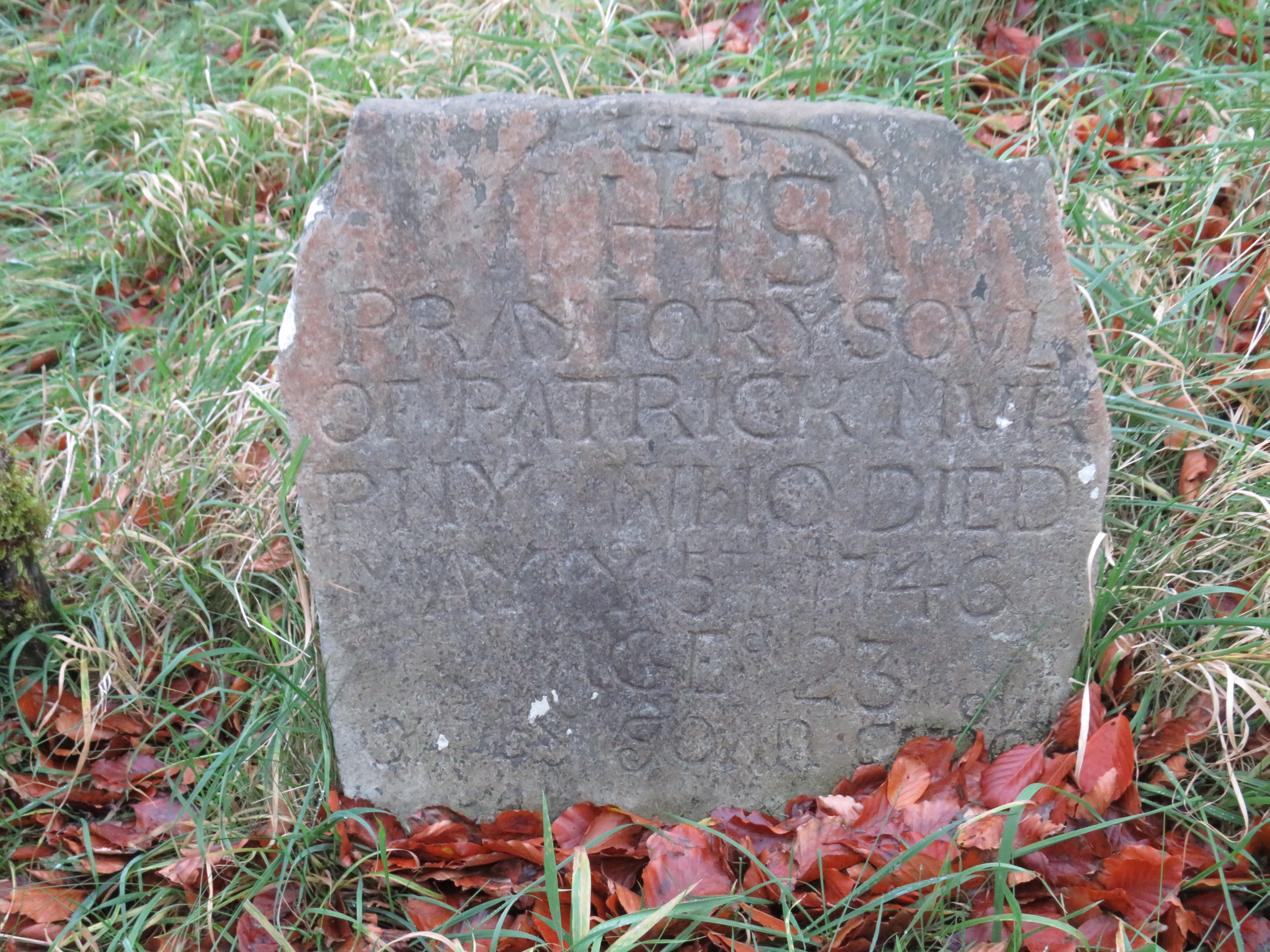
Patrick Murphy's memorial, 1746 at Rathgarve.

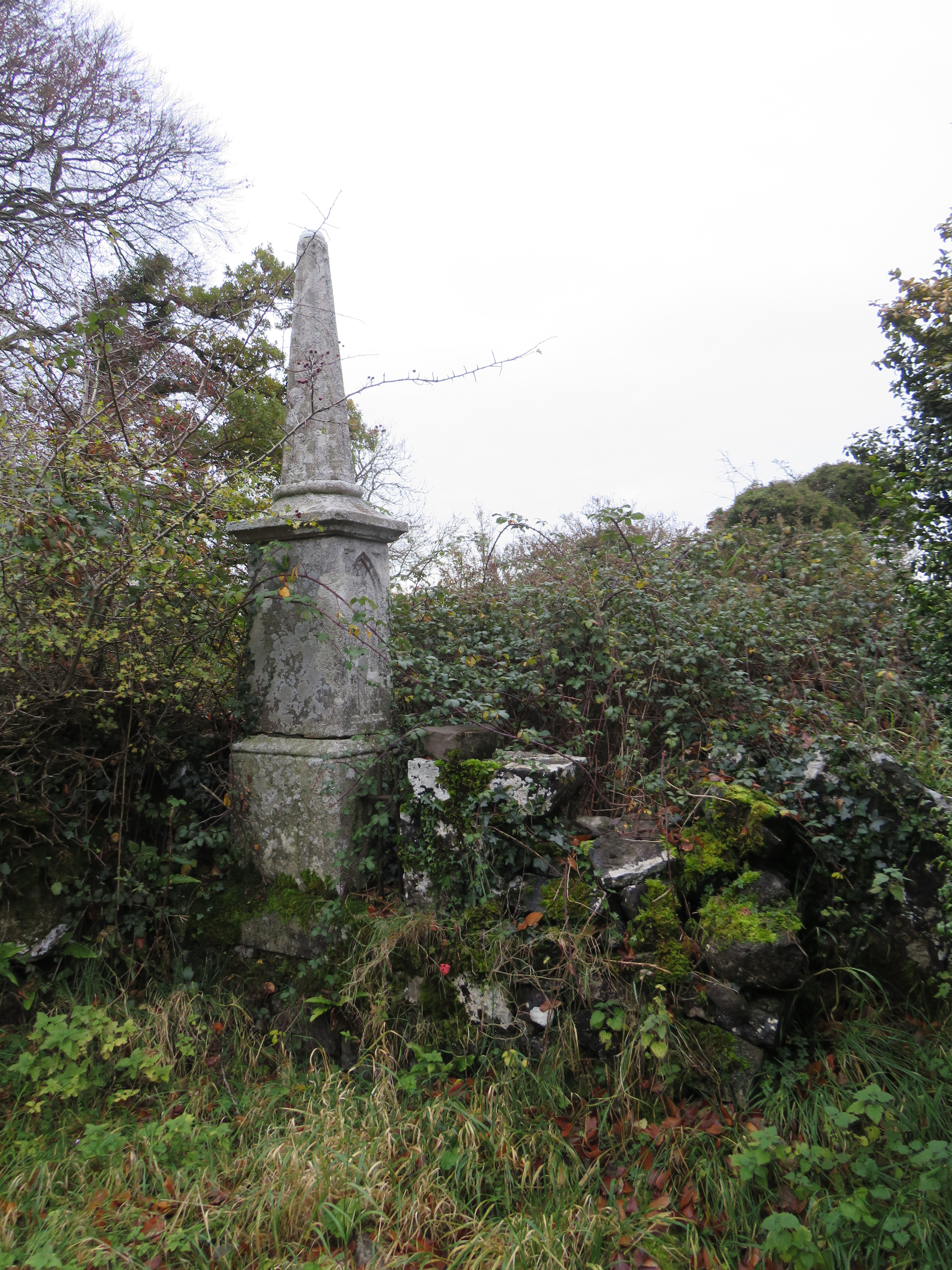
Rathgarve Church monument in the interior of the church.

A medieval trackway (on private land) delineates the former route from the south heading towards the abbey of Lara (Abbeylara). The trackway did not evolve into the modern road once the local landlord constructed a metalled road with bridge to the east, bypassing Rathgarve church and settlement in the 18th century.
