= Killucan (civil parish) =

Civil parish in County Westmeath, Ireland

Killucan Cill Liúcainne
- Civil parish
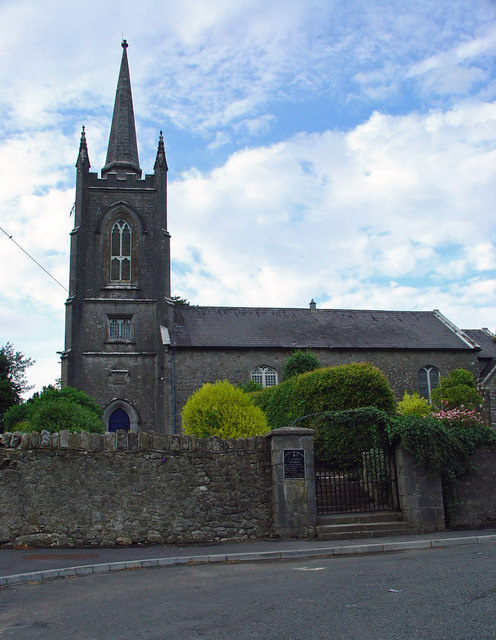
- St. Etchen's Church, Killucan

- Location of Killucan within County Westmeath in Ireland
- Coordinates: 53°30′10″N 7°8′27″W
- Country: Ireland
- Province: Leinster
- County: County Westmeath
- Irish grid reference: N570506

Killucan (Irish: Cill Liúcainne) is a civil parish in County Westmeath, Ireland. It is located about 14 kilometres (9 mi) east of Mullingar.

Killucan is the sole civil parish in the barony of Farbill in the province of Leinster. The civil parish covers 35,625.3 acres (144.170 km^{2}).

The neighbouring civil parishes are:

- Killagh, Killulagh and Rathconnell to the north
- Killaconnigan and Killyon (both in County Meath) to the east
- Clonard (in County Meath) to the south
- Enniscoffey, Lynn, Mullingar and Pass of Kilbride to the west

== Townlands ==
Killucan civil parish comprises 77 townlands:

- Aghamore
- Annaskinnan
- Balleighter Lowtown
- Ballinla
- Balloughter Hightown
- Ballyhaw
- Balrowan (Pakenham)
- Balrowan (Rowely) & Kerinstown
- Banagher
- Brutonstown
- Brutonstown Little
- Castledown
- Chanonstown
- Cloghanstown
- Clonbore
- Cloncrave
- Cloncullen
- Clonfad
- Clonreagh
- Coolcahan
- Corbally
- Corbetstown
- Correllstown
- Craddanstown
- Creggstown
- Crossanstown
- Curristown
- Cushinstown
- Derryboy
- Derrymore
- Edmondstown
- Glebe
- Grange Beg
- Grange More
- Greatdown
- Greenan
- Grehanstown
- Griffinstown
- Heathstown
- Higginstown
- Hightown Balloughter
- Hodgestown
- Huntingdon
- Hydepark
- Joristown Lower
- Joristown Upper
- Kerinstown & Balrowan (Rowley)
- Killucan
- Kinnegad
- Knockaville
- Knockmant
- Knocksimon
- Lisnabin
- Lowtown Balleighter
- Lunestown
- Mill Land
- Millerstown
- Monganstown
- Mucklin
- Mylestown
- Newdown
- Porterstown (Cooke)
- Porterstown (Napper)
- Priesttown
- Raharney
- Raharney Little
- Rathbrack
- Rathnarrow
- Rathwire Lower
- Rathwire Upper
- Ratrass
- Rattin
- Riverdale
- Riverstown
- Sarsfieldstown
- Simonstown
- Sionhill
- Thomastown
- Wadestown
- Wardenstown and Wooddown. Greenan and Mucklin townlands are in the barony of Delvin
