= Randoon =

Viking fort in County Westmeath, Ireland

Coordinates: 53.657°N 7.252°W

Randoon (Randún)
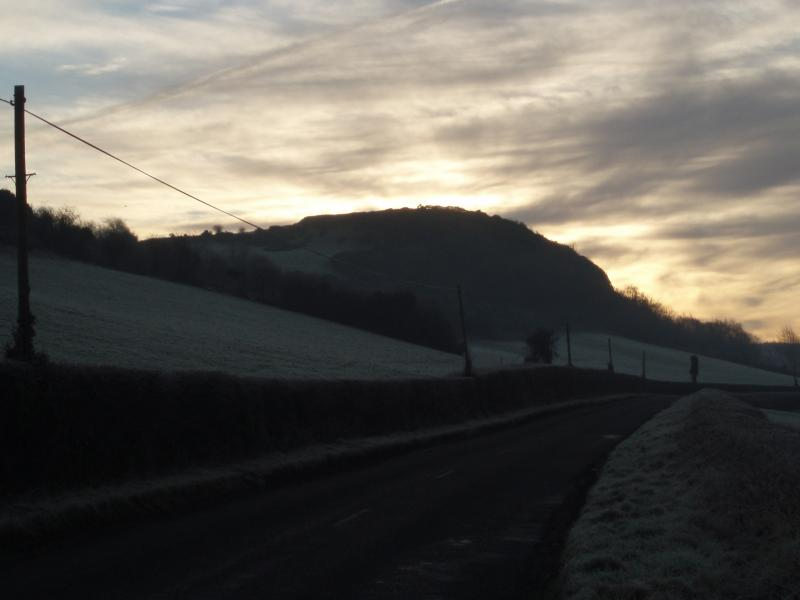
- Randoon (Randún) overgrown ringfort, Ranaghan, County Westmeath in morning sky

Highest point
- Elevation: 125 m (410 ft)

Geography
- Location: County Westmeath, Ireland

Randoon (Randún) is a Turgesius Viking fortress located southwest of Lough Lene in Ireland. The fortress is situated upon a hill in Ranaghan, dominating by its height all other ringforts in the area, and overlooking Lough Lene between the towns of Castlepollard and Collinstown. The locally used term fort refers to any of the multitude of ringforts, many of which have been overgrown by vegetation. These remain today as historical relics Early Medieval Period of Ireland and Western Europe; they protected by Irish national heritage law.

== Habitat ==
The area supports deciduous woodland mostly of native species such as hazel (Corylus avellana), rowan (Sorbus aucuparia), ash (Fraxinus excelsior) and sessile oak (Quercus petraea). Exotic species occur occasionally, including beech (Fagus sylvatica).

The neighbouring Loughpark, Windtown woods are inhabited by wild pheasant and are a popular attraction for the local pheasant hunters.

On occasions the pochard population, which is one of the largest in Ireland, has exceeded the threshold for international importance (i.e. 3500 individual fowl).

To the west and north, the neighbouring woods are inhabited by pheasants and are a popular attraction for local hunters.

== See also ==
- Ringforts
- Hill of Tara
- Viking
