= Monganstown =

Townland in County Westmeath, Ireland

Monganstown is a townland in County Westmeath, Ireland. The townland is in the civil parish of Killucan. The R446 road runs through the middle, with the Kinnegad River forming the border to the south. The town of Kinnegad is directly to the east of the townland.
