= Kilpatrick, County Westmeath (civil parish) =

Civil parish in County Westmeath, Ireland

Kilpatrick Cill Phádraig
- Civil parish
- Location of Kilpatrick within County Westmeath in Ireland
- Coordinates: 53°37′3″N 7°13′45″W
- Country: Ireland
- Province: Leinster
- County: County Westmeath
- Irish grid reference: N510633

Kilpatrick (Irish: Cill Phádraig), is a civil parish in County Westmeath, Ireland. It is located about 13 km (8 mi) north–east of Mullingar.

Kilpatrick is one of 8 civil parishes in the barony of Fore in the province of Leinster. The civil parish covers 1,898 acres (7.68 km^{2}).

Kilpatrick civil parish comprises 3 townlands: Clondalever, Kilpatrick and Tuitestown.

The neighbouring civil parishes are: St. Feighin's to the north, Killulagh to the east, Rathconnell and Taghmon to the south and Faughalstown to the west and north.
