= Mayne, County Westmeath (civil parish) =

Civil parish in County Westmeath, Ireland

Mayne Maighean
- Civil parish
- Location of Mayne within County Westmeath in Ireland
- Coordinates: 53°41′11″N 7°22′12″W
- Country: Ireland
- Province: Leinster
- County: County Westmeath
- Irish grid reference: N416709

Mayne (Irish: Maighean), is a civil parish in County Westmeath, Ireland. It is located about 18 km (11 mi) north of Mullingar.

Mayne is one of eight civil parishes in the barony of Fore in the province of Leinster. The civil parish covers 7,197 acres (2,913 ha).

Mayne civil parish comprises the village of Coole and 19 townlands: Ballinealoe, Carn, Clonteens, Coole (townland), Coolure Demesne, Derrya, Fearmore, Lickny, Lispopple, Mayne, Monktown, Newtown, Nonsuch, Packenhamhall or Tullynally, Portjack, Shrubbywood, Simonstown, Tullynally or Pakenhamhall, Turbotstown, Williamstown.

The neighbouring civil parishes are: Lickbla to the north, Rathgarve to the east, Faughalstown to the south and Street to the west.
