= Delvin (civil parish) =

Civil parish in County Westmeath, Ireland

Delvin Dealbhna
- Civil parish
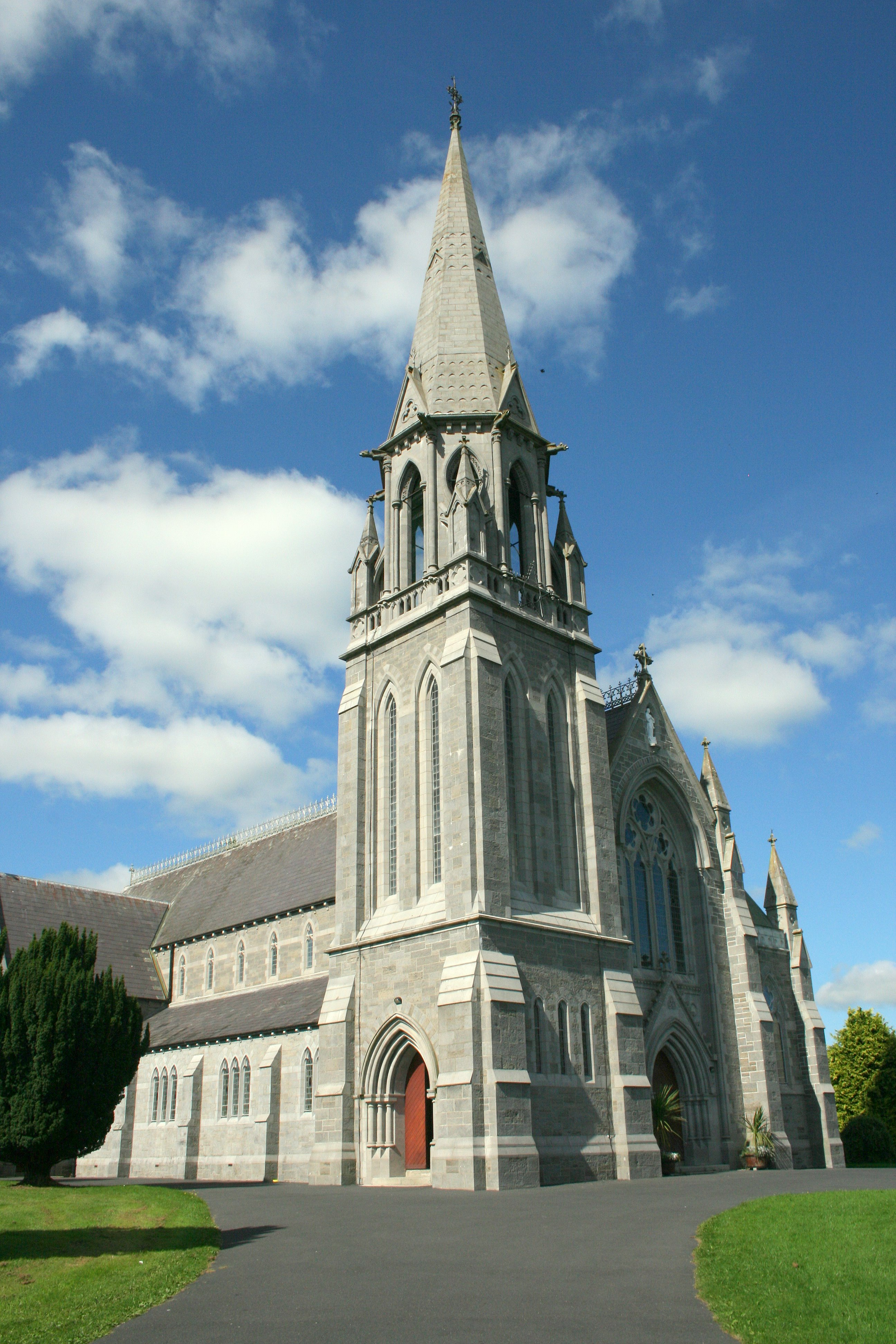
- Church of the Assumption, Delvin

- Location of Delvin in County Westmeath, Ireland
- Coordinates: 53°37′3″N 7°4′18″W
- Country: Ireland
- Province: Leinster
- County: County Westmeath
- Irish grid reference: N614634

Delvin (Irish: Dealbhna), also known as Castletowndelvin or Castletown Delvin, is a civil parish in County Westmeath, Ireland. It is located about 21 km (13 mi) north-east of Mullingar.

Delvin is one of seven civil parishes in the barony of Delvin in the province of Leinster. The civil parish covers 18,279 acres (73.97 km^{2}). The largest population centre is the town of Delvin.

Delvin civil parish comprises 46 townlands: Addinstown, Archerstown, Ballinlig, Ballinlough (Wadding), Ballinn, Ballinure aka Ballyhealy, Ballinvally, Ballyhealy aka Ballinure, Ballynaskeagh, Balrath North, Balrath South, Billstown, Bolandstown, Brownstown, Caddagh, Carnybrogan, Castletowndelvin aka Delvin, Cavestown and Rosmead, Clonleame, Clonmaskill, Clonmorrill, Clonnagapple, Clonyn, Cockstown, Crowinstown Great, Crowinstown Little, Delvin aka Castletowndelvin, Dunganstown, Earlsmeadow aka Lisclogher Little, Ellenstown, Grangestown, Kilgar, Killadoughran, Lisclogher Great, Lisclogher Little aka Earlsmeadow, Loughanstown, Mabestown, Martinstown, Mitchelstown, Mooretown, Moyleroe Big, Moyleroe Little, Mullaghcroy, Newtown, Printinstown, Robinstown Great, Robinstown Little, Rosmead and Cavestown, Southhill and Stonestown.

The neighbouring civil parishes are: Clonarney, Killallon (County Meath) and Killua to the north, Athboy and Kildalkey (County Meath) to the east, Killulagh to the south, and Kilcumny and St. Marys to the west.
