= Killynan (Cooke) =

Townland in County Westmeath, Ireland

Killynan (Cooke) Cill Fhíonáin (Cooke)
- Townland
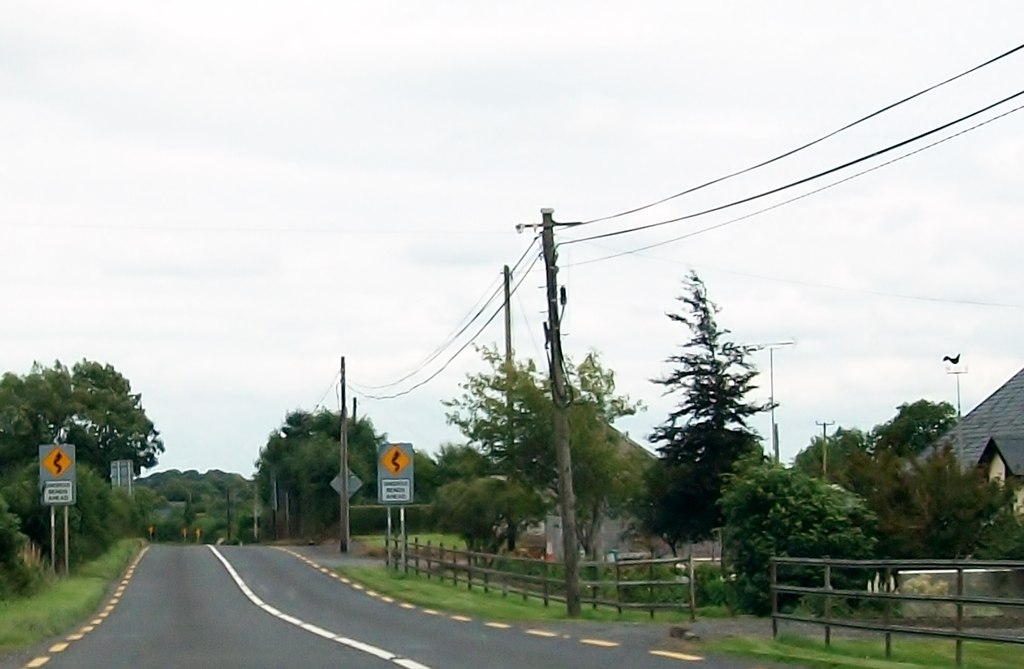
- N52 road passing through Killynan (Cooke)

- Location of Killynan (Cooke) within County Westmeath in the Republic of Ireland
- Coordinates: 53°33′41″N 7°13′46″W
- Country: Ireland
- Province: Leinster
- County: County Westmeath
- Irish grid reference: N511570

Killynan (Cooke) (Irish: Cill Fhíonáin (Cooke)) is a townland in County Westmeath, Ireland, 9 kilometres (6 mi) east of Mullingar.

Killynan (Cooke) is one of 34 townlands of the civil parish of Rathconnell in the barony of Moyashel and Magheradernon in the Province of Leinster. The townland covers 1,094.63 acres (4.4298 km^{2}).

The neighbouring townlands are: Balreagh to the north, Killynan (Pratt) to the east, Aghadaugh to the south–east, Clonickilvant to the south, Cooksborough and Cloghanumera to the south–west, Mountrobert and Loughagar More to the west and Clonkill to the north–west. The N52 road passes through the townland roughly in an east–west direction.

In the 1911 census of Ireland there were 13 houses and 44 inhabitants in the townland.
