= Faughalstown =

Civil parish in County Westmeath, Ireland

Faughalstown Fochla
- Civil parish
- Location of Faughalstown in County Westmeath, Ireland
- Coordinates: 53°38′20″N 7°17′58″W
- Country: Ireland
- Province: Leinster
- County: County Westmeath
- Irish grid reference: N463656

Faughalstown (Irish: Fochla), is a civil parish in County Westmeath, Ireland. It is located about 13 km (8 mi) north of Mullingar.

Faughalstown is one of 8 civil parishes in the barony of Fore in the province of Leinster. The civil parish covers 7,001.1 acres (28.332 km^{2}).

Faughalstown civil parish comprises 20 townlands: Ballybeg, Derrynagarragh, Faughalstown, Froghanstown, Gartlandstown, Grangestown, Kiltoom, Milltown, Ranahinch, Ringstown, Streamstown and Templanstown.

The neighbouring civil parishes are: Mayne and Rathgarve to the north, Kilpatrick and St. Feighin's to the east and Taghmon to the south.
