= Killua (civil parish) =

Civil parish in County Westmeath, Ireland

Killua Chill Dalua
- Civil parish
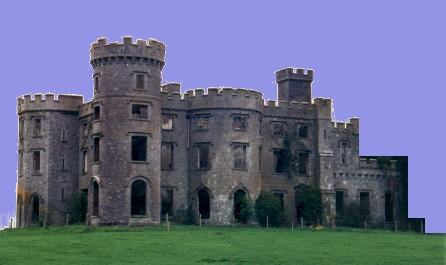
- Killua Castle

- Location of Killua within County Westmeath in Ireland
- Coordinates: 53°38′53″N 6°59′50″W
- Country: Ireland
- Province: Leinster
- County: County Westmeath
- Irish grid reference: N663669

Killua (Irish: Chill Dalua) is a civil parish in County Westmeath, Ireland. It is located about 27 kilometres (17 mi) north–east of Mullingar.

Killua is one of 7 civil parishes in the barony of Delvin in the Province of Leinster. The civil parish covers 5,262.2 acres (21.295 km^{2}). The largest population centre is the small town of Clonmellon.

Killua civil parish comprises 12 townlands: Ballinlough, Clonmellon, Cloran & Corcullentry, Corcullentry aka Cloran & Corcullentry, Dervotstown, Heathstown, Killua, Kilrush Lower, Kilrush Upper, Knock Killua, Moygrehan Lower, Moygrehan Upper and Paristown.

The neighbouring civil parishes are: Killallon and Kilskeer (both County Meath) to the north, Girley (County Meath) to the east and Delvin to the south and west.
