= St. Mary's, Fore =

Civil parish in County Westmeath, Ireland

St. Mary's
- Civil parish
- Location of St. Mary's within County Westmeath, Ireland
- Coordinates: 53°40′23″N 7°10′36″W
- Country: Ireland
- Province: Leinster
- County: County Westmeath
- Irish grid reference: N544695

St. Mary's is a civil parish in County Westmeath, Ireland. It is located about 20 km (12 mi) north–north–east of Mullingar.

St. Mary's is one of 8 civil parishes in the barony of Fore in the province of Leinster. The civil parish covers 4,290.6 acres (17.363 km^{2}).

St. Mary's civil parish comprises 7 townlands: Aghalasty and Ankersland, Balnavine, Carrick, Christianstown, Cummerstown, Glenidan and Martinstown.

The neighbouring civil parishes are: Moylagh (County Meath) to the north, Delvin to the east, Clonarney to the east and south, Kilcumny to the south and St. Feighin's to the west.
