= Killua (singer) =

Albanian singer and songwriter

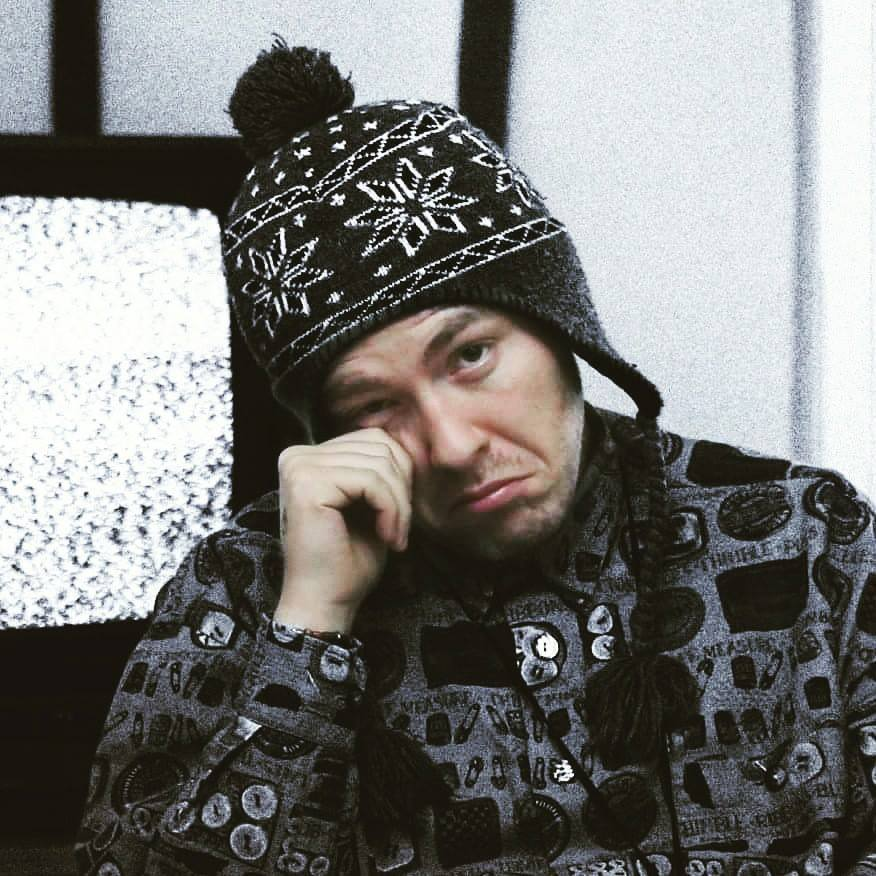
- Demaj in 2018
- Born: Aris Demaj
- Other names: Sir-A
- Occupations: Singer; songwriter
- Years active: 2017–present
- Musical career
- Genres: Hip hop
- Instruments: Vocal

Aris Demaj (Albanian: [aˈɾis dɛˈmaj]), known professionally as Killua, is an Albanian singer and songwriter.

== Life and career ==
=== Early life and career beginnings ===
Killua was born as Aris Demaj. He was born into an ethnic Albanian family. Demaj caught national attention in the Albanian-speaking Balkans in late 2021, upon the release of "Bageti e Bujqësi" as the lead single from his upcoming debut album, Metamorfoza. The single's title is derived from the poem of the same title written by Albanian poet Naim Frashëri in the 19th century. It peaked at number 2 on the Albanian Top 100 in early November 2021 and rose to number one a week later. Prior to its solo success, Demaj was featured on Albanian disc jockey Arnon's successful "Te molla" in August 2018. The Albanian-language song became a top 15 single in Albania and reached number 13 in the Commonwealth of Independent States.

== Discography ==
=== Albums ===
- Metamorfoza (TBA)

=== Singles ===
==== As lead artist ====
Title	Year	Peak chart positions	Album
Title	Year	ALB	Album
"Ndjenja blu"	2017	—	Non-album single
"Llastic"	2018	—	Non-album single
"Jeni plak"	2018	—	Non-album single
"Kush je ti"	2018	—	Non-album single
"Kanget e pakendueme"	2021	—	Non-album single
"Bageti e Bujqësi"	2021	1	Metamorfoza
"—" denotes a recording that did not chart or was not released in that territory.

==== As featured artist ====
Title	Year	Peak chart positions		Album
Title	Year	ALB	CIS	Album
"Hajde dalim" (Sheila Haxhiraj featuring Killua)	2018	—	—	Non-album single
"Te molla" (Arnon featuring Killua)	2018	15	13	Non-album single
"Dhuratë prej saj" (Elgit Doda featuring Killua)	2019	—	—	Non-album single
"—" denotes a recording that did not chart or was not released in that territory.
