= Lickbla =

- Civil parish
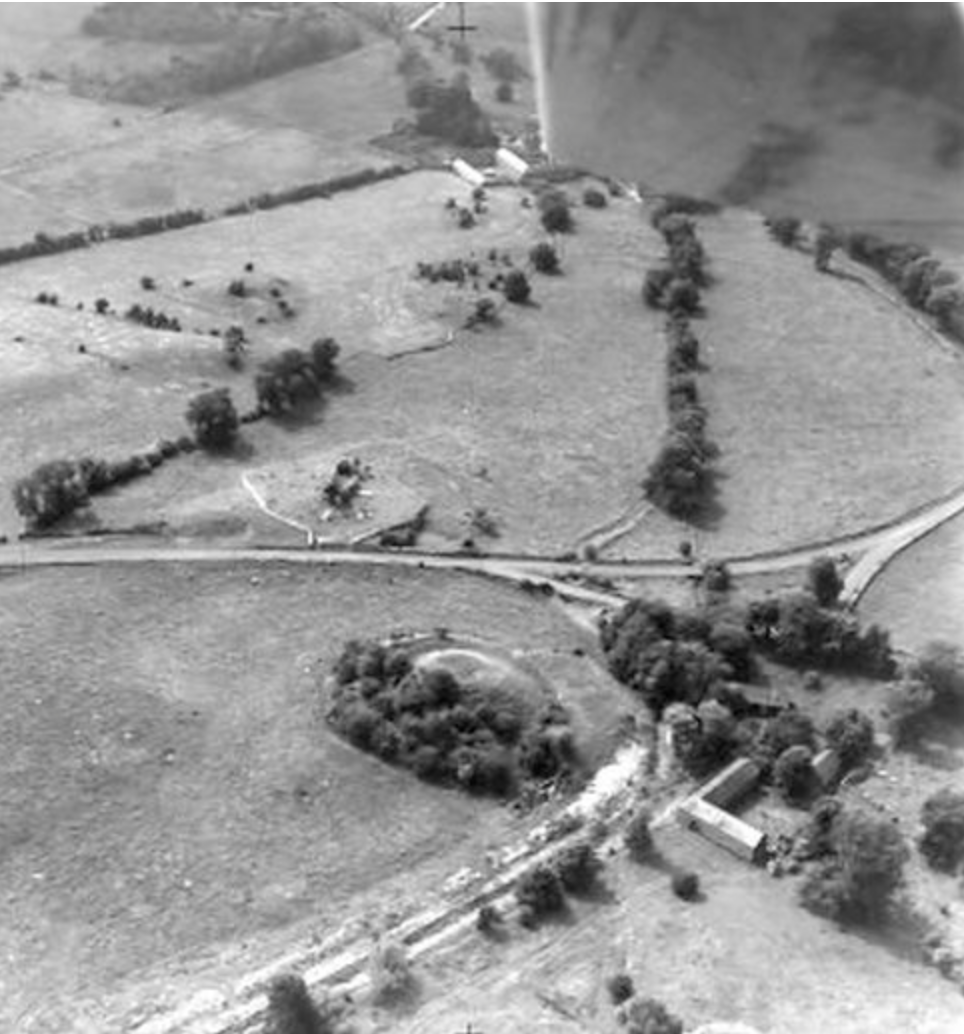
- Lickbla from the north east in August 1965

- Location of Lickbla in County Westmeath, Ireland
- Coordinates: 53°43′56″N 7°20′36″W
- Country: Ireland
- Province: Leinster
- County: County Westmeath
- Irish grid reference: N433760

Lickbla (pronounced Lick-blay, in Irish: Leicc Bladma meaning "Bladma's Leacht or Hearth"), is a historic monument, civil parish, religious parish, and townland, in County Westmeath, Ireland. It is located about 23.05 kilometres (14 mi) north of Mullingar. St. Bladma is listed in the Martyrology of Oengus (died 11 March 824) as a saint: "Bladma, i.e. from Blad son of Conmac Cas Clothach, grandson of Tachall son of Cermait, son of the Dagda, a quo nominatur. Or Blad son of Breogan, a quo Sliab Bladma" whose feastday is 7 April and 20 November.

The civil parish of Lickbla is one of 8 civil parishes in the barony of Fore in the Province of Leinster. The civil parish covers 8,819.5 acres (35.691 km^{2}). Lickbla civil parish comprises 24 townlands: Ardnagross, Ballynagall, Ballynagall Little, Ballynameagh, Balrath, Bigwood, Camagh, Carlanstown, Castletown Lower, Castletown Upper, Clonrobert, Clonsura, Curry, Derrycrave, Doon, Gilbertstown, Lickbla, Littlewood, Martinstown, Mullagh, Newcastle, Rathcreevagh, Robinstown and Rochestown. The neighbouring civil parishes are: Foyran to the north, Rathgarve to the east and south, Mayne to the south, Street to the south and west and Abbeylara (County Longford) to the west.

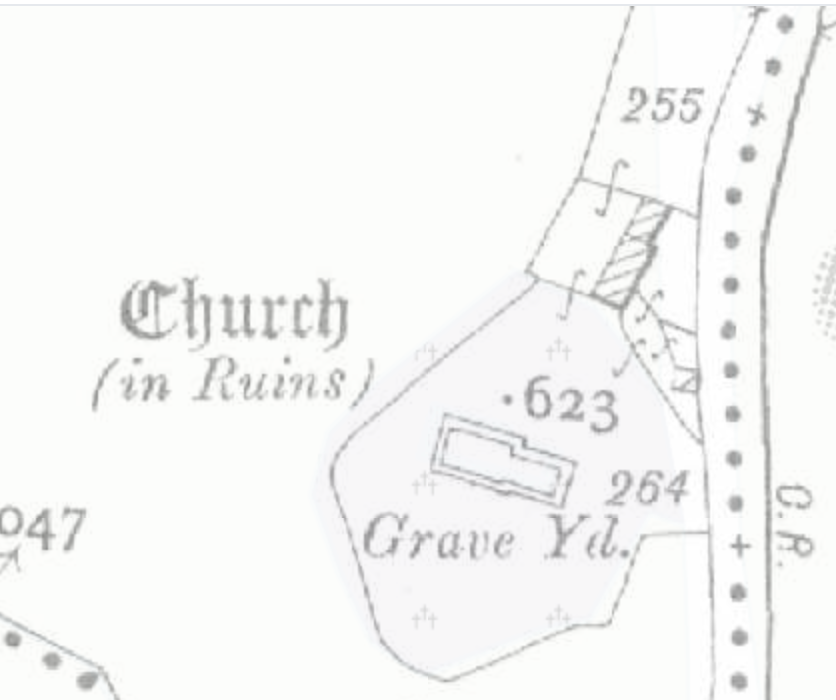
Lickbla graveyard and church from the Ordnance Survey circa 1900

The religious parish was subsumed into Castlepollard Parish (St. Michael), and existed as a 'vicarage' and is listed as having tithe evaluation in 1837 of "£276 18s. 5 ½d. of which £123 1s. 6d. is payable to the impropriator, and the remainder to the vicar (of Castlepollard)"

The present historic monument consists of a ruined medieval 'barn' church aligned towards east south east (rather than due east) surrounded by an ovoid graveyard possibly set within a larger earlier enclosure. The medieval church, most likely constructed in the 13th century as part of the newly formed manor of Lickbla, dedicated the Blessed Virgin Mary, was in use until the early modern era. It is set on a small hill at the crossing of the River Glore within a river flood plain, also bisected by a mill-race, and may have consisted of a rocky outcrop making it a significant landmark prior to the monument's construction. If such a rocky outcrop exists under the ruins and graveyard, this would have given rise to the name "Leicc" or stone/hearth.

The "present remains consist of a nave and chancel church with post medieval entrance gate inserted into E end of S wall of chancel when chancel was converted into private burial area by the Nugent family. The walls of the church are built with coursed rubble with base batter visible on the east gable of church which survives to full height and contains a single light round-headed window with hollowed recessed spandrels and square hood-moulding above. The punch dressed jambs with glazing grooves of the medieval window do not match the round headed arch of the window which was possibly inserted into the window in the late 16th/ early 17th century. The interior of the chancel which is smaller in width than the nave was converted into a private burial area in the 19th century if not earlier. Inside the chancel in front of the E window there is the headstone of Reverend John Murray, priest of Castlepollard who died in 1805. Only the springing stones of the chancel arch survives on the S side. A low stone wall running across this opening was built in the post-medieval period blocking access from the nave into the chancel. Possible remains of a broken out window in NE corner of chancel. According to Cogan (1867, 400) the parish of Lickbla was dedicated to the Blessed Virgin and formed part of the monastic estate of Fore abbey (WM004-035010-). Cogan described the church ruins of Lickbla as following; ‘the old church measured fifty-five feet seven inches (16.75m) by eighteen feet six-inches (5.6m)’ (ibid.)"

As with Foyran and Rathgarve, the current extant remains are of an early medieval church set within a possible earlier early Christian enclosure, adjoined by a motte & bailey. Lickbla, in addition is located near the ruins of a medieval mill/castle complex which would have included a bridge over the River Glore (running from Lough Glore to the River Inney) as evidenced by Ordnance Survey maps of circa 1900.

Currently, the graveyard is heavily overgrown and the church is poorly preserved. The present owner is Westmeath County Council following divestment from the Church of Ireland, following disestablishment, in 1870.

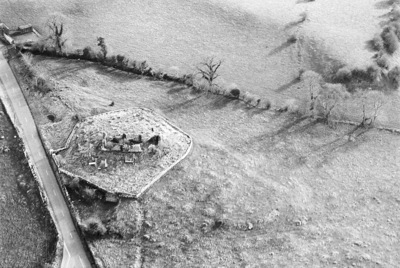
Oblique aerial photograph of Lickbla, County Westmeath

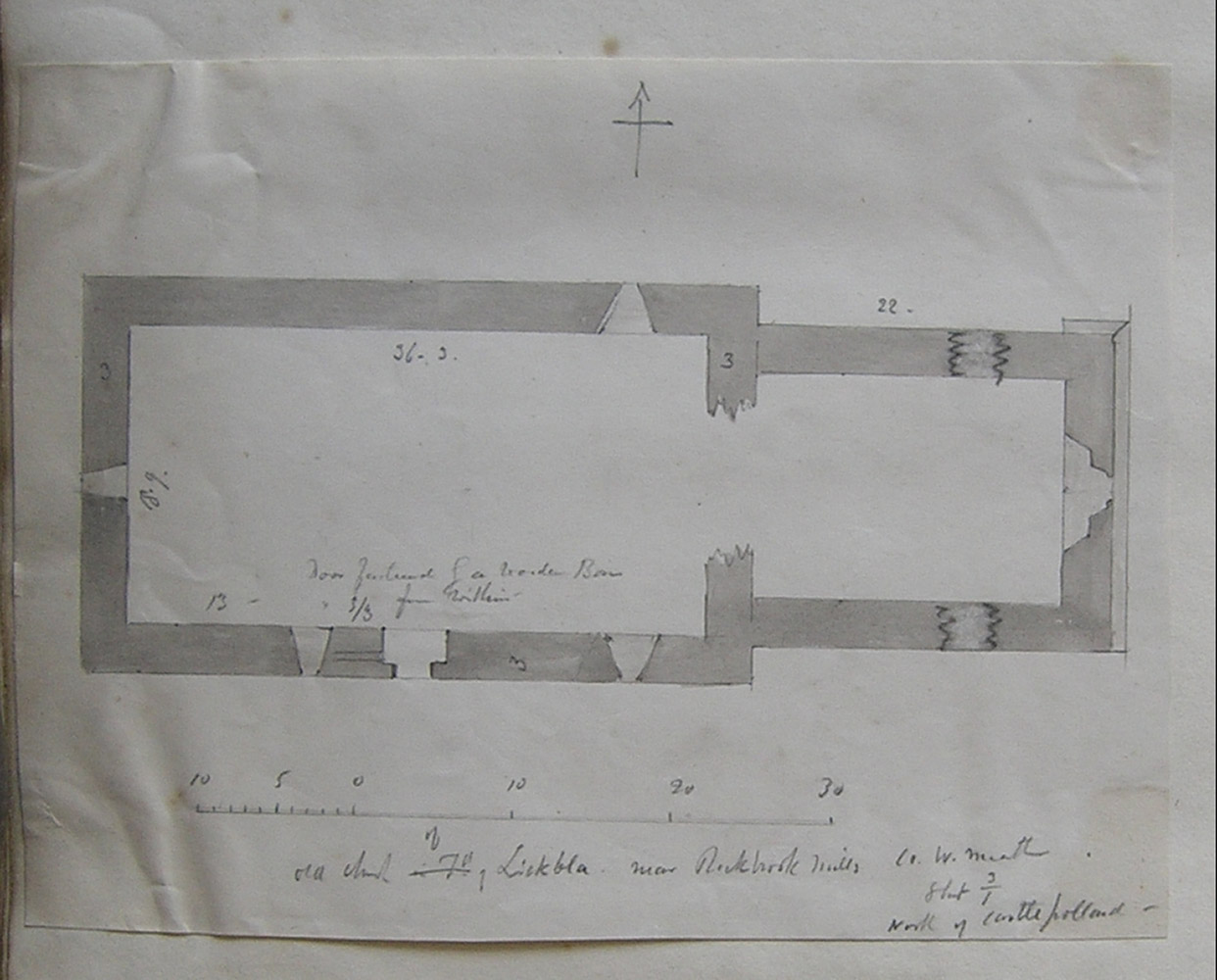
Du Noyer's drawing of St. Mary's Church. Lickbla
