= Martinstown, Delvin =

Townland in County Westmeath, Ireland

Martinstown is a townland in County Westmeath, Ireland. The townland is located in the civil parish of Delvin. The townland lies directly south of the town of Delvin, close to the N52 road.

A ruined castle is situated in the south of the townland.
