= Delvin (barony) =

Barony in County Westmeath, Ireland

Delvin Dealbhna
- Barony
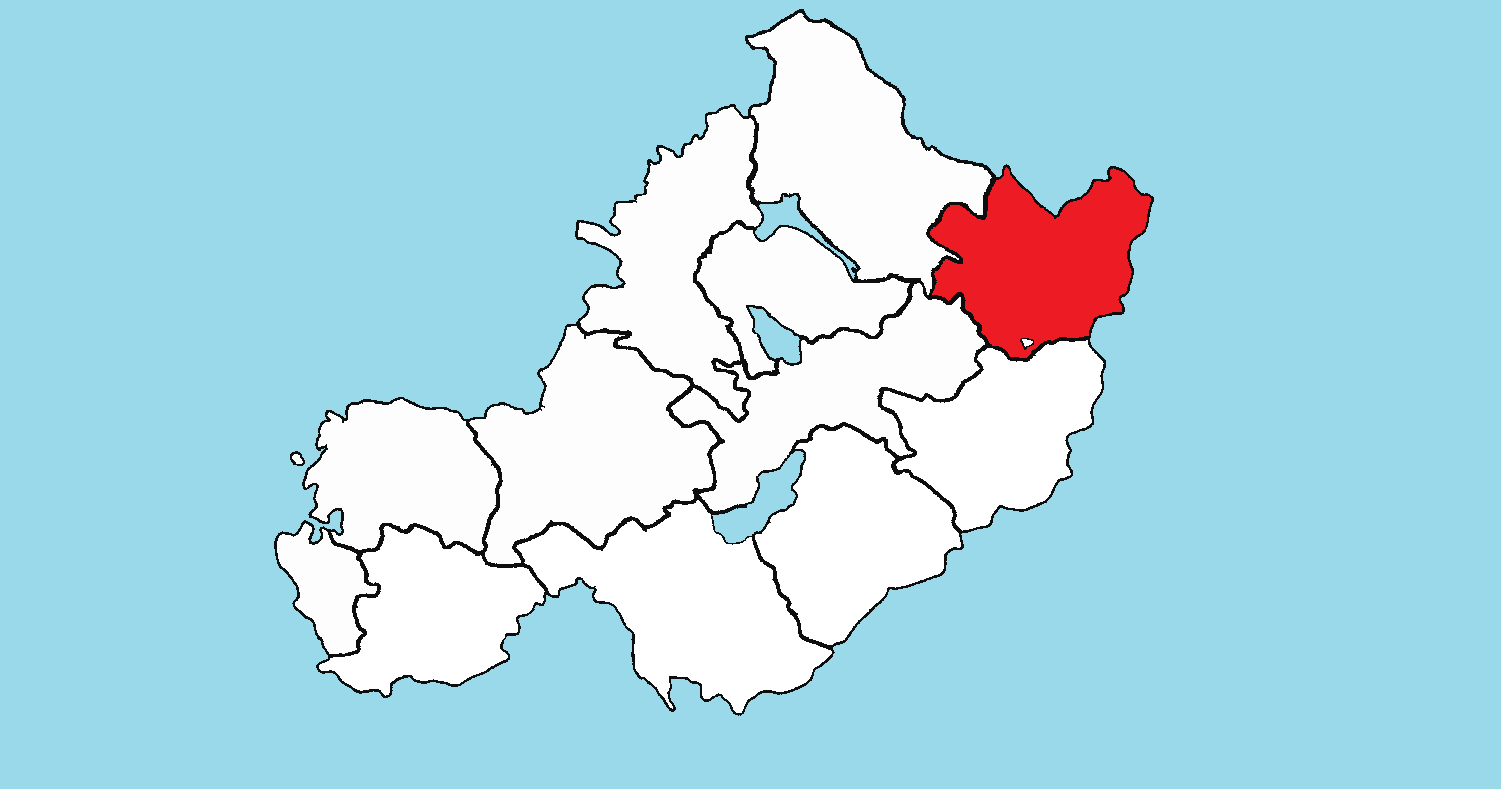
- Location of Delvin on a map of Westmeath

- Location in Ireland
- Coordinates: 53°36′56″N 7°05′04″W
- Country: Ireland
- Province: Leinster
- County: Westmeath

Area
  - Total: 155.8 km^{2} (60.2 sq mi)
- Time zone: UTC+0 (WET)
  - Summer (DST): UTC+1 (IST (WEST))
- Irish Grid Reference: N606632

Delvin (Irish: Dealbhna) is a barony in north-east County Westmeath, in Ireland. It was formed by 1672. It is bordered by County Meath to the east and three other baronies: Fore (to the north–west), Moyashel and Magheradernon (to the south–west) and Farbill (to the south). The largest centre of population is Delvin.

== Geography ==
Delvin barony has an area of 38,507.5 acres (155.834 km^{2}). The N51, a national secondary road, starts in Delvin at a junction with the N52 and leaves the barony eventually terminating near Drogheda in County Louth. The N52 passes through Delvin, connecting the M1 motorway north of Dundalk in County Louth with the M7 motorway just south of Nenagh, County Tipperary. The R395 regional road links Delvin to Edgeworthstown in County Longford.

== Civil parishes of the barony ==
This table lists an historical geographical sub-division of the barony known as the civil parish (not to be confused with an Ecclesiastical parish).

Name in English	Name in Irish
Clonarney	Cluain Earna
Delvin	Dealbhna
Kilcumny	Cill Chuimne
Killagh	–
Killua	Cill Dalua
Killucan (part of)	Cill Liúcainne
Killulagh	Cill Uailleach

The civil parish of Killucan is split between two baronies, however the majority is within the barony of Farbill.

== Towns, villages and townlands ==
- Archerstown
- Bracklin
- Clonmellon
- Delvin
- Drumcree

There are 98 townlands in the barony of Delvin.

== Buildings of note ==
- Ballinlough Castle
- Clonyn Castle
- Delvin Castle
- Killua Castle
