= Farbill =

Barony in County Westmeath, Ireland

Farbill Fir Bhile
- Barony
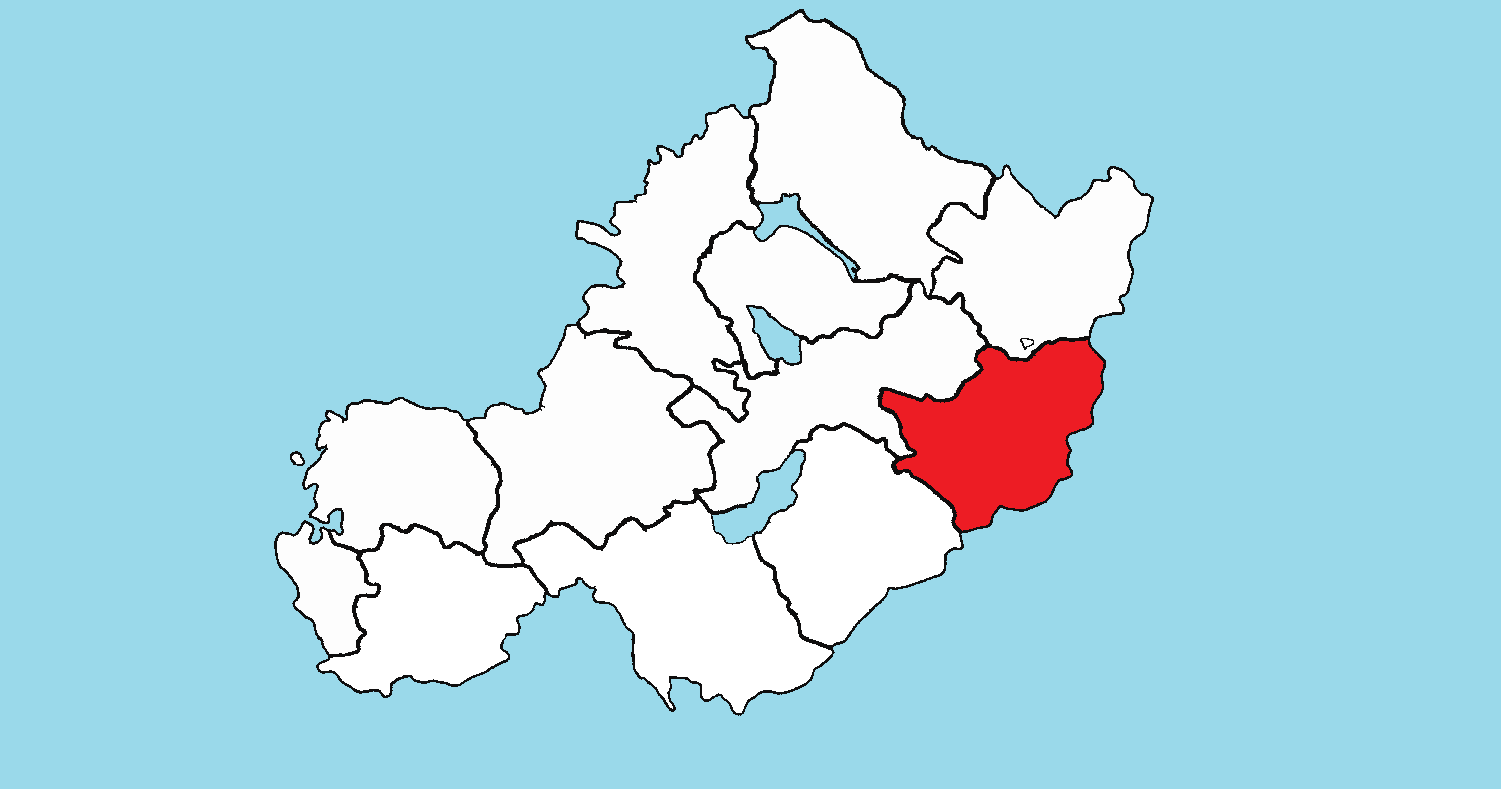
- Location of Farbill on a map of Westmeath

- Location in Ireland
- Coordinates: 53°30′09″N 7°08′27″W
- Country: Ireland
- Province: Leinster
- County: Westmeath

Area
  - Total: 143.6 km^{2} (55.4 sq mi)
- Time zone: UTC+0 (WET)
  - Summer (DST): UTC+1 (IST (WEST))
- Irish Grid Reference: N570505

Farbill (Irish: Fir Bhile) is a barony in east County Westmeath, in Ireland. It was formed by 1672. It is bordered by County Meath to the south and east and three other baronies: Fartullagh (to the south–west), Moyashel and Magheradernon (to the north–east) and Delvin (to the north). The largest centre of population in the barony is the town of Kinnegad.

== Geography ==
Farbill has an area of 35,488.8 acres (143.618 km^{2}). The M4 motorway passes to the south of Kinnegad connecting Dublin with Sligo and the M6 motorway from Galway joins the M4 at Kinnegad. Several regional roads radiate from Kinnegad. Those passing through Farbill are the R148 to Dublin and the R161 to Navan. To the north the R156 passes through Killucan linking the N3 near Clonee in County Meath to the N4 (near Mullingar).

A railway line carrying the national rail company Iarnród Éireann's Dublin to Longford commuter service and Dublin to Sligo intercity service. also passes through the barony. The Royal Canal follows a similar route through Farbill connecting the River Liffey in Dublin to Longford town.

== Civil parishes of the barony ==
This table lists an historical geographical sub-division of the barony known as the civil parish (not to be confused with an Ecclesiastical parish).

Name in English	Name in Irish
Killucan	Cill Liúcainne

The barony of Farbill consists of just one civil parish, Killucan, however two townlands of Killucan, Greenan, and Mucklin, are in the barony of Delvin.

== Towns, villages and townlands ==
There are 76 townlands in the barony of Farbill. Villages include:

- Coralstown
- The Downs, about 5 miles east of Mullingar
- Killucan
- Kinnegad
- Raharney
- Rathwire
