= Mullaghmeen =

Highest mountain in County Westmeath, Ireland

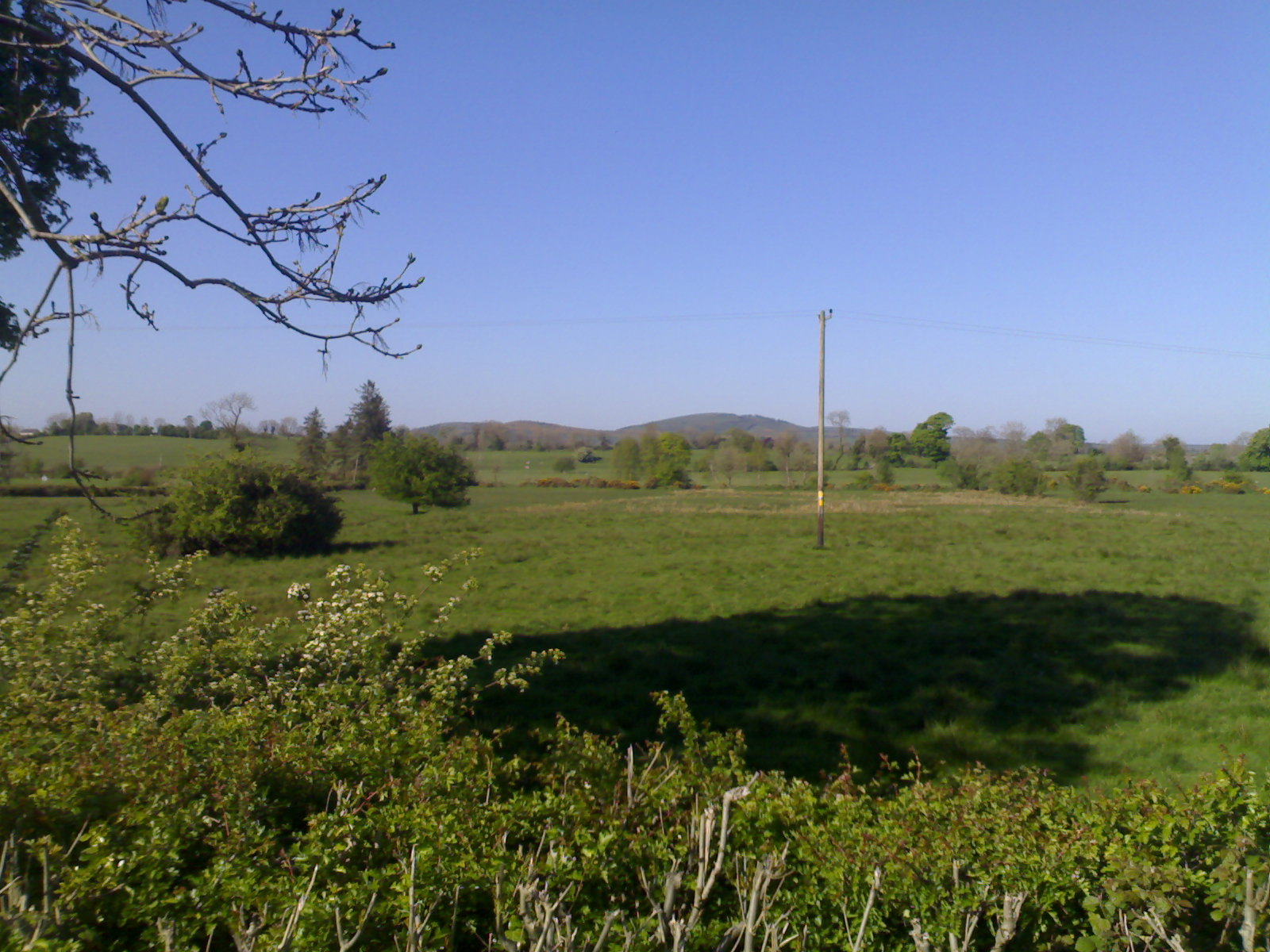
- Mullaghmeen Hill viewed from Coole

Highest point
- Elevation: 258 m (846 ft)
- Prominence: 146 m (479 ft)
- Listing: County top (Westmeath)
- Coordinates: 53°45′43″N 7°17′21″W

Naming
- Native name: Mullach Mín
- English translation: smooth summit

Geography
- Location within island of Ireland
- Location: County Westmeath, Ireland
- Parent range: Westmeath Hills
- OSI/OSNI grid: N469793
- Topo map: OSi Discovery 41

Geology
- Mountain type(s): Undifferentiated limestone, (Visean Limestones (undifferentiated))

Mullaghmeen (Irish: Mullach Mín, meaning 'smooth summit'), at 258 metres (846 ft), is the county top for Westmeath in Ireland, and is the lowest county top in Ireland. Mullaghmeen is located in the Mullaghmeen Forest, known for having the largest planted beech forest in Europe.

== Geography ==
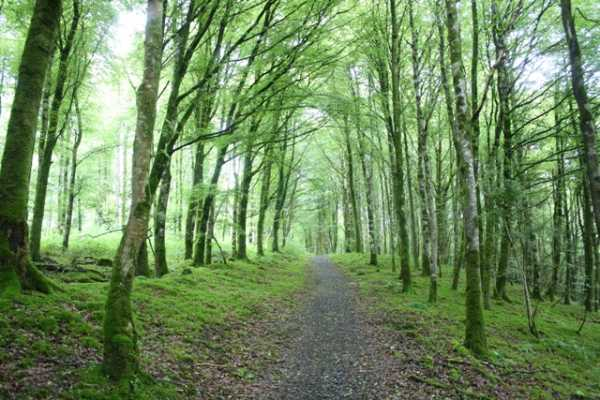
Mullaghmeen Forest

Mullaghmeen lies in the northern tip of County Westmeath, just inside the border with County Meath, and looks into the northern Lough Sheelin, which forms the border with County Cavan. The hill is 16 km north of the town of Castlepollard. At 258 metres (846 ft), the summit of Mullaghmeen is the highest point in County Westmeath, however, it is the lowest county top in Ireland. The soil of Mullaghmeen is limestone, and in 1936 the Department of Agriculture decided it would be suited to the planting of deciduous trees, and created the 400 ha Mullaghmeen Forest, the largest planted beech forest in Europe.

== Hill walking ==
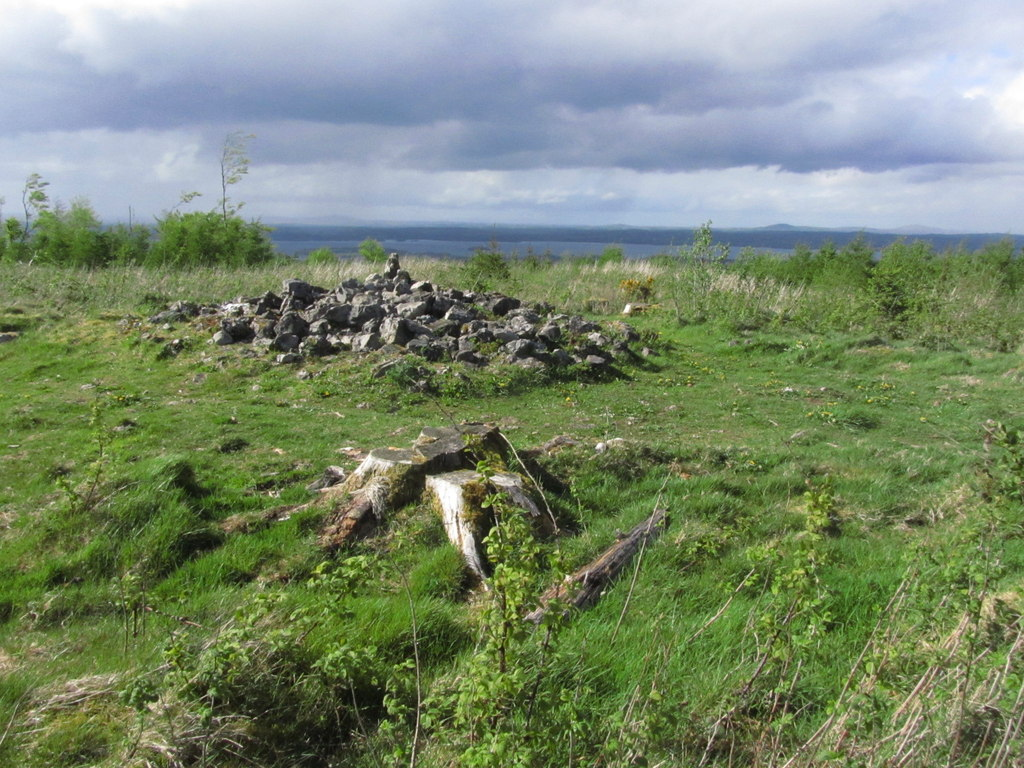
Mullaghmeen summit cairn

Mullaghmeen is described as a difficult mountain to find, and while its summit is of modest height, it is well-regarded as part of one of the several 2–3 hour circa 6 mile forest loop-walks through the Mullaghmeen Forest. Most start at the car-park just beyond the entrance to Mullaghmeen Forest (at N479779) and take in the summit of Mullaghmeen as well as other landmarks, such as the Booley Hut, the Famine Garden, the Flax Pits, and the Woodland Arboretum.

== See also ==
- Lists of mountains in Ireland
- List of Irish counties by highest point
- List of mountains of the British Isles by height
