= Ranaghan =

Townland in County Westmeath, Ireland

Ranaghan Ranaghan
- Town
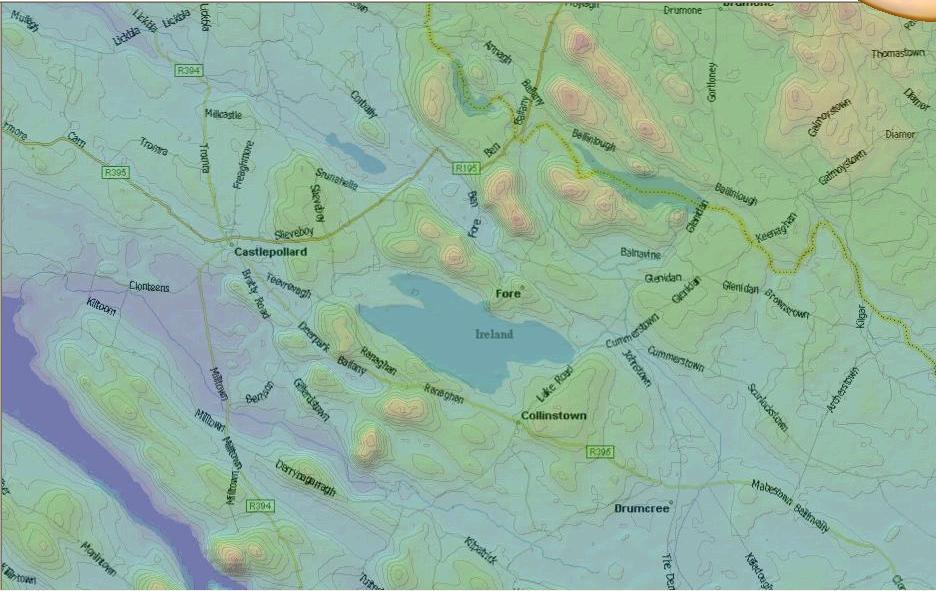
- Hills of Ranaghan

- Location in Ireland
- Coordinates: 53°38′50″N 7°13′48″W
- Country: Ireland
- Province: Leinster
- County: County Westmeath
- Elevation: 128 m (420 ft)
- merged with Castlepollard
- Time zone: UTC+0 (WET)
  - Summer (DST): UTC-1 (IST (WEST))
- Irish Grid Reference: N463640

Ranaghan is a townland and archaeological site in County Westmeath, Ireland.

== Introduction ==
It is south-west of Lough Lene on high ground where there are a multitude of ringforts. Randoon (Randún), possibly the most famous fort of the area, is between Castlepollard and Collinstown. Turgesius the Viking is believed to have governed and sojourned in this area.

== Origins ==
Ringforts are fortified settlements, generally agreed to be from the Early Medieval Period in Northern Europe, especially Ireland. They are also known as ráth (as in Ranaghan) caiseal, cathair and dún (as in Randoon/Randún) in the early Irish sources. A ráth (anglicised rath) was made of earth; caiseal (northwestern Ireland, anglicised cashel) and cathair (southwestern Ireland) were built of stone. A dún is a more prestigious site, the seat of a local chieftain or ruler; the term is also applied to promontory forts.

== Locations ==
No historical or archaeological maps, surveys, nor records of the Early Medieval Period in Ireland approach the dates of the Irish ringforts. The areas surrounding Lough Lene (meaning "fertile soil") of Collinstown, Glenidan, Comerstown, Ranaghan, are dotted with ringforts, testifying to the land of fertile soil.

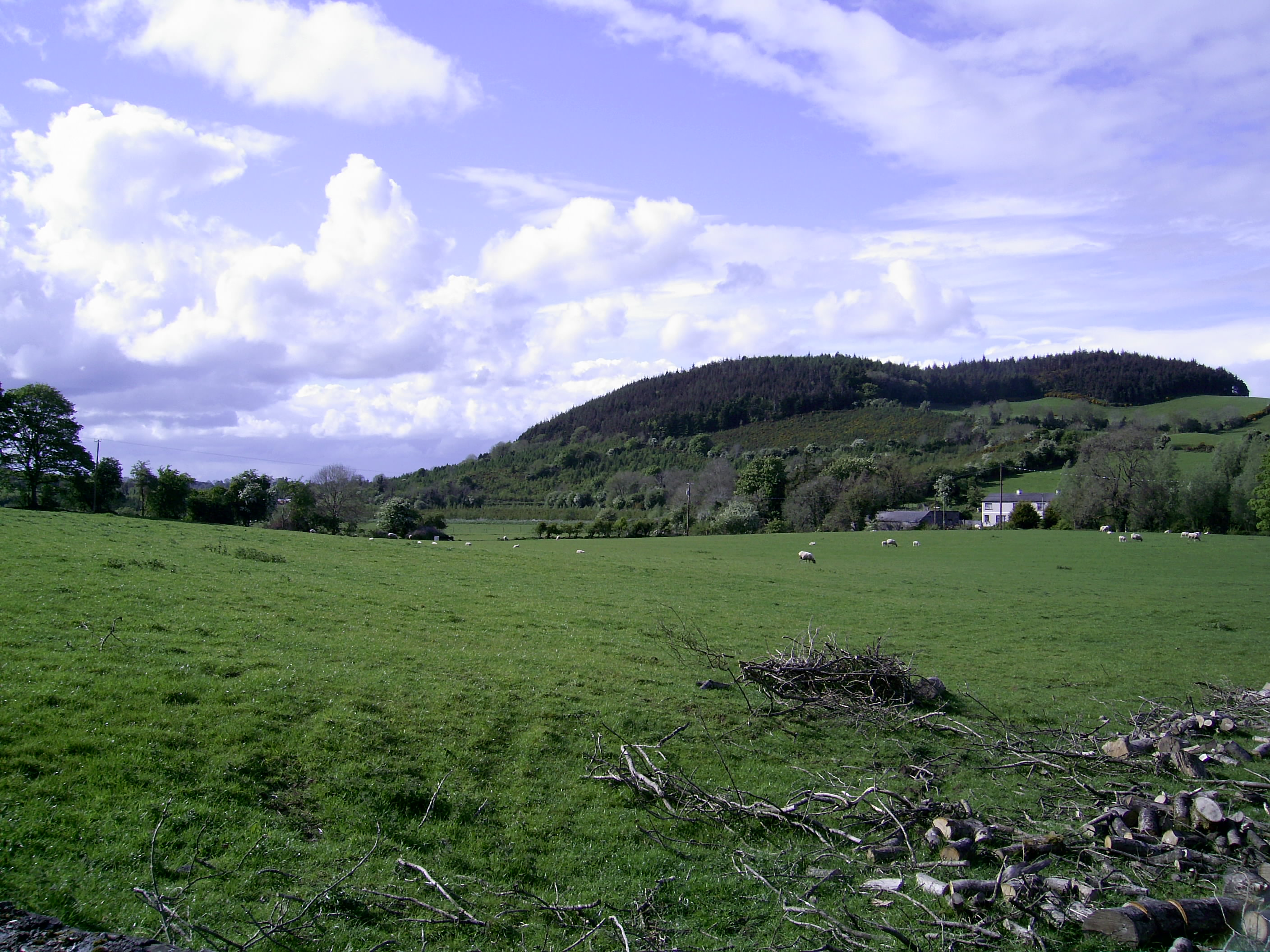
Gillardstown: view to Ranagahan Hills

Overgrown ringforts, Ranaghan Hills

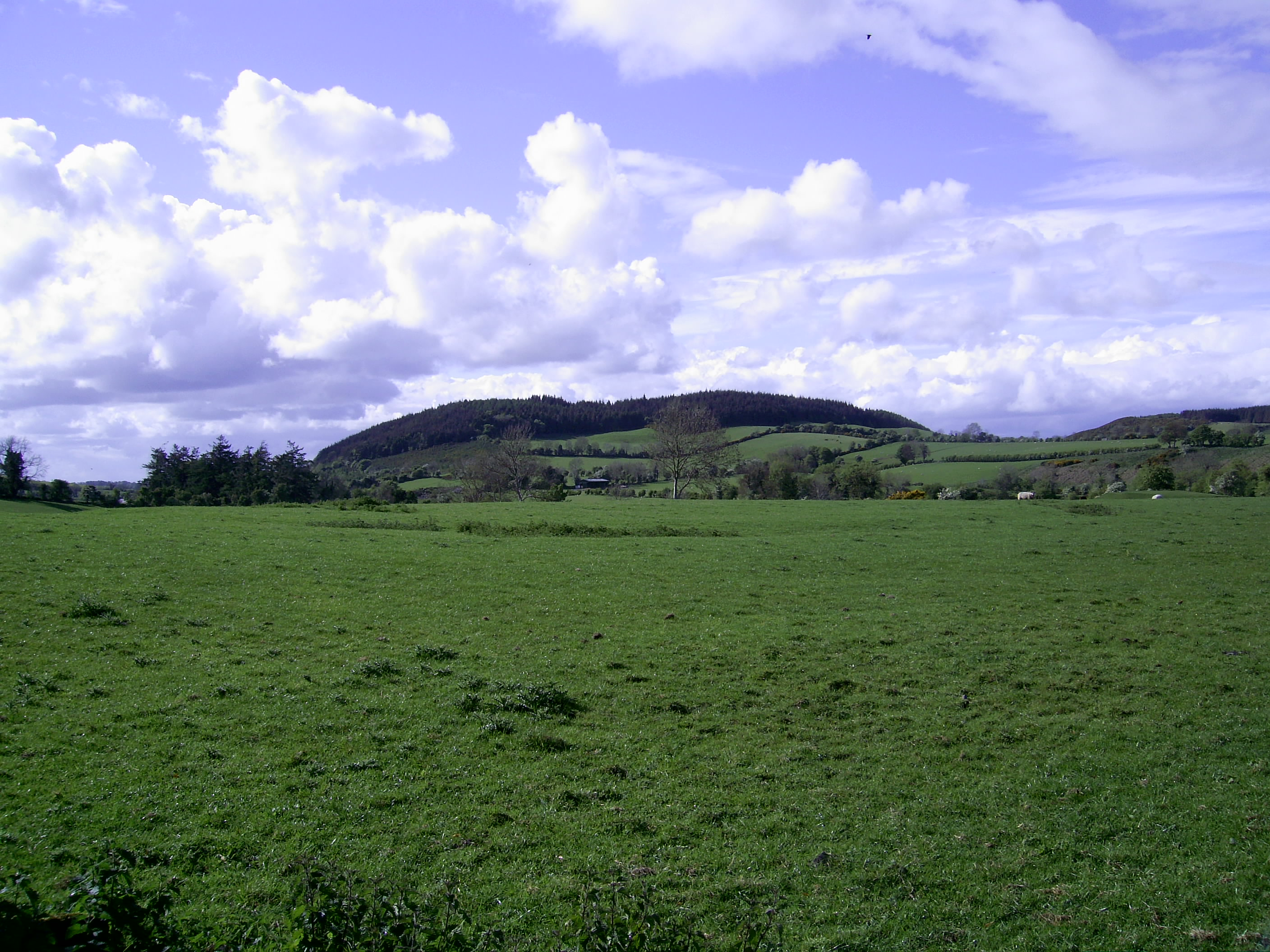
Gillardstown and Ranagahan Hills

== See also ==
- Grianan of Aileach
- Hill of Tara
- Turgesius
