= Killallon =

Civil parish in County Meath, Ireland

Killallon civil parish is situated in the barony of Fore, County Meath. It has an area of 7,626 acres (30.86 km^{2}).

== Etymology ==
The parish was originally named after the early Irish church founded there in the 6th century by Saint Dallán Forgaill. The Preface to the Amhra Coluim Cille states Dallán composed the poem in County Meath. The original name of the church was Cill Dalláin, meaning 'The Church of Dallán'. The Irish name was later corrupted into different spellings such as Killalon, Killaloone, etc. John O'Donovan (scholar) in his Ordnance Survey Letters for Meath stated- The parish of Killallon is called by the Irish 'Cill Dhaluain' i.e. Ecclesia Daluani or Cella Sancti Dallani. The patron saint of the parish had been changed by 1836 to Saint Bartholomew the Apostle, probably by the later Norman landowners, but O'Donovan said this change of name was not unusual. Paul Walsh in 'The Placenames of Westmeath' disputes O'Donovan's interpretation and claims the parish is named after the leading branch of Clann Cholmáin Bicc known as the Coille Follamain or Caille Follamain, after the King of Meath Fallomon mac Con Congalt who died in 766 AD. However Hogan's Onomasticon Goedelicum and the Martyrology of Donegal (under 14 September) both state that Caille Follamain is in the parish of Russagh, County Westmeath which is 20 miles away from Killallon. The 1938 Dúchas Folklore collection gives a history of the churches and folklore in the parish. The present church is situated in Boherard townland.

== Townlands ==
The townlands of Killallon civil parish are-

Boherard; Cloneveran; Clongowny; Dunnagorran; Galboystown; Geehanstown; Gibbonstown; Glebe; Harstown; Herbertstown; Keenaghan; Killacroy; Kingsmountain; Lakefield; Loughanbrean; Loughanderg; Monennigan; Newtown; Pigotstown; Rathbrack; Seraghstown; Shanco; Sranaboll and Stirrupstown.
