= Moyashel and Magheradernon =

Barony in County Westmeath, Ireland

Moyashel and Magheradernon Maigh Asail agus Machaire Ó dTiarnáin
- Barony
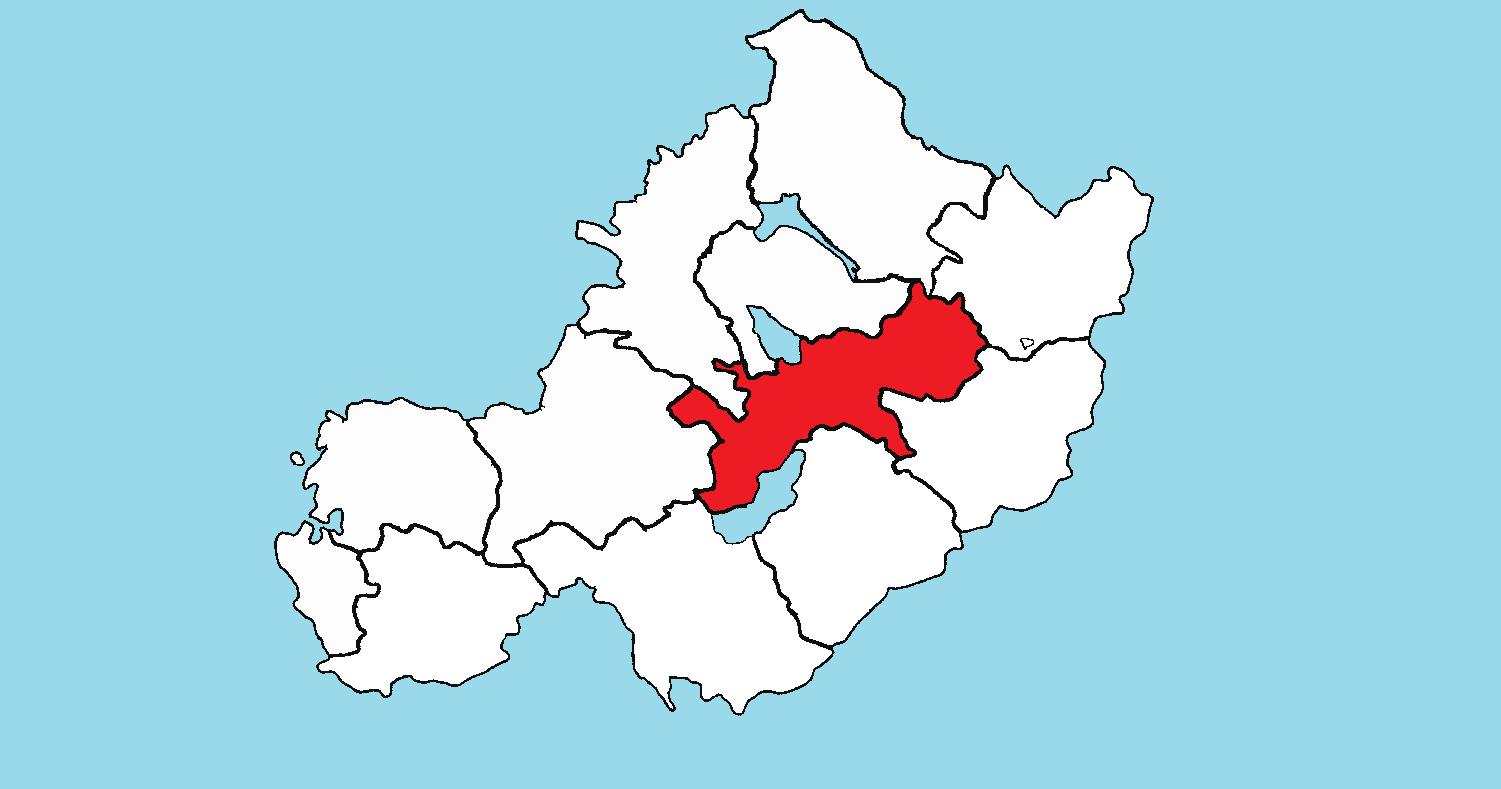
- Location of Moyashel and Magheradernon on a map of Westmeath

- Location in Ireland
- Coordinates: 53°31′57″N 7°19′53″W
- Country: Ireland
- Province: Leinster
- County: Westmeath

Area
  - Total: 177.2 km^{2} (68.4 sq mi)
- Time zone: UTC+0 (WET)
  - Summer (DST): UTC+1 (IST (WEST))
- Irish Grid Reference: N443538

Moyashel and Magheradernon (Irish: Maigh Asail agus Machaire Ó dTiarnáin) is a barony in the centre of County Westmeath, in Ireland, formed by 1672. It is bordered by eight other baronies: Corkaree and Fore (to the north), Delvin and Farbill (to the east), Fartullagh and Moycashel (to the south) and Rathconrath and Moygoish (to the west).

== Geography ==
Moyashel and Magheradernon has an area of 43,779.6 acres (177.170 km^{2}). The barony contains parts of two large lakes; Lough Ennell, shared with the barony of Fartullagh, and Lough Owel, an internationally recognised Ramsar waterfowl habitat. The River Brosna, rises in Lough Owel and is a tributary of the River Shannon. The N4, a national primary road passes through the barony to the north of Mullingar, connecting Dublin with the northwest of Ireland and the coastal town of Sligo. Railway lines carrying the national rail company Iarnród Éireann's Dublin to Longford commuter service and Dublin to Sligo intercity service stop in the barony at Mullingar railway station. The Royal Canal passes through the town of Mullingar connecting the River Liffey in Dublin to Longford town.

== Civil parishes of the barony ==
This table lists an historical geographical sub-division of the barony known as the civil parish (not to be confused with an Ecclesiastical parish).

| Name in English | Name in Irish |
|---|---|
| Dysart | An Díseart |
| Mullingar | An Muileann gCearr |
| Rathconnell | Rú Chonaill |

== Towns, villages and townlands ==
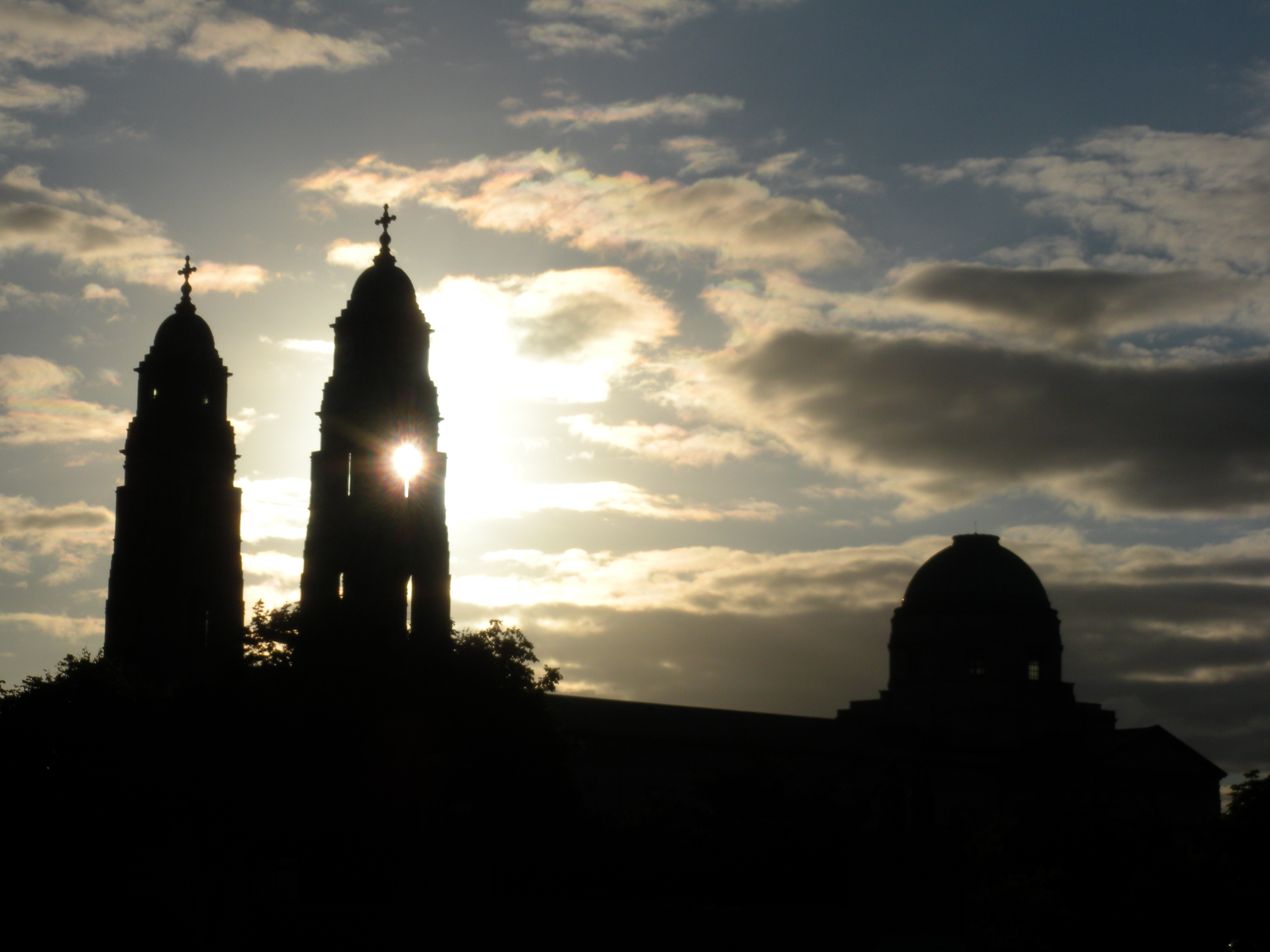
Christ The King Cathedral at sunset

- Ballina, a small village on the R390. Ballinea Bridge crosses over the Royal Canal.
- Mullingar (Irish: An Muileann gCearr, meaning 'the left-handed mill') is the county town of County Westmeath.

There are 100 townlands in the barony of Moyashel and Magheradernon.

== Buildings of Interest ==
- Christ The King Cathedral, Mullingar
