= Fore (County Westmeath barony) =

Barony in County Westmeath, Ireland

Fore Baile Fhobhair
- Town
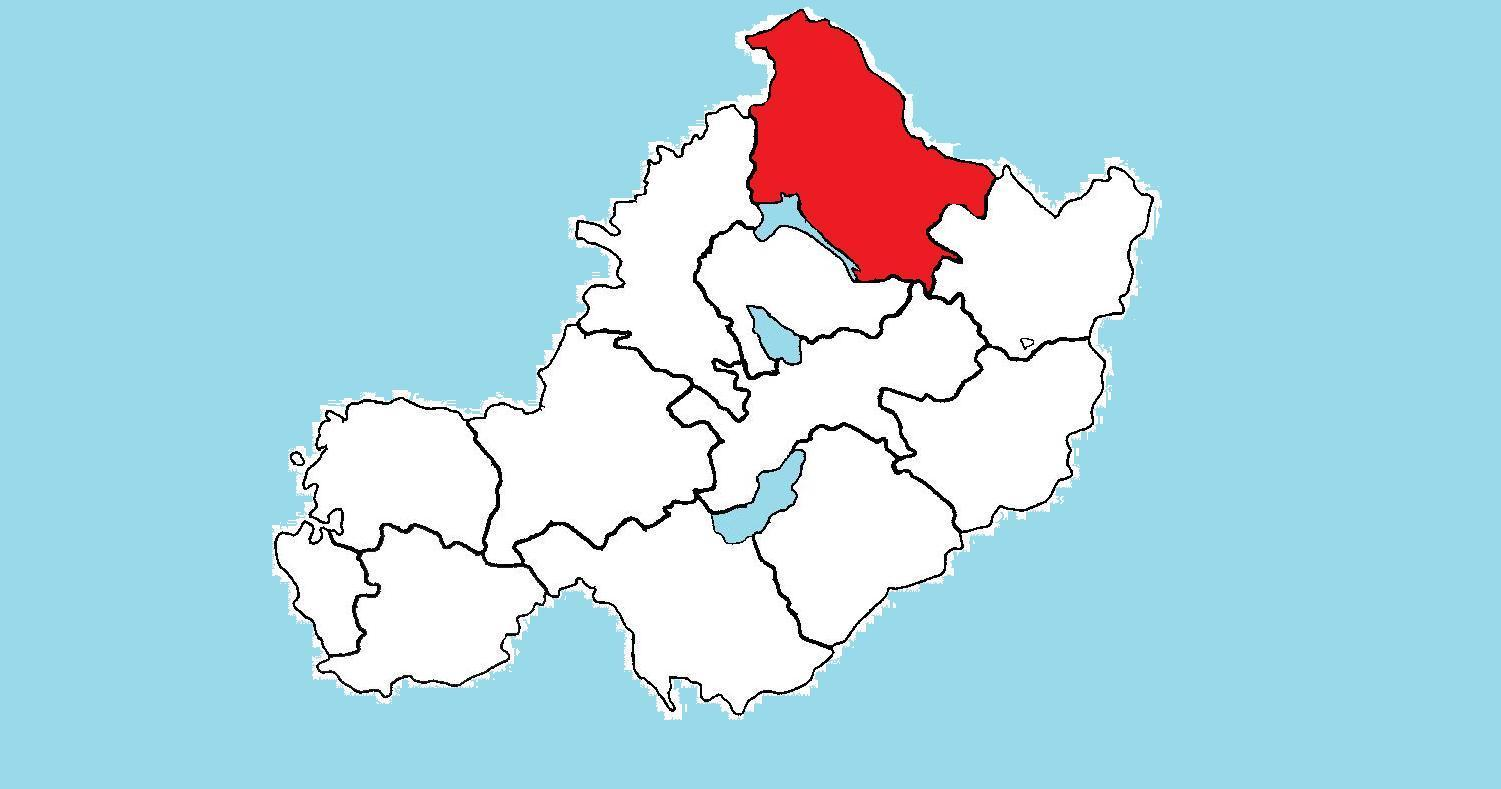
- Location of Fore on a map of Westmeath

- Location in Ireland
- Coordinates: 53°42′43″N 7°18′47″W
- Country: Ireland
- Province: Leinster
- County: Westmeath

Area
  - Total: 199 km^{2} (77 sq mi)
- Time zone: UTC+0 (WET)
  - Summer (DST): UTC+1 (IST (WEST))
- Irish Grid Reference: N453738

Fore (Irish: Baile Fhobhair) is a barony in northern County Westmeath, Ireland. It was formed by 1672.

== Geography ==
Fore has an area of 49,056 acres, making it the largest barony in Westmeath but placing it among the smaller baronies in Ireland. Mullaghmeen, the highest point in Westmeath is located in Fore and at 261 metres (856 ft) is the lowest county high point in Ireland. The barony contains three large lakes, Lough Derravaragh, Lough Sheelin and Lough Lene and the River Inny flows through the barony before it connects to the River Shannon. The barony borders the counties of Cavan, Longford and Meath.

== Civil parishes of the barony ==
This table lists an historical geographical sub-division of the barony known as the civil parish (not to be confused with an Ecclesiastical parish).

Name in English	Name in Irish
Faughalstown	Fochla
Foyran	Faobhrán
Kilpatrick	Cill Phádraig
Lickbla	–
Mayne	Maighean
Rathgarve	Ráth Garbh
St. Feighin's	–
St. Mary's	–

== Towns and villages ==
- Castlepollard
- Collinstown
- Coole
- Finnea
- Fore

== Places of interest ==
- Fore Abbey, Benedictine Abbey from 630 A.D
- Lough Lene, a scenic 5 square kilometres (1.9 sq mi) lough
- Lough Derravaragh, a 12 square kilometres (4.6 sq mi) lough, shaped somewhat like Italy, popular angling destination
- Lough Sheelin, a 19 square kilometres (7.3 sq mi) lough, largest lake in Westmeath
- Mullaghmeen, Highest point in Westmeath
- Ranaghan, ringfort location
- Tullynally Castle, historic castle
- Castlepollard, largest urban area in Fore
