= List of townlands of County Westmeath =

This is a sortable table of the approximately 1,376 townlands in County Westmeath, Ireland.

Duplicate names occur where there is more than one townland with the same name in the county. Names marked in bold typeface are towns, and the word Town appears for those entries in the Acres column.

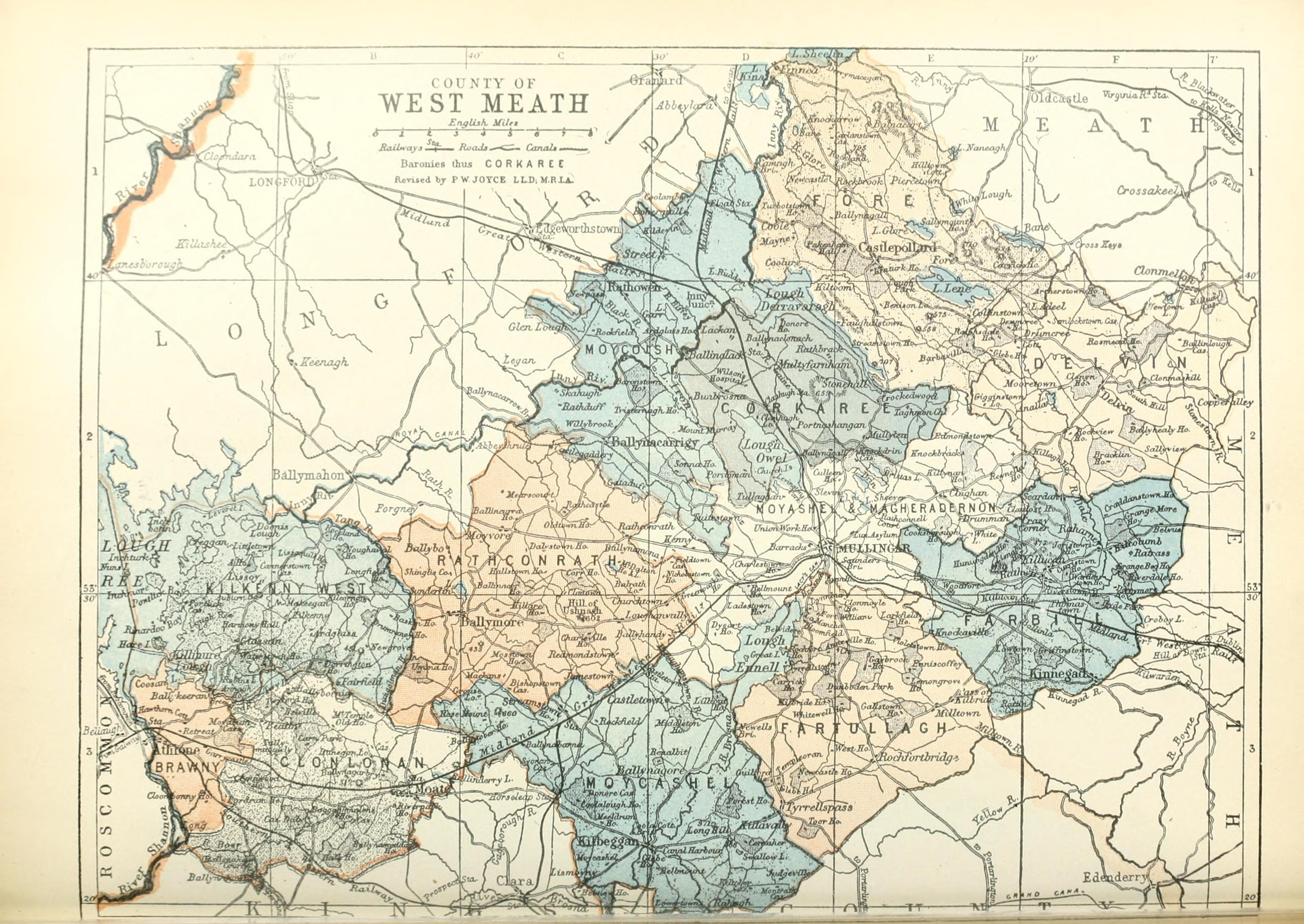
Map of Baronies of County Westmeath

== Townland list ==
Townland	Acres	Barony	Civil parish	Poor law union
Abbeyland	75	Corkaree	Multyfarnham	Mullingar
Abbeyland and Charlestown (or Ballynamonaster)	230	Moygoish	Kilbixy	Mullingar
Adamstown	35	Rathconrath	Conry	Mullingar
Adamstown	551	Moycashel	Castletownkindalen	Mullingar
Addinstown	968	Delvin	Castletowndelvin	Castletowndelvin
Aghabrack	127	Rathconrath	Conry	Mullingar
Aghacocara	32	Brawny	St. Mary's	Athlone
Aghadaugh	256	Moyashel and Magheradernon	Rathconnell	Mullingar
Aghafin	115	Clonlonan	Kilcleagh	Athlone
Aghafin	145	Kilkenny West	Noughaval	Ballymahon
Aghalasty & Ankersland	307	Fore	St. Mary's	Castletowndelvin
Aghamore	32	Moycashel	Kilbeggan	Tullamore
Aghamore	574	Farbill	Killucan	Mullingar
Aghanamanagh (or Commeenlonagh)	59	Moycashel	Newtown	Mullingar
Aghanapisha	28	Kilkenny West	Noughaval	Ballymahon
Aghanargit	120	Clonlonan	Kilcleagh	Athlone
Aghanashanamore	41	Clonlonan	Ballyloughloe	Athlone
Aghanvoneen	121	Clonlonan	Ballyloughloe	Athlone
Agharanny	25	Clonlonan	Kilcleagh	Athlone
Agharevagh East	41	Clonlonan	Kilcleagh	Athlone
Agharevagh West	24	Clonlonan	Kilcleagh	Athlone
Aghavoneen	169	Clonlonan	Kilcleagh	Athlone
Aghnabohy	295	Rathconrath	Piercetown	Ballymahon
Aghnasullivan	62	Clonlonan	Kilcleagh	Athlone
Aghuldred	174	Moycashel	Kilbeggan	Tullamore
Aghyrassy	91	Moycashel	Newtown	Mullingar
Ankersbower	58	Brawny	St. Mary's	Athlone
Ankersland & Aghalasty	307	Fore	St. Mary's	Castletowndelvin
Annagh	810	Kilkenny West	Kilkenny West	Athlone
Annaghgortagh	171	Clonlonan	Ballyloughloe	Athlone
Annaskinnan	511	Farbill	Killucan	Mullingar
Anneville (or Rathduff)	335	Fartullagh	Moylisker	Mullingar
Archerstown	822	Delvin	Castletowndelvin	Castletowndelvin
Ardan	196	Moycashel	Rahugh	Tullamore
Ardballymore	112	Moycashel	Ardnurcher or Horseleap	Tullamore
Ardborra	192	Kilkenny West	Drumraney	Ballymahon
Ardbrennan	240	Rathconrath	Killare	Mullingar
Ardbuckan	151	Kilkenny West	Drumraney	Ballymahon
Ardillon	95	Fartullagh	Lynn	Mullingar
Ardivaghan	88	Moyashel and Magheradernon	Mullingar	Mullingar
Ardmore	151	Moyashel and Magheradernon	Mullingar	Mullingar
Ardmorney	152	Moycashel	Newtown	Mullingar
Ardnacrany North	813	Kilkenny West	Noughaval	Ballymahon
Ardnacrany South	162	Kilkenny West	Noughaval	Ballymahon
Ardnaglew	351	Moycashel	Kilbeggan	Tullamore
Ardnaglug	24	Brawny	St. Mary's	Athlone
Ardnagragh	13	Kilkenny West	Drumraney	Ballymahon
Ardnagragh Digby	650	Kilkenny West	Drumraney	Ballymahon
Ardnagragh Gray	261	Kilkenny West	Drumraney	Ballymahon
Ardnagross	220	Fore	Lickbla	Granard
Ardnaponra	71	Clonlonan	Kilmanaghan	Athlone
Ardnurcher	296	Moycashel	Ardnurcher or Horseleap	Mullingar
Ardyduffy	87	Clonlonan	Ballyloughloe	Athlone
Athenboy	69	Moygoish	Street	Granard
**Athlone**	Town	Brawny	St. Mary's	Athlone
Athlone	378	Brawny	St. Mary's	Athlone
Atticonor	440	Moycashel	Rahugh	Tullamore
Attimurtagh	62	Clonlonan	Kilcleagh	Athlone
Auburn	151	Kilkenny West	Kilkenny West	Athlone
Balgarrett	413	Moyashel and Magheradernon	Mullingar	Mullingar
Ballagh	217	Moyashel and Magheradernon	Mullingar	Mullingar
Ballagh	82	Clonlonan	Kilcumreragh	Athlone
Ballaghkeeran Big	302	Kilkenny West	Kilkenny West	Athlone
Ballaghkeeran Little	30	Kilkenny West	Kilkenny West	Athlone
Ballallen	441	Moygoish	Kilbixy	Mullingar
Ballany	440	Fore	St. Feighins	Castletowndelvin
Ballard	203	Rathconrath	Rathconrath	Mullingar
Ballard	256	Moycashel	Ardnurcher or Horseleap	Tullamore
Ballard	438	Corkaree	Portloman	Mullingar
Balleagny	191	Moyashel and Magheradernon	Mullingar	Mullingar
Balleighter (or Lowtown)	395	Farbill	Killucan	Mullingar
Ballew	27	Moygoish	Street	Granard
Ballina	261	Moyashel and Magheradernon	Mullingar	Mullingar
Ballinacor (or Clonboy)	371	Rathconrath	Killare	Mullingar
**Ballinalack**	Town	Corkaree	Leny	Mullingar
Ballinalack	151	Corkaree	Leny	Mullingar
Ballinaspick (or Bishopstown)	1,572	Rathconrath	Killare	Mullingar
Ballincurra	201	Rathconrath	Piercetown	Ballymahon
Ballinderry	452	Moyashel and Magheradernon	Mullingar	Mullingar
Ballinderry	989	Clonlonan	Kilcumreragh	Athlone
Ballinderry Big	476	Moycashel	Kilbeggan	Tullamore
Ballinderry Little	241	Moycashel	Kilbeggan	Tullamore
Ballindurrow	426	Corkaree	Multyfarnham	Mullingar
Ballinealoe	565	Fore	Mayne	Granard
Ballinive	147	Rathconrath	Killare	Mullingar
Ballinkeeny (or Mosstown)	212	Rathconrath	Killare	Mullingar
Ballinla	210	Farbill	Killucan	Mullingar
Ballinlaban	457	Moycashel	Ardnurcher or Horseleap	Mullingar
Ballinlassy	182	Clonlonan	Kilcleagh	Athlone
Ballinlavan	55	Rathconrath	Killare	Mullingar
Ballinlig	145	Delvin	Castletowndelvin	Castletowndelvin
Ballinlig	157	Moycashel	Kilcumreragh	Athlone
Ballinlig Lower	281	Rathconrath	Ballymore	Athlone
Ballinlig Upper	248	Rathconrath	Ballymore	Athlone
Ballinlough (Wadding)	294	Delvin	Castletowndelvin	Castletowndelvin
Ballinlough	159	Kilkenny West	Bunown	Athlone
Ballinlough	432	Delvin	Killua	Castletowndelvin
Ballinlug	316	Rathconrath	Rathconrath	Mullingar
Ballinn	243	Delvin	Castletowndelvin	Castletowndelvin
Ballinphort	325	Corkaree	Multyfarnham	Mullingar
Ballinriddera	360	Corkaree	Multyfarnham	Mullingar
Ballintlevy	137	Fartullagh	Enniscoffey	Mullingar
Ballintober	530	Moycashel	Kilcumreragh	Athlone
Ballintue	669	Moygoish	Kilmacnevan	Mullingar
Ballinure (or Ballyhealy)	884	Delvin	Castletowndelvin	Castletowndelvin
Ballinvally	264	Delvin	Castletowndelvin	Castletowndelvin
Ballinwire	258	Moycashel	Kilbeggan	Tullamore
Balloughter (or Hightown)	1,283	Farbill	Killucan	Mullingar
Ballybeg	226	Fore	Faughalstown	Castletowndelvin
Ballybeg	244	Clonlonan	Kilcumreragh	Athlone
Ballyboy (or Lowpark)	262	Kilkenny West	Kilkenny West	Athlone
Ballyboy	169	Corkaree	Portloman	Mullingar
Ballybrennan	405	Moycashel	Castletownkindalen	Mullingar
Ballybrickoge	465	Moycashel	Kilcumreragh	Athlone
Ballybroder	243	Moycashel	Durrow	Tullamore
Ballybroder	95	Clonlonan	Kilcumreragh	Athlone
Ballybrown	104	Moycashel	Castletownkindalen	Mullingar
Ballycahan	368	Moycashel	Durrow	Tullamore
Ballycahillroe	222	Clonlonan	Kilcleagh	Athlone
Ballycloghduff (Molston)	283	Kilkenny West	Drumraney	Athlone
Ballycloghduff	230	Kilkenny West	Drumraney	Athlone
Ballyclogher	83	Rathconrath	Killare	Mullingar
Ballycomoyle	465	Fore	Rathgarve	Castletowndelvin
Ballycor	331	Moyashel and Magheradernon	Rathconnell	Mullingar
Ballycorkey	402	Moygoish	Kilbixy	Mullingar
Ballydavid	99	Rathconrath	Killare	Ballymahon
Ballydonagh	62	Clonlonan	Kilcleagh	Athlone
Ballydoogan	532	Clonlonan	Ballyloughloe	Athlone
Ballydorey	60	Moygoish	Rathaspick	Granard
Ballyedward	45	Corkaree	Tyfarnham	Mullingar
Ballygarran	145	Moygoish	Rathaspick	Granard
Ballygarvey	261	Moygoish	Rathaspick	Mullingar
Ballygarveybeg	530	Moygoish	Rathaspick	Mullingar
Ballygillin	168	Delvin	Killulagh	Castletowndelvin
Ballyglass	143	Moyashel and Magheradernon	Mullingar	Mullingar
Ballyglass	152	Rathconrath	Rathconrath	Mullingar
Ballygowlan	90	Brawny	St. Mary's	Athlone
Ballyhandy	74	Rathconrath	Dysart	Mullingar
Ballyharney	577	Corkaree	Lackan	Mullingar
Ballyhast	517	Moycashel	Castletownkindalen	Mullingar
Ballyhattan	102	Moycashel	Ardnurcher or Horseleap	Mullingar
Ballyhaw	227	Farbill	Killucan	Mullingar
Ballyhealy (or Ballinure)	884	Delvin	Castletowndelvin	Castletowndelvin
Ballyhoreen	213	Moygoish	Kilbixy	Mullingar
Ballyhug	350	Moygoish	Kilbixy	Mullingar
Ballykeeran	415	Brawny	St. Mary's	Athlone
Ballykildevin	105	Moygoish	Street	Granard
Ballykilmore	330	Fartullagh	Newtown	Mullingar
Ballykilroe	457	Moycashel	Castletownkindalen	Mullingar
Ballymacahil and Derries	428	Delvin	Kilcumny	Castletowndelvin
Ballymacallen	579	Rathconrath	Killare	Ballymahon
Ballymacartan	129	Rathconrath	Killare	Ballymahon
Ballymachugh	352	Moycashel	Newtown	Mullingar
Ballymacmorris	485	Moycashel	Kilbeggan	Tullamore
Ballymaghery	34	Delvin	Killagh	Castletowndelvin
Ballymaglavy	803	Rathconrath	Piercetown	Mullingar
Ballymanus	486	Fore	Rathgarve	Castletowndelvin
**Ballymore**	Town	Rathconrath	Ballymore	Ballymahon
**Ballymore**	Town	Rathconrath	Killare	Ballymahon
Ballymore	676	Rathconrath	Ballymore	Ballymahon
Ballymorin	290	Rathconrath	Ballymorin	Mullingar
Ballymurry	89	Clonlonan	Ballyloughloe	Athlone
Ballynacarrig Old	175	Moygoish	Kilbixy	Mullingar
**Ballynacarrigy**	Town	Moygoish	Kilbixy	Mullingar
Ballynacarrigy	146	Moygoish	Kilbixy	Mullingar
Ballynacarrow	327	Moygoish	Kilmacnevan	Mullingar
Ballynacarrow	660	Rathconrath	Rathconrath	Mullingar
Ballynacliffy	486	Kilkenny West	Kilkenny West	Athlone
Ballynaclin	222	Moyashel and Magheradernon	Mullingar	Mullingar
Ballynaclonagh	254	Corkaree	Multyfarnham	Mullingar
Ballynacor	730	Delvin	Killulagh	Castletowndelvin
Ballynacorra	232	Rathconrath	Ballymore	Ballymahon
Ballynacoska	246	Moycashel	Castletownkindalen	Mullingar
Ballynacroghy (or Gallowstown)	358	Moygoish	Kilbixy	Mullingar
Ballynafearagh	163	Rathconrath	Churchtown	Mullingar
Ballynafearagh	71	Rathconrath	Ballymore	Athlone
Ballynafid	108	Corkaree	Portnashangan	Mullingar
Ballynafid	290	Corkaree	Leny	Mullingar
Ballynagall	16	Corkaree	Tyfarnham	Mullingar
Ballynagall	175	Fore	Lickbla	Granard
Ballynagall	24	Moyashel and Magheradernon	Rathconnell	Mullingar
Ballynagall	286	Moycashel	Kilcumreragh	Athlone
Ballynagall	33	Fore	Rathgarve	Granard
Ballynagall	358	Delvin	Kilcumny	Castletowndelvin
Ballynagall	813	Corkaree	Portnashangan	Mullingar
Ballynagall Little	114	Fore	Lickbla	Granard
Ballynagarbry (Mullock)	76	Clonlonan	Ballyloughloe	Athlone
Ballynagarbry (Pim)	137	Clonlonan	Ballyloughloe	Athlone
Ballynagarbry	147	Clonlonan	Ballyloughloe	Athlone
**Ballynagore**	Town	Moycashel	Newtown	Mullingar
Ballynagore	58	Moycashel	Castletownkindalen	Mullingar
Ballynagrenia	608	Moycashel	Kilcumreragh	Athlone
Ballynahown	723	Clonlonan	Kilcleagh	Athlone
Ballynahownwood	1,083	Clonlonan	Kilcleagh	Athlone
Ballynakill	139	Kilkenny West	Kilkenny West	Athlone
Ballynakill	282	Corkaree	Multyfarnham	Mullingar
Ballynakill	676	Clonlonan	Kilcleagh	Athlone
Ballynakill Upper	42	Kilkenny West	Kilkenny West	Athlone
Ballynalone	23	Kilkenny West	Drumraney	Ballymahon
Ballynalone	263	Kilkenny West	Noughaval	Ballymahon
Ballynameagh	500	Fore	Lickbla	Granard
Ballynamonaster (or Charlestown and Abbeyland)	230	Moygoish	Kilbixy	Mullingar
Ballynamuddagh	639	Clonlonan	Kilcleagh	Athlone
Ballynamullen	49	Moycashel	Ardnurcher or Horseleap	Mullingar
Ballynascarry	628	Fore	Foyran	Granard
Ballynaskeagh	334	Delvin	Killagh	Castletowndelvin
Ballynaskeagh	381	Delvin	Castletowndelvin	Castletowndelvin
Ballynasudder	171	Moycashel	Kilbeggan	Tullamore
Ballyoban	78	Moycashel	Kilbeggan	Tullamore
Ballyote	127	Moyashel and Magheradernon	Dysart	Mullingar
Ballyowen	160	Delvin	Killagh	Castletowndelvin
Ballysallagh (Fox)	286	Moygoish	Kilbixy	Mullingar
Ballysallagh (Tuite)	254	Moygoish	Kilbixy	Mullingar
Ballysallagh	246	Kilkenny West	Drumraney	Athlone
Ballyscarvan	253	Clonlonan	Kilcleagh	Athlone
Ballyvade	224	Corkaree	Leny	Mullingar
Balnamona (or Charlestown)	94	Moyashel and Magheradernon	Mullingar	Mullingar
Balnavine	297	Fore	St. Marys	Castletowndelvin
Balrath	132	Moycashel	Castletownkindalen	Mullingar
Balrath	180	Fore	Lickbla	Granard
Balrath	215	Rathconrath	Rathconrath	Mullingar
Balrath	278	Corkaree	Portloman	Mullingar
Balrath	925	Rathconrath	Churchtown	Mullingar
Balrath North	182	Delvin	Castletowndelvin	Castletowndelvin
Balrath North	72	Moyashel and Magheradernon	Rathconnell	Mullingar
Balrath South	353	Delvin	Castletowndelvin	Castletowndelvin
Balrath West	96	Moyashel and Magheradernon	Rathconnell	Mullingar
Balreagh	827	Moyashel and Magheradernon	Rathconnell	Mullingar
Balreath East	386	Moyashel and Magheradernon	Rathconnell	Mullingar
Balroe	525	Moygoish	Kilbixy	Mullingar
Balrowan (Pakenham)	144	Farbill	Killucan	Mullingar
Balrowan (Rowely) & Kerinstown	747	Farbill	Killucan	Mullingar
Baltrasna	145	Clonlonan	Kilcleagh	Athlone
Baltrasna	788	Moyashel and Magheradernon	Mullingar	Mullingar
Banagher	344	Farbill	Killucan	Mullingar
Bananstown	31	Delvin	Kilcumny	Castletowndelvin
Barbavilla Demesne	581	Fore	St. Feighins	Castletowndelvin
Bardanstown	304	Moygoish	Rathaspick	Mullingar
Baronstown	160	Moygoish	Kilbixy	Mullingar
Baronstown Demesne	929	Moygoish	Kilbixy	Mullingar
Barradrum	416	Moygoish	Street	Granard
Barratogher	166	Moygoish	Russagh	Granard
Barrettstown	261	Rathconrath	Dysart	Mullingar
Baskin High	661	Kilkenny West	Drumraney	Ballymahon
Baskin Low	598	Kilkenny West	Drumraney	Ballymahon
Battstown	437	Delvin	Killulagh	Castletowndelvin
Bawn	55	Kilkenny West	Noughaval	Ballymahon
Bawnoges	171	Clonlonan	Kilmanaghan	Athlone
Beggstown	81	Fartullagh	Kilbride	Mullingar
Bellanalack	194	Clonlonan	Ballyloughloe	Athlone
Bellfield (or Brannockstown)	455	Fartullagh	Enniscoffey	Mullingar
Bellmount (or Curristown)	195	Moyashel and Magheradernon	Mullingar	Mullingar
Bellview	24	Moyashel and Magheradernon	Mullingar	Mullingar
Beltacken	136	Rathconrath	Templepatrick	Ballymahon
Belvidere	42	Fartullagh	Moylisker	Mullingar
Belville	242	Clonlonan	Ballyloughloe	Athlone
Ben	458	Fore	St. Feighins	Castletowndelvin
Benalbit & Derryroe	407	Moycashel	Castletownkindalen	Mullingar
Benisonlodge (or Bratty)	449	Fore	St. Feighins	Castletowndelvin
Bessville	40	Rathconrath	Killare	Mullingar
Bethlehem	182	Kilkenny West	Kilkenny West	Athlone
Bifurze	113	Rathconrath	Rathconrath	Mullingar
Bigwood	442	Fore	Lickbla	Granard
Billstown	419	Delvin	Castletowndelvin	Castletowndelvin
Bishopstown (or Ballinaspick)	1,572	Rathconrath	Killare	Mullingar
Blackislands (or Windmill)	152	Fartullagh	Enniscoffey	Mullingar
Blackmiles	151	Corkaree	Stonehall	Mullingar
Blackories	45	Clonlonan	Kilcleagh	Athlone
Bleachlawn	80	Kilkenny West	Drumraney	Ballymahon
Bleanphuttoge	160	Kilkenny West	Kilkenny West	Athlone
Blyry Lower	355	Brawny	St. Mary's	Athlone
Blyry Upper	43	Brawny	St. Mary's	Athlone
Boardsland	79	Kilkenny West	Kilkenny West	Athlone
Boardstown	114	Moyashel and Magheradernon	Mullingar	Mullingar
Boggagh (Conran)	150	Clonlonan	Kilcleagh	Athlone
Boggagh (Fury)	106	Clonlonan	Kilcleagh	Athlone
Boggagh (Malone)	89	Clonlonan	Kilcleagh	Athlone
Boggagh Eighter	234	Clonlonan	Kilcleagh	Athlone
Boherquill	173	Moygoish	Street	Granard
Bolandstown	251	Delvin	Castletowndelvin	Castletowndelvin
Bolinarra	278	Clonlonan	Kilcleagh	Athlone
Bolyconor	140	Clonlonan	Kilcleagh	Athlone
Bottomy	810	Moygoish	Street	Granard
Boyanagh (Earl)	111	Clonlonan	Kilcleagh	Athlone
Boyanagh (Malone)	175	Clonlonan	Kilcleagh	Athlone
Boyanaghcalry	128	Clonlonan	Ballyloughloe	Athlone
Brackagh	179	Fartullagh	Carrick	Mullingar
Brackagh	47	Kilkenny West	Noughaval	Ballymahon
Brackagh Castle	27	Moycashel	Ardnurcher or Horseleap	Tullamore
Bracklin	2,730	Delvin	Killulagh	Castletowndelvin
Bracknahevla	344	Rathconrath	Killare	Mullingar
Brannockstown (or Bellfield)	455	Fartullagh	Enniscoffey	Mullingar
Bratty (or Benisonlodge)	449	Fore	St. Feighins	Castletowndelvin
Bredagh	69	Moycashel	Castletownkindalen	Mullingar
Brittas	185	Moyashel and Magheradernon	Rathconnell	Mullingar
Brittas	269	Kilkenny West	Kilkenny West	Athlone
Brockagh	342	Moyashel and Magheradernon	Mullingar	Mullingar
Brottonstown	212	Moyashel and Magheradernon	Mullingar	Mullingar
Brottonstown Little	59	Moyashel and Magheradernon	Mullingar	Mullingar
Brownscurragh	86	Moycashel	Kilbeggan	Tullamore
Brownstown	837	Delvin	Castletowndelvin	Castletowndelvin
Brutonstown	200	Farbill	Killucan	Mullingar
Brutonstown Little	68	Farbill	Killucan	Mullingar
Bryanmore Lower	152	Kilkenny West	Drumraney	Ballymahon
Bryanmore Upper	115	Kilkenny West	Drumraney	Ballymahon
Bryanstown	612	Moyashel and Magheradernon	Dysart	Mullingar
Bunanagh	161	Moycashel	Ardnurcher or Horseleap	Mullingar
Bunnahinly	434	Brawny	St. Mary's	Athlone
Bunnavally	114	Brawny	St. Mary's	Athlone
Bunown	357	Kilkenny West	Bunown	Athlone
Burgesland	137	Moygoish	Street	Granard
Burnellstown	113	Fartullagh	Lynn	Mullingar
Byanbeg Lower	87	Kilkenny West	Drumraney	Ballymahon
Byanbeg Upper	107	Kilkenny West	Drumraney	Ballymahon
Caddagh	182	Delvin	Castletowndelvin	Castletowndelvin
Calliaghstown	1,015	Rathconrath	Ballymore	Ballymahon
Calliaghstown	401	Moygoish	Kilmacnevan	Mullingar
Calverstown	406	Fartullagh	Clonfad	Mullingar
Camagh	50	Moycashel	Kilbeggan	Tullamore
Camagh	678	Fore	Lickbla	Granard
Cannonsfield	16	Brawny	St. Mary's	Athlone
Cannorstown (Chapman)	67	Kilkenny West	Noughaval	Ballymahon
Cannorstown (Hogan)	45	Kilkenny West	Noughaval	Ballymahon
Caplahard	56	Kilkenny West	Kilkenny West	Athlone
Cappaduff	170	Moycashel	Ardnurcher or Horseleap	Mullingar
Cappagh	1,138	Moygoish	Russagh	Mullingar
Cappaghauneen	58	Clonlonan	Ballyloughloe	Athlone
Cappaghbrack	208	Clonlonan	Ballyloughloe	Athlone
Cappaghjuan	90	Rathconrath	Ballymorin	Mullingar
Cappalahy	241	Moycashel	Durrow	Tullamore
Cappankelly	137	Brawny	St. Mary's	Athlone
Cappanrush	381	Moycashel	Rahugh	Tullamore
Cappantack	88	Clonlonan	Kilmanaghan	Athlone
Caran (or Enniscoffey)	1,421	Fartullagh	Enniscoffey	Mullingar
Caraun (or Kilmacahill)	408	Moygoish	Rathaspick	Mullingar
Carberry Island	2	Brawny	St. Mary's	Athlone
Carlanstown	1,349	Fore	Lickbla	Granard
Carn	166	Fore	Foyran	Granard
Carn	724	Fore	Mayne	Granard
Carn	733	Rathconrath	Conry	Mullingar
Carnfyan	28	Clonlonan	Ballyloughloe	Athlone
Carnpark	868	Clonlonan	Ballyloughloe	Athlone
Carnybrogan	82	Delvin	Castletowndelvin	Castletowndelvin
Carpenterstown	794	Fore	St. Feighins	Castletowndelvin
Carrick	1,058	Fartullagh	Carrick	Mullingar
Carrick	173	Kilkenny West	Noughaval	Ballymahon
Carrick	303	Corkaree	Lackan	Mullingar
Carrick	331	Fore	St. Mary's	Castletowndelvin
Carrickaneha	259	Kilkenny West	Drumraney	Ballymahon
Carrickfin	154	Kilkenny West	Kilkenny West	Athlone
Carricknagower	334	Rathconrath	Ballymore	Ballymahon
Carrickobreen	472	Brawny	St. Mary's	Athlone
Carrigagh	233	Moygoish	Rathaspick	Mullingar
Cartenstown	133	Delvin	Killulagh	Castletowndelvin
Cartron	10	Moyashel and Magheradernon	Rathconnell	Mullingar
Cartron	115	Moyashel and Magheradernon	Mullingar	Mullingar
Cartron	126	Kilkenny West	Noughaval	Athlone
Cartron	355	Moygoish	Templeoran	Mullingar
Cartroncoragh	310	Kilkenny West	Drumraney	Ballymahon
Cartroncroy	226	Kilkenny West	Noughaval	Ballymahon
Cartronganny	177	Fartullagh	Mullingar	Mullingar
Cartronkeel	58	Clonlonan	Kilcleagh	Athlone
Cartronkeel	93	Kilkenny West	Kilkenny West	Athlone
Cartrons	300	Clonlonan	Kilcleagh	Athlone
Cartrontroy	105	Brawny	St. Mary's	Athlone
Caslanakirka	179	Fore	Rathgarve	Castletowndelvin
Castledown	520	Farbill	Killucan	Mullingar
Castlegaddery	371	Rathconrath	Rathconrath	Mullingar
Castlelost	635	Fartullagh	Castlelost	Mullingar
Castlelost West	538	Fartullagh	Castlelost	Mullingar
**Castlepollard**	Town	Fore	Rathgarve	Castletowndelvin
**Castletown**	Town	Moycashel	Castletownkindalen	Mullingar
Castletown	498	Clonlonan	Kilcleagh	Athlone
Castletown	691	Moycashel	Castletownkindalen	Mullingar
Castletown Lower	426	Fore	Lickbla	Granard
Castletown Upper	231	Fore	Lickbla	Granard
**Castletowndelvin**	Town	Delvin	Castletowndelvin	Castletowndelvin
Castletowndelvin	471	Delvin	Castletowndelvin	Castletowndelvin
Catherinestown	667	Fartullagh	Lynn	Mullingar
Cauran	127	Kilkenny West	Drumraney	Ballymahon
Cavestown and Rosmead	1,346	Delvin	Castletowndelvin	Castletowndelvin
Chancery	123	Moygoish	Street	Granard
Chanonstown	234	Farbill	Killucan	Mullingar
Charlestown (or Balnamona)	94	Moyashel and Magheradernon	Mullingar	Mullingar
Charlestown and Abbeyland (or Ballynamonaster)	230	Moygoish	Kilbixy	Mullingar
Christianstown	330	Fore	St. Mary's	Castletowndelvin
Churchtown	218	Rathconrath	Churchtown	Mullingar
Churchtown	473	Moygoish	Kilmacnevan	Mullingar
Clanhugh Demesne	291	Corkaree	Leny	Mullingar
Clanhugh Demesne	76	Corkaree	Portnashangan	Mullingar
Clare, County Westmeath	847	Rathconrath	Killare	Mullingar
Westmeathisland (or Derrymacegan)	224	Fore	Foyran	Granard
Westmeathmount (or Cummingstown)	451	Fartullagh	Enniscoffey	Mullingar
Cleggarnagh	53	Rathconrath	Rathconrath	Mullingar
Clinickilroe	130	Rathconrath	Killare	Ballymahon
Cloghanaskaw	204	Moycashel	Ardnurcher or Horseleap	Mullingar
Cloghanboy (Cooke)	7	Brawny	St. Mary's	Athlone
Cloghanboy (Homan)	40	Brawny	St. Mary's	Athlone
Cloghanboy (Strain)	13	Brawny	St. Mary's	Athlone
Cloghanboy West	3	Brawny	St. Mary's	Athlone
Cloghannagarragh	36	Kilkenny West	Noughaval	Athlone
Cloghanstown	109	Farbill	Killucan	Castletowndelvin
Cloghanumera	34	Moyashel and Magheradernon	Rathconnell	Mullingar
Cloghbane	108	Clonlonan	Kilmanaghan	Athlone
Cloghbreen	125	Kilkenny West	Drumraney	Ballymahon
Clogher	274	Kilkenny West	Noughaval	Ballymahon
Clonaboy	272	Moygoish	Rathaspick	Mullingar
Clonagh	44	Brawny	St. Mary's	Athlone
Clonaglin	300	Moycashel	Kilbeggan	Tullamore
Clonaltra (King)	266	Clonlonan	Kilcleagh	Athlone
Clonaltra West	78	Clonlonan	Kilcleagh	Athlone
Clonarney	271	Delvin	Clonarney	Castletowndelvin
Clonava	1,125	Moygoish	Street	Mullingar
Clonbore	241	Farbill	Killucan	Castletowndelvin
Clonboy (or Ballinacor)	371	Rathconrath	Killare	Mullingar
Clonbrusk	230	Brawny	St. Mary's	Athlone
Clonconnell	190	Moygoish	Street	Granard
Cloncrave	819	Farbill	Killucan	Mullingar
Cloncrow	489	Moycashel	Newtown	Mullingar
Cloncullen	189	Farbill	Killucan	Mullingar
Cloncullen	210	Moycashel	Newtown	Mullingar
Cloncullen	654	Rathconrath	Ballymore	Ballymahon
Clondalever	364	Moyashel and Magheradernon	Rathconnell	Mullingar
Clondalever	505	Fore	Kilpatrick	Castletowndelvin
Clondardis	11	Moyashel and Magheradernon	Mullingar	Mullingar
Clondardis	210	Moygoish	Templeoran	Mullingar
Clonfad	443	Farbill	Killucan	Mullingar
Clonfad	640	Fartullagh	Clonfad	Mullingar
Clongawny	559	Moyashel and Magheradernon	Mullingar	Mullingar
Clongowly	355	Moycashel	Ardnurcher or Horseleap	Tullamore
Clonickilvant	1,164	Moyashel and Magheradernon	Rathconnell	Mullingar
Clonkeen	558	Kilkenny West	Noughaval	Ballymahon
Clonkeen	644	Moygoish	Street	Granard
Clonkill	797	Moyashel and Magheradernon	Rathconnell	Mullingar
Clonleame	527	Delvin	Castletowndelvin	Castletowndelvin
Clonlonan	201	Clonlonan	Kilcleagh	Athlone
Clonlost	819	Moyashel and Magheradernon	Rathconnell	Mullingar
Clonmaskill	534	Delvin	Castletowndelvin	Castletowndelvin
**Clonmellon**	Town	Delvin	Killua	Castletowndelvin
Clonmellon	343	Delvin	Killua	Castletowndelvin
Clonmore	257	Clonlonan	Kilcleagh	Athlone
Clonmore	326	Moygoish	Street	Granard
Clonmore	366	Moyashel and Magheradernon	Mullingar	Mullingar
Clonmorrill	193	Delvin	Castletowndelvin	Castletowndelvin
Clonmoyle	17	Fartullagh	Lynn	Mullingar
Clonnagapple	61	Delvin	Castletowndelvin	Castletowndelvin
Clonnageeragh	675	Fore	St. Feighins	Castletowndelvin
Clonnamanagh	73	Rathconrath	Killare	Ballymahon
Clonnslynagh	103	Rathconrath	Killare	Ballymahon
Clonownmore	184	Rathconrath	Conry	Mullingar
Clonreagh	28	Farbill	Killucan	Mullingar
Clonrelick	144	Clonlonan	Ballyloughloe	Athlone
Clonrobert	156	Fore	Lickbla	Granard
Clonsheever	401	Moyashel and Magheradernon	Rathconnell	Mullingar
Clonsingle	360	Moycashel	Castletownkindalen	Mullingar
Clonsura	559	Fore	Lickbla	Granard
Clonteens	67	Fore	Mayne	Granard
Clonthread	227	Clonlonan	Ballyloughloe	Athlone
Clontinteen	160	Rathconrath	Churchtown	Mullingar
Clontytallon	121	Fartullagh	Castlelost	Mullingar
Clonybane	399	Rathconrath	Killare	Ballymahon
Clonydonnin	377	Clonlonan	Kilcleagh	Athlone
Clonyegan	246	Clonlonan	Ballyloughloe	Athlone
Clonyhague	706	Moycashel	Newtown	Mullingar
Clonymurtagh	54	Rathconrath	Ballymorin	Mullingar
Clonyn	661	Delvin	Castletowndelvin	Castletowndelvin
Clonyrina	222	Rathconrath	Conry	Mullingar
Clonyveey	212	Rathconrath	Killare	Ballymahon
Cloonagh	1,159	Moycashel	Castletownkindalen	Mullingar
Cloonbonny	1,441	Brawny	St. Mary's	Athlone
Cloondalin	118	Brawny	St. Mary's	Athlone
Cloonymurrikin	205	Moycashel	Ardnurcher or Horseleap	Tullamore
Cloran & Corcullentry	906	Delvin	Killua	Castletowndelvin
Clownstown	249	Fartullagh	Mullingar	Mullingar
Clyglass	72	Rathconrath	Killare	Mullingar
Cockstown	326	Delvin	Castletowndelvin	Castletowndelvin
Collegeland	28	Brawny	St. Mary's	Athlone
Collinstown & Kiltotan	328	Fartullagh	Castlelost	Mullingar
Collinstown	660	Fore	St. Feighins	Castletowndelvin
Commeenlonagh (or Aghanamanagh)	59	Moycashel	Newtown	Mullingar
Commons	14	Moyashel and Magheradernon	Mullingar	Mullingar
Conlanstown	549	Moygoish	Kilmacnevan	Mullingar
Conranstown	22	Moycashel	Castletownkindalen	Mullingar
Cookanamuck	3	Brawny	St. Mary's	Athlone
Cooksborough	915	Moyashel and Magheradernon	Rathconnell	Mullingar
Coola	201	Moycashel	Kilbeggan	Tullamore
Coolaleena	210	Kilkenny West	Noughaval	Athlone
Coolalough	422	Moycashel	Ardnurcher or Horseleap	Tullamore
Coolamber	182	Moygoish	Street	Granard
Coolatoor (or Grousehall)	122	Moycashel	Kilcumreragh	Athlone
Coolatoor	733	Moycashel	Kilcumreragh	Athlone
Coolcahan	107	Farbill	Killucan	Mullingar
**Coole**	Town	Fore	Mayne	Granard
Coole	896	Fore	Mayne	Granard
Cooleen	345	Clonlonan	Ballyloughloe	Athlone
Cooleighter	195	Delvin	Kilcumny	Castletowndelvin
Coolfin	162	Moycashel	Ardnurcher or Horseleap	Mullingar
Coolnagun	974	Moygoish	Street	Granard
Coolnahay	280	Moygoish	Templeoran	Mullingar
Coolure Demesne	325	Fore	Mayne	Granard
Coolvin	226	Kilkenny West	Noughaval	Ballymahon
Coolvuck Lower	274	Clonlonan	Ballyloughloe	Athlone
Coolvuck Upper	186	Clonlonan	Ballyloughloe	Athlone
Coosan	257	Brawny	St. Mary's	Athlone
Corbally	227	Fartullagh	Lynn	Mullingar
Corbally	417	Fore	St. Feighins	Castletowndelvin
Corbally	78	Farbill	Killucan	Mullingar
Corbetstown	533	Farbill	Killucan	Mullingar
Corbrack	97	Kilkenny West	Noughaval	Ballymahon
Corcloon	267	Fartullagh	Pass of Kilbride	Mullingar
Corcullentry and Cloran	906	Delvin	Killua	Castletowndelvin
Corgarve	316	Moycashel	Ardnurcher or Horseleap	Mullingar
Corkan	352	Rathconrath	Rathconrath	Mullingar
Corlis	53	Kilkenny West	Noughaval	Ballymahon
Cormaclew	196	Kilkenny West	Drumraney	Ballymahon
Cornacausk	334	Moygoish	Street	Granard
Cornacreevy	289	Fore	Foyran	Granard
Cornaher	666	Moycashel	Newtown	Mullingar
Cornamaddy	128	Brawny	St. Mary's	Athlone
Cornamagh	261	Brawny	St. Mary's	Athlone
Corr	140	Kilkenny West	Kilkenny West	Athlone
Corr	236	Kilkenny West	Drumraney	Ballymahon
Corr	391	Rathconrath	Ballymorin	Mullingar
Corralanna	1,139	Moygoish	Street	Granard
Corralena	314	Brawny	St. Mary's	Athlone
Correagh	122	Clonlonan	Ballyloughloe	Athlone
Correagh	344	Moycashel	Ardnurcher or Horseleap	Tullamore
Correaly	615	Moygoish	Street	Granard
Correllstown	598	Farbill	Killucan	Mullingar
Corry	362	Moygoish	Rathaspick	Mullingar
Corrydonellan	358	Moygoish	Russagh	Granard
Coyne	215	Rathconrath	Churchtown	Mullingar
Craddanstown	2,231	Farbill	Killucan	Castletowndelvin
Creaghduff	318	Brawny	St. Mary's	Athlone
Creaghduff South	26	Brawny	St. Mary's	Athlone
Creeve	442	Moycashel	Ardnurcher or Horseleap	Mullingar
Creeve	980	Clonlonan	Ballyloughloe	Athlone
Creevebeg	60	Clonlonan	Ballyloughloe	Athlone
Creevenmanagh	289	Kilkenny West	Kilkenny West	Athlone
Creggan	251	Kilkenny West	Noughaval	Athlone
Creggan Lower	161	Brawny	St. Mary's	Athlone
Creggan Upper	247	Brawny	St. Mary's	Athlone
Cregganmacar	104	Clonlonan	Kilcleagh	Athlone
Creggstown	208	Farbill	Killucan	Mullingar
Creggy	370	Kilkenny West	Noughaval	Ballymahon
Crissaun	159	Rathconrath	Churchtown	Mullingar
Cross	40	Moygoish	Rathaspick	Mullingar
Crossanstown	329	Farbill	Killucan	Mullingar
Crosserdree	258	Moyashel and Magheradernon	Rathconnell	Mullingar
Crosswood	306	Brawny	St. Mary's	Athlone
Croughal	666	Rathconrath	Churchtown	Mullingar
Crowinstown Great	721	Delvin	Castletowndelvin	Castletowndelvin
Crowinstown Little	180	Delvin	Castletowndelvin	Castletowndelvin
Crumlin (or Rockfield)	297	Moygoish	Rathaspick	Mullingar
Culleen Beg	809	Moyashel and Magheradernon	Mullingar	Mullingar
Culleen More	835	Moyashel and Magheradernon	Mullingar	Mullingar
Culleenabohoge	287	Corkaree	Leny	Mullingar
Culleenagower	177	Clonlonan	Kilmanaghan	Athlone
Culleendarragh	210	Corkaree	Leny	Mullingar
Cullenhugh	389	Corkaree	Leny	Mullingar
Culvin	395	Moygoish	Street	Granard
Cummerstown	1,192	Fore	St. Mary's	Castletowndelvin
Cummingstown (or Westmeathmount)	451	Fartullagh	Enniscoffey	Mullingar
Cumminstown	382	Moycashel	Newtown	Mullingar
Cumminstown	428	Moygoish	Kilbixy	Mullingar
Curragh (or Mechum)	7	Brawny	St. Mary's	Athlone
Curragh	451	Moycashel	Kilcumreragh	Athlone
Curragh	63	Brawny	St. Mary's	Athlone
Curraghbane	78	Kilkenny West	Drumraney	Ballymahon
Curraghbeg	41	Clonlonan	Kilcleagh	Athlone
Curraghboy	264	Rathconrath	Piercetown	Mullingar
Curraghboy	88	Fore	Rathgarve	Castletowndelvin
Curraghbrack	123	Moyashel and Magheradernon	Rathconnell	Mullingar
Curraghmore	399	Moyashel and Magheradernon	Rathconnell	Mullingar
Curraghroodle	46	Kilkenny West	Drumraney	Ballymahon
Curries	204	Clonlonan	Kilcleagh	Athlone
Curristeen	267	Moygoish	Rathaspick	Mullingar
Curristown (or Bellmount)	195	Moyashel and Magheradernon	Mullingar	Mullingar
Curristown	191	Farbill	Killucan	Mullingar
Curry	550	Fore	Lickbla	Granard
Cushinstown	376	Farbill	Killucan	Mullingar
Custorum	39	Moycashel	Kilcumreragh	Athlone
Dalystown	354	Rathconrath	Ballymorin	Mullingar
Dalystown	878	Fartullagh	Clonfad	Mullingar
Dardistown	406	Delvin	Killagh	Castletowndelvin
Davidstown (or Guilford)	179	Fartullagh	Clonfad	Mullingar
Davidstown	572	Rathconrath	Rathconrath	Mullingar
Deerpark	109	Moygoish	Kilmacnevan	Mullingar
Deerpark	13	Fore	Rathgarve	Castletowndelvin
Deerpark	220	Fore	St. Feighins	Castletowndelvin
Deerpark	70	Kilkenny West	Kilkenny West	Athlone
Demesne (or Mearsparkfarm)	238	Moycashel	Kilbeggan	Tullamore
Derradd	288	Moygoish	Street	Granard
Derries	220	Brawny	St. Mary's	Athlone
Derries and Ballymacahil	428	Delvin	Kilcumny	Castletowndelvin
Derry	243	Fartullagh	Castlelost	Mullingar
Derrya	592	Fore	Mayne	Granard
Derryboy	251	Farbill	Killucan	Mullingar
Derrycrave	748	Fore	Lickbla	Granard
Derrydooan Lower	447	Moygoish	Rathaspick	Granard
Derrydooan Middle	299	Moygoish	Rathaspick	Granard
Derrydooan Upper	155	Moygoish	Rathaspick	Granard
Derrygolan	378	Moycashel	Durrow	Tullamore
Derryhall	225	Moycashel	Kilcumreragh	Athlone
Derrymacegan (or Westmeathisland)	224	Fore	Foyran	Granard
Derrymore	886	Farbill	Killucan	Mullingar
Derrynagarragh	1,163	Fore	Faughalstown	Castletowndelvin
Derryroe and Benalbit (or Benalbit)	407	Moycashel	Castletownkindalen	Mullingar
Dervotstown	285	Delvin	Killua	Castletowndelvin
Donore	552	Corkaree	Multyfarnham	Mullingar
Donore Demesne	82	Moycashel	Ardnurcher or Horseleap	Mullingar
Doon	302	Fore	Lickbla	Granard
Doonamona	108	Kilkenny West	Noughaval	Ballymahon
Doonis	866	Kilkenny West	Noughaval	Ballymahon
Dooraheen	139	Moycashel	Castletownkindalen	Mullingar
Down	181	Corkaree	Tyfarnham	Mullingar
Downs	175	Corkaree	Taghmon	Mullingar
Drinmore	109	Moyashel and Magheradernon	Rathconnell	Mullingar
Dromore	196	Moycashel	Castletownkindalen	Mullingar
**Drumcree**	Town	Delvin	Kilcumny	Castletowndelvin
Drumcree	314	Delvin	Kilcumny	Castletowndelvin
Drumloose	233	Moyashel and Magheradernon	Mullingar	Mullingar
Drumman	2,606	Fartullagh	Castlelost	Mullingar
Drumman	6	Fartullagh	Pass of Kilbride	Mullingar
Drumman	87	Fore	Rathgarve	Castletowndelvin
Drumraney	631	Kilkenny West	Drumraney	Ballymahon
Dryderstown	234	Delvin	Killulagh	Castletowndelvin
Dunamon	180	Moygoish	Street	Granard
Dunboden Demesne	148	Fartullagh	Moylisker	Mullingar
Dundonnell	411	Rathconrath	Churchtown	Mullingar
Duneel	433	Rathconrath	Killare	Ballymahon
Dunegan	197	Clonlonan	Ballyloughloe	Athlone
Dungaghy	207	Rathconrath	Killare	Mullingar
Dunganstown	205	Delvin	Castletowndelvin	Castletowndelvin
Dunganstown	81	Delvin	Castletowndelvin	Castletowndelvin
Dungolman	110	Rathconrath	Ballymore	Ballymahon
Dunlom East	137	Clonlonan	Ballyloughloe	Athlone
Dunlom West	112	Clonlonan	Ballyloughloe	Athlone
Dunnamona	450	Kilkenny West	Drumraney	Ballymahon
Dysart	167	Delvin	Killulagh	Castletowndelvin
Dysart	1,827	Moyashel and Magheradernon	Dysart	Mullingar
Earlsmeadow (or Lisclogher Little)	199	Delvin	Castletowndelvin	Castletowndelvin
Edmondstown	197	Moyashel and Magheradernon	Rathconnell	Mullingar
Edmondstown	524	Farbill	Killucan	Mullingar
Ellenstown	58	Delvin	Castletowndelvin	Castletowndelvin
Emper	1,625	Moygoish	Kilmacnevan	Mullingar
Enniscoffey (or Caran)	1,421	Fartullagh	Enniscoffey	Mullingar
Fairfield	403	Kilkenny West	Drumraney	Athlone
Fardrum	178	Clonlonan	Kilcleagh	Athlone
Farhtingstown	1,804	Fartullagh	Castlelost	Mullingar
Farhtingstown	281	Rathconrath	Rathconrath	Mullingar
Farnagh	269	Clonlonan	Kilcleagh	Athlone
Farrancallin	227	Corkaree	Taghmon	Mullingar
Farranfolliot	136	Moyashel and Magheradernon	Mullingar	Mullingar
Farranistick	87	Moyashel and Magheradernon	Mullingar	Mullingar
Farranmanny North	20	Clonlonan	Kilcleagh	Athlone
Farranmanny South	18	Clonlonan	Kilcleagh	Athlone
Farrannamoreen	379	Kilkenny West	Kilkenny West	Athlone
Farranshock (or Rathgowan)	85	Moyashel and Magheradernon	Mullingar	Mullingar
Farrow	365	Corkaree	Leny	Mullingar
Fassagh	204	Clonlonan	Ballyloughloe	Athlone
Faughalstown	995	Fore	Faughalstown	Castletowndelvin
Fearbranagh (or Multyfarnham)	116	Corkaree	Tyfarnham	Mullingar
Fearbranagh (or Multyfarnham)	142	Corkaree	Stonehall	Mullingar
Fearmore	137	Clonlonan	Kilcleagh	Athlone
Fearmore	151	Fartullagh	Kilbride	Mullingar
Fearmore	158	Kilkenny West	Drumraney	Athlone
Fearmore	311	Moygoish	Street	Granard
Fearmore	78	Fore	Mayne	Granard
Fearmore	83	Kilkenny West	Drumraney	Athlone
Fennor	683	Moyashel and Magheradernon	Rathconnell	Mullingar
**Finnea**	Town	Fore	Foyran	Granard
Finnea	495	Fore	Foyran	Granard
Fiveacres	70	Rathconrath	Piercetown	Ballymahon
Fore	135	Fore	St. Feighins	Castletowndelvin
Fortyacres	45	Kilkenny West	Kilkenny West	Athlone
Foxburrow	63	Corkaree	Taghmon	Mullingar
Foyran	272	Fore	Foyran	Granard
Freaghmore	371	Fore	Rathgarve	Castletowndelvin
Frevanagh	309	Moycashel	Durrow	Tullamore
Friars Island	112	Brawny	St. Mary's	Athlone
Friarstown	459	Fartullagh	Clonfad	Mullingar
Froghanstown	100	Corkaree	Multyfarnham	Mullingar
Froghanstown	162	Fore	Faughalstown	Castletowndelvin
Fulmort	365	Corkaree	Lackan	Mullingar
Gaddaghanstown	176	Fartullagh	Clonfad	Mullingar
Gaddaghanstown	91	Fartullagh	Carrick	Mullingar
Gaddrystown	290	Moygoish	Templeoran	Mullingar
Gainestown	171	Fartullagh	Lynn	Mullingar
Gallowstown (or Ballynacroghy)	358	Moygoish	Kilbixy	Mullingar
Gallstown	243	Fartullagh	Castlelost	Mullingar
Gallstown	643	Fartullagh	Pass of Kilbride	Mullingar
Galmoylestown Lower	254	Corkaree	Stonehall	Mullingar
Galmoylestown Upper	387	Corkaree	Stonehall	Mullingar
Garhy	655	Moycashel	Castletownkindalen	Mullingar
Garnagh Island	6	Kilkenny West	Bunown	Athlone
Garrane	120	Fartullagh	Castlelost	Mullingar
Garrankesh	37	Brawny	St. Marys	Athlone
Garraree	79	Corkaree	Tyfarnham	Mullingar
Garriskil	431	Moygoish	Street	Granard
Garrycastle	252	Brawny	St. Mary's	Athlone
Garryduff	290	Moycashel	Newtown	Mullingar
Garryduff	338	Moycashel	Rahugh	Mullingar
Garrynafela	145	Brawny	St. Mary's	Athlone
Garrysallagh	238	Corkaree	Stonehall	Mullingar
Gartlandstown	1,005	Fore	Faughalstown	Castletowndelvin
Gawny	31	Moycashel	Ardnurcher or Horseleap	Mullingar
Gaybrook Demesne	845	Fartullagh	Enniscoffey	Mullingar
Gibbonstown	448	Fartullagh	Kilbride	Mullingar
Gibstown	93	Rathconrath	Killare	Mullingar
Gigginstown	568	Delvin	Killulagh	Castletowndelvin
Gilbertstown	186	Fore	Lickbla	Castletowndelvin
Gillardstown	933	Fore	St. Feighins	Castletowndelvin
Glackstown	658	Delvin	Killulagh	Castletowndelvin
Glascarn	863	Moyashel and Magheradernon	Mullingar	Mullingar
**Glassan**	Town	Kilkenny West	Kilkenny West	Athlone
Glassan	149	Kilkenny West	Bunown	Athlone
Glassan	47	Kilkenny West	Kilkenny West	Athlone
Glebe	18	Rathconrath	Piercetown	Ballymahon
Glebe	30	Kilkenny West	Bunown	Athlone
Glebe	35	Corkaree	Leny	Mullingar
Glebe	55	Clonlonan	Ballyloughloe	Athlone
Glebe	65	Corkaree	Taghmon	Mullingar
Glebe	68	Farbill	Killucan	Mullingar
Glebe	69	Rathconrath	Ballymore	Ballymahon
Glebe East	36	Clonlonan	Kilcleagh	Athlone
Glebe West	59	Clonlonan	Kilcleagh	Athlone
Glen	61	Fore	Rathgarve	Castletowndelvin
Glen	706	Clonlonan	Ballyloughloe	Athlone
Glendevine	152	Fartullagh	Lynn	Mullingar
Glengorm	169	Moycashel	Castletownkindalen	Mullingar
Glenidan	1,139	Fore	St. Mary's	Castletowndelvin
Glomerstown	198	Rathconrath	Churchtown	Mullingar
Gneevebane	327	Fartullagh	Castlelost	Mullingar
Gneevebeg	301	Moycashel	Castletownkindalen	Mullingar
Gneevebrack	111	Moycashel	Castletownkindalen	Mullingar
Gneevekeel	72	Moycashel	Ardnurcher or Horseleap	Mullingar
Gneevestown	74	Rathconrath	Conry	Mullingar
Goldenisland (Kilmaine)	72	Brawny	St. Mary's	Athlone
Goldenisland (or St. George)	21	Brawny	St. Mary's	Athlone
Goldenisland	157	Brawny	St. Mary's	Athlone
Gormanstown	95	Delvin	Kilcumny	Castletowndelvin
Gortanear	234	Moygoish	Street	Granard
Gorteen	585	Fartullagh	Lynn	Mullingar
Gorteen	76	Clonlonan	Kilcleagh	Athlone
Gortmore	487	Kilkenny West	Noughaval	Ballymahon
Gortumly	618	Fartullagh	Castlelost	Mullingar
Graffanstown	223	Delvin	Killagh	Castletowndelvin
Grange	191	Moycashel	Kilcumreragh	Athlone
Grange	208	Corkaree	Lackan	Mullingar
Grange	330	Moygoish	Kilbixy	Mullingar
Grange and Kiltober	296	Moycashel	Kilbeggan	Tullamore
Grange Beg	667	Farbill	Killucan	Castletowndelvin
Grange More	2,154	Farbill	Killucan	Castletowndelvin
Grange North	99	Moyashel and Magheradernon	Mullingar	Mullingar
Grange South	177	Moyashel and Magheradernon	Mullingar	Mullingar
Grangegeeth	150	Corkaree	Portloman	Mullingar
Grangegibbon	141	Moycashel	Kilbeggan	Tullamore
Grangestown	113	Delvin	Castletowndelvin	Castletowndelvin
Grangestown	142	Fore	Faughalstown	Castletowndelvin
Grangestown	68	Delvin	Kilcumny	Castletowndelvin
Greatdown	633	Farbill	Killucan	Mullingar
Greenan	318	Moycashel	Kilbeggan	Tullamore
Greenan	4	Delvin	Killucan	Castletowndelvin
Grehanstown	282	Farbill	Killucan	Mullingar
Griffinstown	1,676	Farbill	Killucan	Mullingar
Grouselodge (or Coolatoor)	122	Moycashel	Kilcumreragh	Athlone
Guigginstown	235	Moycashel	Kilbeggan	Tullamore
Guilford (or Davidstown)	179	Fartullagh	Clonfad	Mullingar
Habsborough	216	Moyashel and Magheradernon	Mullingar	Mullingar
Hall	1,113	Clonlonan	Kilcleagh	Athlone
Hallsfarm	189	Moycashel	Kilbeggan	Tullamore
Hammondstown and Tonaghmore	546	Fore	St. Feighins	Castletowndelvin
Hanstown	361	Moyashel and Magheradernon	Mullingar	Mullingar
Hareisland	110	Kilkenny West	Bunown	Athlone
Harrystown	168	Rathconrath	Ballymore	Ballymahon
Heathland	257	Corkaree	Lackan	Mullingar
Heathstown	508	Delvin	Killua	Castletowndelvin
Heathstown	864	Farbill	Killucan	Mullingar
Henfield	43	Moygoish	Rathaspick	Mullingar
Higginstown	247	Fartullagh	Carrick	Mullingar
Higginstown	309	Farbill	Killucan	Mullingar
Higginstown	693	Moycashel	Newtown	Mullingar
Hightown (or Balloughter)	1,283	Farbill	Killucan	Mullingar
Hillquarter	392	Brawny	St. Mary's	Athlone
Hilltown	682	Fore	St. Feighins	Castletowndelvin
Hiskinstown	305	Delvin	Killulagh	Castletowndelvin
Hodgestown	272	Farbill	Killucan	Mullingar
Hopestown	330	Moyashel and Magheradernon	Mullingar	Mullingar
Hospitalbank	67	Moygoish	Street	Granard
Huntingdon	135	Farbill	Killucan	Mullingar
Hydepark	701	Farbill	Killucan	Mullingar
Inchbofin	65	Kilkenny West	Noughaval	Athlone
Inchmore (Tiernan)	65	Kilkenny West	Bunown	Athlone
Inchmore	132	Kilkenny West	Bunown	Athlone
Inchturk	50	Kilkenny West	Noughaval	Athlone
Irishtown	767	Rathconrath	Rathconrath	Mullingar
Irishtown	785	Moyashel and Magheradernon	Mullingar	Mullingar
Jamestown	189	Rathconrath	Churchtown	Mullingar
Jamestown	610	Rathconrath	Conry	Mullingar
Jeffrystown	327	Moyashel and Magheradernon	Rathconnell	Mullingar
Joanstown	1,386	Moygoish	Rathaspick	Mullingar
Johnstown (Nugent) (or Monroe)	113	Moygoish	Templeoran	Mullingar
Johnstown	426	Delvin	Kilcumny	Castletowndelvin
Johnstown	458	Delvin	Killulagh	Castletowndelvin
Johnstown	936	Moygoish	Templeoran	Mullingar
Jordanstown	95	Rathconrath	Rathconrath	Ballymahon
Joristown Lower	289	Farbill	Killucan	Mullingar
Joristown Upper	267	Farbill	Killucan	Mullingar
Keelbeg	118	Moycashel	Castletownkindalen	Mullingar
Keeloge	142	Moycashel	Durrow	Tullamore
Keenoge	89	Rathconrath	Killare	Ballymahon
Kellybrook	111	Rathconrath	Conry	Mullingar
Keoltown	494	Moyashel and Magheradernon	Mullingar	Mullingar
Kerinstown & Balrowan (Rowley)	747	Farbill	Killucan	Mullingar
Kilbalraherd	231	Moycashel	Castletownkindalen	Mullingar
Kilbeg	603	Moycashel	Ardnurcher or Horseleap	Tullamore
**Kilbeggan**	Town	Moycashel	Kilbeggan	Tullamore
Kilbeggan	306	Moycashel	Kilbeggan	Tullamore
Kilbeggan North	84	Moycashel	Kilbeggan	Tullamore
Kilbeggan South	196	Moycashel	Kilbeggan	Tullamore
Kilbillaghan	246	Clonlonan	Kilcleagh	Athlone
Kilbixy	67	Moygoish	Kilbixy	Mullingar
Kilbrennan	620	Fartullagh	Castlelost	Mullingar
Kilbride	470	Fartullagh	Kilbride	Mullingar
Kilcatherina	229	Clonlonan	Kilcumreragh	Athlone
Kilcleagh	385	Clonlonan	Kilcleagh	Athlone
Kilcloghan	191	Moycashel	Newtown	Mullingar
Kilcornan	21	Kilkenny West	Drumraney	Ballymahon
Kilcornan	404	Kilkenny West	Noughaval	Ballymahon
Kilcumny	271	Delvin	Kilcumny	Castletowndelvin
Kilcumreragh	478	Moycashel	Kilcumreragh	Athlone
Kildallan, Westmeath	248	Moygoish	Templeoran	Mullingar
Kildallan North	257	Moygoish	Templeoran	Mullingar
Kilfaughny	145	Kilkenny West	Kilkenny West	Athlone
Kilgar	475	Delvin	Castletowndelvin	Castletowndelvin
Kilgaroan	345	Moycashel	Ardnurcher or Horseleap	Tullamore
Kilgarvan	228	Clonlonan	Kilcleagh	Athlone
Kilgarvan Glebe	1,363	Clonlonan	Kilcleagh	Athlone
Kilgawny	533	Rathconrath	Piercetown	Mullingar
Kilhugh	404	Moycashel	Castletownkindalen	Mullingar
Kilkenny Abbey	279	Kilkenny West	Kilkenny West	Athlone
Kilkenny Lanesborough	122	Kilkenny West	Kilkenny West	Athlone
Kilkenny West	485	Kilkenny West	Kilkenny West	Athlone
Kill	175	Clonlonan	Kilcleagh	Athlone
Kill	222	Moygoish	Kilbixy	Mullingar
Killachonna (Castlemaine)	77	Clonlonan	Ballyloughloe	Athlone
Killachonna (Clibborn)	142	Clonlonan	Ballyloughloe	Athlone
Killachonna (Potts)	10	Clonlonan	Ballyloughloe	Athlone
Killadoughran	420	Delvin	Castletowndelvin	Castletowndelvin
Killagh	851	Delvin	Killagh	Castletowndelvin
Killahugh	279	Rathconrath	Rathconrath	Mullingar
Killalea	20	Moycashel	Castletownkindalen	Mullingar
Killard	263	Moycashel	Ardnurcher or Horseleap	Mullingar
Killarecastle	508	Rathconrath	Killare	Mullingar
Killarechurch	258	Rathconrath	Killare	Mullingar
Killaroo	195	Rathconrath	Killare	Mullingar
**Killavally**	Town	Moycashel	Newtown	Mullingar
Killavally	817	Moycashel	Newtown	Mullingar
Killeagh	120	Moycashel	Ardnurcher or Horseleap	Mullingar
Killeen	170	Moycashel	Castletownkindalen	Mullingar
Killeenagh	92	Rathconrath	Killare	Mullingar
Killeenagroagh	43	Rathconrath	Killare	Mullingar
Killeenatoor	193	Clonlonan	Ballyloughloe	Athlone
Killeenbane (or Tullagh Upper)	55	Rathconrath	Killare	Mullingar
Killeenboy	271	Rathconrath	Killare	Ballymahon
Killeenboylegan	180	Clonlonan	Kilmanaghan	Athlone
Killeenbrack	746	Rathconrath	Killare	Mullingar
Killeenerk	255	Rathconrath	Ballymorin	Mullingar
Killeenmore	419	Kilkenny West	Bunown	Athlone
Killeennanam	117	Kilkenny West	Drumraney	Ballymahon
Killeenycallaghan	109	Moycashel	Ardnurcher or Horseleap	Mullingar
Killinagh	728	Moygoish	Rathaspick	Mullingar
Killininneen	275	Kilkenny West	Drumraney	Ballymahon
Killinlahan	375	Moycashel	Castletownkindalen	Mullingar
Killinroan	142	Clonlonan	Ballyloughloe	Athlone
Killintown	232	Corkaree	Stonehall	Mullingar
Killinure North	753	Kilkenny West	Bunown	Athlone
Killinure South	115	Kilkenny West	Bunown	Athlone
Killogeenaghan	566	Clonlonan	Kilcleagh	Athlone
Killomenaghan	62	Clonlonan	Kilcleagh	Athlone
Killua	935	Delvin	Killua	Castletowndelvin
**Killucan**	Town	Farbill	Killucan	Mullingar
Killucan	356	Farbill	Killucan	Mullingar
Killulagh	131	Delvin	Killulagh	Castletowndelvin
Killynan (Cooke)	1,090	Moyashel and Magheradernon	Rathconnell	Mullingar
Killynan (Pratt)	1,181	Moyashel and Magheradernon	Rathconnell	Mullingar
Kilmacahill (or Caraun)	408	Moygoish	Rathaspick	Mullingar
Kilmacnevan	240	Moygoish	Kilmacnevan	Mullingar
Kilmacuagh (Castlemaine)	39	Brawny	St. Mary's	Athlone
Kilmacuagh (Cooke)	50	Brawny	St. Mary's	Athlone
Kilmacuagh (Mechum)	56	Brawny	St. Mary's	Athlone
Kilmaglish	517	Corkaree	Tyfarnham	Mullingar
Kilmore	630	Moygoish	Street	Granard
Kilnafaddoge	26	Brawny	St. Mary's	Athlone
Kilnagallagh	40	Moycashel	Ardnurcher or Horseleap	Mullingar
Kilnahinch	300	Clonlonan	Kilmanaghan	Athlone
Kilnalug	107	Moycashel	Ardnurcher or Horseleap	Mullingar
Kilpatrick	132	Moycashel	Ardnurcher or Horseleap	Mullingar
Kilpatrick	297	Rathconrath	Rathconrath	Mullingar
Kilpatrick	472	Corkaree	Leny	Mullingar
Kilpatrick	772	Moyashel and Magheradernon	Mullingar	Mullingar
Kilpatrick	843	Fore	Kilpatrick	Castletowndelvin
Kilphierish	269	Rathconrath	Piercetown	Ballymahon
Kilrush Lower	478	Delvin	Killua	Castletowndelvin
Kilrush Upper	444	Delvin	Killua	Castletowndelvin
Kilshallow	122	Moygoish	Street	Granard
Kiltareher	172	Moygoish	Street	Granard
Kiltober	380	Moycashel	Rahugh	Tullamore
Kiltober	58	Kilkenny West	Drumraney	Ballymahon
Kiltober and Grange	296	Moycashel	Kilbeggan	Tullamore
Kiltoom	536	Fore	Faughalstown	Granard
Kiltotan and Collinstown	328	Fartullagh	Castlelost	Mullingar
Kilwalter	84	Delvin	Kilcumny	Castletowndelvin
Knightswood	465	Corkaree	Leny	Mullingar
**Kinnegad**	Town	Farbill	Killucan	Mullingar
Kinnegad	1,358	Farbill	Killucan	Mullingar
Kinturk Demesne	818	Fore	Rathgarve	Castletowndelvin
Kippin	103	Kilkenny West	Noughaval	Ballymahon
Kippinduff	273	Moycashel	Castletownkindalen	Mullingar
Kippinstown	60	Brawny	St. Mary's	Athlone
Knock Killua	306	Delvin	Killua	Castletowndelvin
Knockacurra	140	Moycashel	Castletownkindalen	Mullingar
Knockanea	210	Clonlonan	Kilcleagh	Athlone
Knockatee	289	Corkaree	Taghmon	Mullingar
Knockatee	7	Corkaree	Tyfarnham	Mullingar
Knockaville	809	Farbill	Killucan	Mullingar
Knockbody	336	Corkaree	Stonehall	Mullingar
Knockdomny	687	Clonlonan	Ballyloughloe	Athlone
Knockdrin	58	Corkaree	Tyfarnham	Mullingar
Knockdrin	71	Corkaree	Taghmon	Mullingar
Knockdrin	920	Moyashel and Magheradernon	Rathconnell	Mullingar
Knockdrin Demesne	68	Moyashel and Magheradernon	Mullingar	Mullingar
Knockmant	602	Farbill	Killucan	Mullingar
Knockmore	403	Moycashel	Newtown	Mullingar
Knockmorris	38	Corkaree	Lackan	Mullingar
Knockroe	36	Fore	Rathgarve	Granard
Knocksimon	132	Farbill	Killucan	Mullingar
Knockycosker	440	Moycashel	Newtown	Mullingar
Labaun	288	Clonlonan	Ballyloughloe	Athlone
Lackan	163	Kilkenny West	Kilkenny West	Athlone
Lackan	768	Corkaree	Lackan	Mullingar
Lackanwood	306	Corkaree	Lackan	Mullingar
Ladestown	401	Moyashel and Magheradernon	Mullingar	Mullingar
Ladestown	401	Moyashel and Magheradernon	Mullingar	Mullingar
Lakill and Moortown	837	Fore	St. Feighins	Castletowndelvin
Lakingstown	268	Moygoish	Kilmacnevan	Mullingar
Lalistown	349	Rathconrath	Conry	Mullingar
Laragh	147	Moygoish	Kilmacnevan	Mullingar
Laragh	627	Moycashel	Kilcumreragh	Athlone
Larkinstown	220	Corkaree	Stonehall	Mullingar
Lecade	95	Kilkenny West	Noughaval	Ballymahon
Legan	121	Clonlonan	Kilmanaghan	Athlone
Legan	87	Clonlonan	Ballyloughloe	Athlone
Lemongrove (or Rathcam)	263	Fartullagh	Enniscoffey	Mullingar
Lenamore	49	Rathconrath	Ballymorin	Mullingar
Leny	163	Corkaree	Leny	Mullingar
Leny	294	Corkaree	Lackan	Mullingar
Lickbla	397	Fore	Lickbla	Granard
Lickny	52	Fore	Mayne	Granard
Lilliput (or Nure)	244	Moycashel	Dysart	Mullingar
Lisclogher Great	1,565	Delvin	Castletowndelvin	Castletowndelvin
Lisclogher Little (or Earlsmeadow)	199	Delvin	Castletowndelvin	Castletowndelvin
Lisdachon	282	Kilkenny West	Kilkenny West	Athlone
Lisdossan	455	Kilkenny West	Noughaval	Ballymahon
Lisduff	142	Moygoish	Street	Granard
Lismacaffry	110	Moygoish	Street	Granard
Lismalady	174	Corkaree	Multyfarnham	Mullingar
Lismoyny	214	Moycashel	Ardnurcher or Horseleap	Tullamore
Lisnabin	276	Farbill	Killucan	Mullingar
Lisnacask	167	Rathconrath	Rathconrath	Mullingar
Lisnagappagh	71	Moygoish	Street	Granard
Lisnagree	403	Moycashel	Kilcumreragh	Athlone
Lisnascreen	143	Kilkenny West	Kilkenny West	Athlone
Lisnugent	62	Fore	Foyran	Granard
Lispopple	238	Fore	Mayne	Granard
Lissakillen North	131	Kilkenny West	Bunown	Athlone
Lissakillen South	180	Kilkenny West	Bunown	Athlone
Lissakilly	191	Moycashel	Castletownkindalen	Mullingar
Lissanode	592	Kilkenny West	Drumraney	Athlone
Lissaquill	114	Kilkenny West	Noughaval	Ballymahon
Lissatunny	142	Kilkenny West	Kilkenny West	Athlone
Lissavra Big	177	Moycashel	Ardnurcher or Horseleap	Mullingar
Lissavra Big	52	Moycashel	Ardnurcher or Horseleap	Mullingar
Lissoy	254	Kilkenny West	Kilkenny West	Athlone
Lissoy	45	Kilkenny West	Noughaval	Athlone
Lissywollen	196	Brawny	St. Marys	Athlone
Littletown	256	Kilkenny West	Kilkenny West	Ballymahon
Littlewood	203	Fore	Lickbla	Granard
Lockardstown	204	Rathconrath	Conry	Mullingar
Loughagar Beg	108	Moyashel and Magheradernon	Rathconnell	Mullingar
Loughagar More	906	Moyashel and Magheradernon	Rathconnell	Mullingar
Loughan	347	Rathconrath	Rathconrath	Mullingar
Loughanagore	313	Moycashel	Kilbeggan	Tullamore
Loughanalla	129	Fore	Rathgarve	Castletowndelvin
Loughanaskin	31	Brawny	St. Mary's	Athlone
Loughanavagh (or Newpark)	172	Fore	St. Feighins	Castletowndelvin
Loughandonning	183	Brawny	St. Mary's	Athlone
Loughanlewnaght	144	Moycashel	Newtown	Mullingar
Loughanstown	134	Fore	Rathgarve	Granard
Loughanstown	155	Moygoish	Russagh	Granard
Loughanstown	275	Delvin	Castletowndelvin	Castletowndelvin
Loughanstown	357	Corkaree	Portnashangan	Mullingar
Loughanstown Lower (or Slievelahan)	145	Moygoish	Russagh	Granard
Loughpark	171	Fore	St. Feighins	Castletowndelvin
Loughstown	89	Delvin	Kilcumny	Castletowndelvin
Lowertown	300	Moycashel	Rahugh	Tullamore
Lowerwood	233	Clonlonan	Kilcleagh	Athlone
Lowpark (or Ballyboy)	262	Kilkenny West	Kilkenny West	Athlone
Lowtown (or Balleighter)	395	Farbill	Killucan	Mullingar
Lugacaha	175	Rathconrath	Ballymore	Ballymahon
Luggygalla	82	Rathconrath	Rathconrath	Mullingar
Lugnagullagh	70	Corkaree	Tyfarnham	Mullingar
Lunestown	177	Farbill	Killucan	Castletowndelvin
Lurgan	108	Rathconrath	Killare	Mullingar
Lurgan	57	Kilkenny West	Kilkenny West	Athlone
Lurrig	108	Moycashel	Castletownkindalen	Mullingar
Lynn	1,204	Fartullagh	Lynn	Mullingar
Mabestown	316	Delvin	Castletowndelvin	Castletowndelvin
Mabrista	125	Moycashel	Castletownkindalen	Mullingar
Mace	201	Moygoish	Rathaspick	Mullingar
Macetown	985	Moyashel and Magheradernon	Rathconnell	Mullingar
Mackanranny	131	Clonlonan	Ballyloughloe	Athlone
Maddadoo	160	Rathconrath	Killare	Ballymahon
Maghera	403	Kilkenny West	Noughaval	Ballymahon
Magheracuirknagh	3	Kilkenny West	Kilkenny West	Athlone
Magheramore	269	Clonlonan	Ballyloughloe	Athlone
Magheramurry	135	Clonlonan	Kilmanaghan	Athlone
Magheranerla	12	Brawny	St. Mary's	Athlone
Mahonstown	507	Fartullagh	Enniscoffey	Mullingar
Malthousepark	8	Rathconrath	Piercetown	Ballymahon
Marlinstown	673	Moyashel and Magheradernon	Mullingar	Mullingar
Marlinstown Bog	117	Moyashel and Magheradernon	Mullingar	Mullingar
Martinstown	33	Fore	Lickbla	Castletowndelvin
Martinstown	376	Delvin	Castletowndelvin	Castletowndelvin
Martinstown	532	Corkaree	Stonehall	Mullingar
Martinstown	592	Fore	St. Mary's	Castletowndelvin
Mayne	540	Fore	Mayne	Granard
Meadowpark	63	Moycashel	Kilbeggan	Tullamore
Meedin	460	Fartullagh	Clonfad	Mullingar
Meehan	267	Brawny	St. Mary's	Athlone
Meeldrum	131	Moycashel	Kilbeggan	Tullamore
Meeniska	58	Moycashel	Kilbeggan	Tullamore
Meersparkfarm (or Demesne)	238	Moycashel	Kilbeggan	Tullamore
Milkernagh	376	Moygoish	Street	Granard
Mill Land	37	Farbill	Killucan	Mullingar
Millcastle	228	Fore	Rathgarve	Castletowndelvin
Millerstown	72	Farbill	Killucan	Mullingar
Milltown	701	Rathconrath	Churchtown	Mullingar
**Milltown**	Town	Fartullagh	Pass of Kilbride	Mullingar
Milltown	1,115	Fartullagh	Pass of Kilbride	Mullingar
Milltown	195	Rathconrath	Ballymore	Ballymahon
Milltown	310	Rathconrath	Rathconrath	Mullingar
Milltown	775	Fore	Faughalstown	Castletowndelvin
Mitchelstown	298	Delvin	Castletowndelvin	Castletowndelvin
**Moate**	Town	Clonlonan	Kilcleagh	Athlone
**Moate**	Town	Clonlonan	Kilmanaghan	Athlone
Moategranoge	374	Clonlonan	Kilcleagh	Athlone
Modranstown	122	Rathconrath	Rathconrath	Mullingar
Monaduff	170	Moycashel	Ardnurcher or Horseleap	Mullingar
Monagead	164	Moygoish	Street	Granard
Monaghanstown	787	Moycashel	Dysart	Mullingar
Monasset	912	Moycashel	Rahugh	Tullamore
Moneen	191	Clonlonan	Kilcleagh	Athlone
Money	268	Fore	Foyran	Granard
Moneybeg	261	Fore	Foyran	Granard
Moneylea	3	Moyashel and Magheradernon	Rathconnell	Mullingar
Moneynamanagh (or Umma Beg)	207	Rathconrath	Ballymore	Athlone
Monganstown	483	Farbill	Killucan	Mullingar
Monintown	116	Corkaree	Stonehall	Mullingar
Monintown	425	Corkaree	Multyfarnham	Mullingar
Monkstown	589	Corkaree	Taghmon	Mullingar
Monktown	379	Fore	Mayne	Granard
Monroe or Johnstown (Nugent)	113	Moygoish	Templeoran	Mullingar
Monroe	167	Corkaree	Portloman	Mullingar
Montrath	983	Moycashel	Rahugh	Tullamore
Moorerow (or Tonlegee)	297	Fartullagh	Kilbride	Mullingar
Mooretown	400	Delvin	Castletowndelvin	Castletowndelvin
Moortown and Lakill	837	Fore	St. Feighins	Castletowndelvin
Moranspark	8	Rathconrath	Killare	Mullingar
Moranstown	47	Moygoish	Kilbixy	Mullingar
Mosstown (or Ballinkeeny)	212	Rathconrath	Killare	Mullingar
Mosstown Demesne	140	Rathconrath	Killare	Mullingar
Mount Temple	580	Clonlonan	Ballyloughloe	Athlone
Mountmurray	357	Corkaree	Portnashangan	Mullingar
Mountrobert	143	Moyashel and Magheradernon	Rathconnell	Mullingar
Moycashel	680	Moycashel	Ardnurcher or Horseleap	Tullamore
Moydrum	474	Brawny	St. Mary's	Athlone
Moydrum	498	Clonlonan	Ballyloughloe	Athlone
Moygrehan Lower	259	Delvin	Killua	Castletowndelvin
Moygrehan Upper	237	Delvin	Killua	Castletowndelvin
Moyleroe Big	298	Delvin	Castletowndelvin	Castletowndelvin
Moyleroe Little	60	Delvin	Castletowndelvin	Castletowndelvin
**Moyvore**	Town	Rathconrath	Templepatrick	Ballymahon
Moyvore	1,483	Rathconrath	Templepatrick	Ballymahon
Moyvoughly	1,911	Rathconrath	Ballymore	Athlone
Muckanagh	634	Kilkenny West	Noughaval	Athlone
Muckletown	10	Delvin	Castletowndelvin	Castletowndelvin
Mucklin	131	Delvin	Killucan	Castletowndelvin
Mulchanstown	110	Delvin	Killulagh	Castletowndelvin
Mullagh	278	Fore	Lickbla	Granard
Mullaghcloe	633	Rathconrath	Killare	Ballymahon
Mullaghcroy	526	Delvin	Castletowndelvin	Castletowndelvin
Mullaghmeen	436	Fore	Foyran	Granard
Mullanakill	125	Fore	Rathgarve	Castletowndelvin
Mullenmeehan	523	Rathconrath	Ballymore	Ballymahon
Mulliganstown	552	Delvin	Clonarney	Castletowndelvin
**Mullingar**	Town	Moyashel and Magheradernon	Mullingar	Mullingar
Mullingar	857	Moyashel and Magheradernon	Mullingar	Mullingar
**Multyfarnham**	Town	Corkaree	Multyfarnham	Mullingar
Multyfarnham (or Fearbranagh)	116	Corkaree	Tyfarnham	Mullingar
Multyfarnham (or Fearbranagh)	142	Corkaree	Stonehall	Mullingar
Multyfarnham	185	Corkaree	Multyfarnham	Mullingar
Mweelra	91	Rathconrath	Conry	Mullingar
Mylestown	144	Farbill	Killucan	Mullingar
Nahod Little	156	Clonlonan	Ballyloughloe	Athlone
Nahod More	183	Clonlonan	Ballyloughloe	Athlone
Newbristy North	126	Rathconrath	Ballymorin	Mullingar
Newbristy South	55	Rathconrath	Ballymorin	Mullingar
Newcastle	358	Fore	Lickbla	Granard
Newcastle	508	Fartullagh	Clonfad	Mullingar
Newcastle	67	Clonlonan	Kilcleagh	Athlone
Newdown	1,406	Farbill	Killucan	Mullingar
Newgrove	34	Kilkenny West	Drumraney	Ballymahon
Newpark (or Loughanavagh)	172	Fore	St. Feighins	Castletowndelvin
Newpass Demesne	131	Moygoish	Rathaspick	Granard
Newtown	131	Fore	Mayne	Granard
Newtown	181	Moyashel and Magheradernon	Mullingar	Mullingar
Newtown	395	Delvin	Castletowndelvin	Castletowndelvin
Newtown	525	Rathconrath	Ballymore	Ballymahon
Newtownlow	190	Moycashel	Newtown	Mullingar
Nicholastown	163	Rathconrath	Churchtown	Mullingar
Nicholastown	33	Kilkenny West	Noughaval	Ballymahon
Nonsuch	220	Fore	Mayne	Granard
Noughaval	557	Kilkenny West	Noughaval	Ballymahon
Nuns Island	44	Kilkenny West	Bunown	Athlone
Nure (or Lilliput)	244	Moycashel	Dysart	Mullingar
Oldtown (or Puddingstreet)	111	Kilkenny West	Drumraney	Ballymahon
Oldtown	364	Fartullagh	Castlelost	Mullingar
Ories	378	Clonlonan	Kilcleagh	Athlone
Packenhamhall (or Tullynally)	471	Fore	Mayne	Granard
Paddinstown Lower	410	Rathconrath	Rathconrath	Ballymahon
Paddinstown Upper	172	Rathconrath	Rathconrath	Ballymahon
Pallas	303	Moycashel	Durrow	Tullamore
Pallasboy	481	Moycashel	Rahugh	Tullamore
Parcellstown	123	Rathconrath	Rathconrath	Mullingar
Parcellstown	727	Moygoish	Templeoran	Mullingar
Paristown	120	Delvin	Killua	Castletowndelvin
Parsonstown	413	Corkaree	Tyfarnham	Mullingar
Paslicktown	272	Fartullagh	Moylisker	Mullingar
Pass of Kilbride	1,999	Fartullagh	Pass of Kilbride	Mullingar
Pearsonsbrook	208	Kilkenny West	Kilkenny West	Athlone
Petitswood	552	Moyashel and Magheradernon	Mullingar	Mullingar
Piercefield (or Templeoran)	740	Moygoish	Templeoran	Mullingar
Piercefield	255	Corkaree	Portnashangan	Mullingar
Piercetown	233	Rathconrath	Piercetown	Ballymahon
Piercetown	313	Fartullagh	Castlelost	Mullingar
Pishanagh	128	Kilkenny West	Drumraney	Ballymahon
Pishanagh	73	Rathconrath	Rathconrath	Mullingar
Plodstown	167	Moyashel and Magheradernon	Mullingar	Mullingar
Plodstown	52	Fartullagh	Mullingar	Mullingar
Portaneena	219	Kilkenny West	Kilkenny West	Athlone
Porterstown (Cooke)	367	Farbill	Killucan	Mullingar
Porterstown (Napper)	157	Farbill	Killucan	Mullingar
Portjack	123	Fore	Mayne	Granard
Portlick	373	Kilkenny West	Bunown	Athlone
Portloman	267	Corkaree	Portloman	Mullingar
Portnashangan	498	Corkaree	Portnashangan	Mullingar
Pottiaghan Commons	153	Rathconrath	Killare	Ballymahon
Prebaun	40	Fartullagh	Moylisker	Mullingar
Priesttown	224	Farbill	Killucan	Mullingar
Printinstown	323	Delvin	Castletowndelvin	Castletowndelvin
Puddingstreet (or Oldtown)	111	Kilkenny West	Drumraney	Ballymahon
Quarry	201	Moyashel and Magheradernon	Mullingar	Mullingar
Rackavra	501	Rathconrath	Killare	Mullingar
Rahadorrish	153	Rathconrath	Templepatrick	Ballymahon
Rahanine	568	Fartullagh	Castlelost	Mullingar
**Raharney**	Town	Farbill	Killucan	Mullingar
Raharney	243	Farbill	Killucan	Mullingar
Raharney Little	56	Farbill	Killucan	Castletowndelvin
Raheen	682	Rathconrath	Ballymore	Athlone
Raheen Beg	115	Fore	Rathgarve	Granard
Raheen More	132	Fore	Rathgarve	Castletowndelvin
Rahinashene and Spittaltown	141	Moycashel	Newtown	Mullingar
Rahinashurock	96	Moycashel	Newtown	Mullingar
Rahincuill	486	Fartullagh	Newtown	Mullingar
Rahinmore	169	Moycashel	Newtown	Mullingar
Rahugh	271	Moycashel	Rahugh	Tullamore
Ralphsdale	163	Delvin	Kilcumny	Castletowndelvin
Ranaghan	641	Fore	St. Feighins	Castletowndelvin
Ranahiuch	261	Fore	Faughalstown	Castletowndelvin
Rath (Malone)	37	Rathconrath	Piercetown	Mullingar
Rath	112	Moygoish	Kilbixy	Mullingar
Rath	352	Kilkenny West	Kilkenny West	Athlone
Rath	652	Moygoish	Street	Granard
Rath Lower	121	Kilkenny West	Noughaval	Ballymahon
Rath Upper	174	Kilkenny West	Noughaval	Ballymahon
Rathaniska	114	Corkaree	Leny	Mullingar
Rathaniska	6	Corkaree	Lackan	Mullingar
Rathaspick	126	Moygoish	Rathaspick	Mullingar
Rathbennett	333	Corkaree	Leny	Mullingar
Rathbrack	38	Farbill	Killucan	Mullingar
Rathcaled	383	Rathconrath	Rathconrath	Mullingar
Rathcam (or Lemongrove)	263	Fartullagh	Enniscoffey	Mullingar
Rathcarra	34	Rathconrath	Ballymorin	Mullingar
Rathcastle	145	Rathconrath	Rathconrath	Mullingar
Rathclittagh	227	Moygoish	Rathaspick	Mullingar
Rathcogue	188	Rathconrath	Piercetown	Ballymahon
Rathcolman	307	Moyashel and Magheradernon	Mullingar	Mullingar
Rathconnell	575	Moyashel and Magheradernon	Rathconnell	Mullingar
**Rathconrath**	Town	Rathconrath	Rathconrath	Mullingar
Rathconrath	152	Rathconrath	Rathconrath	Mullingar
Rathcorbally	175	Corkaree	Taghmon	Mullingar
Rathcore	163	Rathconrath	Churchtown	Mullingar
Rathcreevagh	437	Fore	Lickbla	Castletowndelvin
Rathdrishoge	382	Moycashel	Castletownkindalen	Mullingar
Rathduff (or Anneville)	335	Fartullagh	Moylisker	Mullingar
Rathduff	148	Clonlonan	Ballyloughloe	Athlone
Rathduff	295	Rathconrath	Rathconrath	Mullingar
Rathganny	498	Corkaree	Multyfarnham	Mullingar
Rathgarrett	2,582	Fartullagh	Newtown	Mullingar
Rathgarve	97	Fore	Rathgarve	Castletowndelvin
Rathgowan (or Farranshock)	85	Moyashel and Magheradernon	Mullingar	Mullingar
Rathlevanagh	256	Corkaree	Portnashangan	Mullingar
Rathmore	204	Moygoish	Kilmacnevan	Mullingar
Rathnamuddagh	1,538	Moyashel and Magheradernon	Dysart	Mullingar
Rathnarrow	107	Farbill	Killucan	Mullingar
Rathnew	92	Rathconrath	Conry	Mullingar
Rathnugent	107	Moycashel	Castletownkindalen	Mullingar
Rathnure	197	Fartullagh	Clonfad	Mullingar
**Rathowen**	Town	Moygoish	Rathaspick	Granard
Rathowen (Edward)	93	Moygoish	Rathaspick	Granard
Rathowen	307	Moygoish	Rathaspick	Granard
Rathowen	59	Moygoish	Russagh	Granard
Rathshane	175	Fore	Foyran	Granard
Rathskeagh Loweer	181	Rathconrath	Killare	Mullingar
Rathskeagh Upper	438	Rathconrath	Killare	Mullingar
Rathtrim	129	Rathconrath	Rathconrath	Mullingar
**Rathwire**	Town	Farbill	Killucan	Mullingar
Rathwire Lower	369	Farbill	Killucan	Mullingar
Rathwire Upper	437	Farbill	Killucan	Mullingar
Ratrass	218	Farbill	Killucan	Castletowndelvin
Rattin	1,528	Farbill	Killucan	Mullingar
Redmondstown	659	Rathconrath	Churchtown	Mullingar
Rehabane	484	Moygoish	Street	Granard
Relick (Longworth)	215	Rathconrath	Piercetown	Ballymahon
Relick (Malone)	36	Rathconrath	Piercetown	Ballymahon
Retreat	89	Brawny	St. Mary's	Athlone
Reynella	611	Moyashel and Magheradernon	Rathconnell	Mullingar
Rickardstown	839	Delvin	Killulagh	Castletowndelvin
Ringstown	235	Fore	Faughalstown	Castletowndelvin
Riverdale	1,695	Farbill	Killucan	Castletowndelvin
Riverstown	457	Farbill	Killucan	Mullingar
Robinstown (Levinge)	306	Moyashel and Magheradernon	Mullingar	Mullingar
Robinstown (Tyrrell)	250	Moyashel and Magheradernon	Mullingar	Mullingar
Robinstown	152	Fore	Lickbla	Castletowndelvin
Robinstown	20	Fartullagh	Clonfad	Mullingar
Robinstown	318	Fartullagh	Carrick	Mullingar
Robinstown	393	Delvin	Kilcumny	Castletowndelvin
Robinstown Great	98	Delvin	Castletowndelvin	Castletowndelvin
Robinstown Little	23	Delvin	Castletowndelvin	Castletowndelvin
Robinstown Lower	98	Fore	Rathgarve	Castletowndelvin
Robinstown Upper	125	Fore	Rathgarve	Castletowndelvin
Rochestown	154	Fore	Lickbla	Granard
Rochfort Demesne	450	Fartullagh	Moylisker	Mullingar
**Rochfortbridge**	Town	Fartullagh	Castlelost	Mullingar
Rockfield (or Crumlin)	297	Moygoish	Rathaspick	Mullingar
Rogerstown	133	Rathconrath	Churchtown	Mullingar
Rooan	86	Kilkenny West	Bunown	Athlone
Rosmead and Cavestown	1,346	Delvin	Castletowndelvin	Castletowndelvin
Ross	93	Kilkenny West	Noughaval	Athlone
Rossbeg	95	Moycashel	Rahugh	Tullamore
Rostalla	272	Moycashel	Durrow	Tullamore
Rowe (or Toordillon)	60	Rathconrath	Killare	Mullingar
Rowlandstown	290	Rathconrath	Rathconrath	Mullingar
Russagh	240	Moygoish	Russagh	Granard
Russellstown	455	Fartullagh	Mullingar	Mullingar
Russellstown Little	37	Fartullagh	Mullingar	Mullingar
Sarsanstown	124	Moyashel and Magheradernon	Mullingar	Mullingar
Sarsfieldstown	76	Farbill	Killucan	Mullingar
Scroghil	54	Clonlonan	Kilcleagh	Athlone
Scurlockstown	151	Corkaree	Portloman	Mullingar
Scurlockstown	575	Delvin	Clonarney	Castletowndelvin
Seeoge	150	Clonlonan	Kilcleagh	Athlone
Shanonagh	533	Moygoish	Templeoran	Mullingar
Sheean	56	Clonlonan	Kilcleagh	Athlone
Sheean	75	Rathconrath	Rathconrath	Ballymahon
Sheefin	295	Corkaree	Taghmon	Mullingar
Sheepstown	385	Delvin	Clonarney	Castletowndelvin
Sheskernagh	104	Fore	Rathgarve	Castletowndelvin
Shinglis	1,581	Rathconrath	Ballymore	Ballymahon
Shrubbywood	280	Fore	Mayne	Granard
Shureen and Ballynasuddery	171	Moycashel	Kilbeggan	Tullamore
Shurock	109	Moycashel	Castletownkindalen	Mullingar
Shurock	257	Clonlonan	Ballyloughloe	Athlone
Simonstown	126	Fartullagh	Kilbride	Mullingar
Simonstown	230	Fartullagh	Enniscoffey	Mullingar
Simonstown	279	Rathconrath	Rathconrath	Mullingar
Simonstown	285	Fore	Mayne	Granard
Simonstown	47	Farbill	Killucan	Mullingar
Sionhill	398	Farbill	Killucan	Mullingar
Skeagh Beg	52	Rathconrath	Rathconrath	Mullingar
Skeagh More	397	Rathconrath	Rathconrath	Mullingar
Skeahanagh	237	Moycashel	Kilbeggan	Tullamore
Skeanaveane	32	Kilkenny West	Bunown	Athlone
Skeheen (Evans)	132	Moycashel	Ardnurcher or Horseleap	Mullingar
Skeheen (Nagle)	229	Moycashel	Ardnurcher or Horseleap	Mullingar
Slane Beg	308	Moyashel and Magheradernon	Dysart	Mullingar
Slane More	408	Moyashel and Magheradernon	Dysart	Mullingar
Slanestown	478	Moyashel and Magheradernon	Mullingar	Mullingar
Slieveboy	491	Fore	Rathgarve	Castletowndelvin
Slievelahan (or Loughanstown Lower)	145	Moygoish	Russagh	Granard
Snimnagorta	265	Rathconrath	Ballymore	Ballymahon
Soho	118	Corkaree	Multyfarnham	Mullingar
Sonnagh	190	Moycashel	Rahugh	Tullamore
Sonnagh Demesne	478	Moygoish	Templeoran	Mullingar
South Hill	174	Delvin	Castletowndelvin	Castletowndelvin
Spittaltown & Rahinashane	141	Moycashel	Newtown	Mullingar
Spittaltown	254	Moycashel	Ardnurcher or Horseleap	Mullingar
Spittlefield (or Springfield)	274	Moyashel and Magheradernon	Mullingar	Mullingar
Springfield (or Spittlefield)	274	Moyashel and Magheradernon	Mullingar	Mullingar
Sraduff	249	Moycashel	Castletownkindalen	Mullingar
Srahenry	7	Moyashel and Magheradernon	Mullingar	Mullingar
Srameen	43	Brawny	St. Mary's	Athlone
Sraneeg	264	Moycashel	Castletownkindalen	Mullingar
Srunahella	212	Fore	Rathgarve	Castletowndelvin
Stokestown	288	Moyashel and Magheradernon	Mullingar	Mullingar
Stonehall	387	Corkaree	Stonehall	Mullingar
Stonehousefarm	125	Moycashel	Kilbeggan	Tullamore
Stonestown	242	Delvin	Castletowndelvin	Castletowndelvin
Stonestown	268	Fore	Rathgarve	Castletowndelvin
Stonestown	521	Delvin	Clonarney	Castletowndelvin
Stonestown	61	Delvin	Killulagh	Castletowndelvin
Stongaluggaun	29	Moygoish	Rathaspick	Mullingar
Strattonstown	375	Moyashel and Magheradernon	Mullingar	Mullingar
Streamstown	110	Kilkenny West	Drumraney	Ballymahon
Streamstown	468	Fore	Faughalstown	Castletowndelvin
Streamstown	69	Kilkenny West	Noughaval	Ballymahon
Streamstown	958	Moycashel	Ardnurcher or Horseleap	Mullingar
Syonan	100	Moycashel	Ardnurcher or Horseleap	Mullingar
Taghboyne	172	Rathconrath	Churchtown	Mullingar
Taghmon	1,120	Corkaree	Taghmon	Mullingar
Taghnafearagh	170	Rathconrath	Killare	Mullingar
Tallyho	69	Fartullagh	Moylisker	Mullingar
Teermore	95	Moycashel	Ardnurcher or Horseleap	Mullingar
Teernacreeve	303	Moycashel	Castletownkindalen	Mullingar
Teevrevagh	96	Fore	Rathgarve	Castletowndelvin
Templanstown	179	Fore	Faughalstown	Castletowndelvin
Templanstown	205	Fore	St. Feighins	Castletowndelvin
Templemacateer	136	Moycashel	Ardnurcher or Horseleap	Mullingar
Templeoran (or Piercefield)	740	Moygoish	Templeoran	Mullingar
Templeoran North	280	Fartullagh	Clonfad	Mullingar
Templeoran South	40	Fartullagh	Clonfad	Mullingar
Templepatrick	272	Rathconrath	Templepatrick	Ballymahon
Temple's Island	2	Kilkenny West	Kilkenny West	Athlone
Tevrin	343	Moyashel and Magheradernon	Rathconnell	Mullingar
Thomastown	68	Farbill	Killucan	Mullingar
Tinode	723	Moygoish	Street	Granard
Tober	192	Corkaree	Multyfarnham	Mullingar
Toberaquill	363	Corkaree	Taghmon	Mullingar
Tobercleare	463	Kilkenny West	Kilkenny West	Athlone
Tobercormick	501	Rathconrath	Ballymorin	Mullingar
Tobernagauhoge	118	Kilkenny West	Kilkenny West	Athlone
Togher	676	Fore	Foyran	Granard
Togherstown	606	Rathconrath	Conry	Mullingar
Tonagh	446	Kilkenny West	Kilkenny West	Athlone
Tonaghmore&Hammondstown	546	Fore	St. Feighins	Castletowndelvin
Tonaphort	238	Moycashel	Kilbeggan	Tullamore
Tonashammer	539	Fore	St. Feighins	Castletowndelvin
Tonlegee (or Moorerow)	297	Fartullagh	Kilbride	Mullingar
Tonlegee	76	Kilkenny West	Noughaval	Ballymahon
Tonlemony	104	Rathconrath	Templepatrick	Ballymahon
Tonyowen Lower	157	Fore	Foyran	Granard
Tonyowen Upper	196	Fore	Foyran	Granard
Toor Commons	14	Moygoish	Kilbixy	Mullingar
Toorbeg	218	Kilkenny West	Drumraney	Athlone
Toorcoffey	13	Rathconrath	Killare	Mullingar
Toorevagh	148	Rathconrath	Ballymore	Ballymahon
Toorfelim	279	Clonlonan	Kilmanaghan	Athlone
Toorillon (or Rowe)	60	Rathconrath	Killare	Mullingar
Toorlisnamore	583	Moycashel	Castletownkindalen	Mullingar
Toorydonnellan	111	Clonlonan	Kilcleagh	Athlone
Tornanstown	130	Fartullagh	Lynn	Mullingar
Torque	157	Moycashel	Newtown	Mullingar
Townparks	391	Fore	Rathgarve	Castletowndelvin
Tristernagh	158	Moygoish	Kilbixy	Mullingar
Tristernagh Demesne	380	Moygoish	Kilbixy	Mullingar
Tromra	697	Fore	Rathgarve	Granard
Tubbrit	86	Clonlonan	Kilcleagh	Athlone
Tuitestown	543	Fore	Kilpatrick	Castletowndelvin
Tuitestown	729	Moyashel and Magheradernon	Mullingar	Mullingar
Tullagh Upper (or Killeenbane)	55	Rathconrath	Killare	Mullingar
Tullaghan	142	Kilkenny West	Kilkenny West	Athlone
Tullaghan	633	Moyashel and Magheradernon	Mullingar	Mullingar
Tullaghanmore	122	Moycashel	Castletownkindalen	Mullingar
Tullaghanshanlin	162	Clonlonan	Ballyloughloe	Athlone
Tullaghansleek	51	Moycashel	Castletownkindalen	Mullingar
Tullaghnacrossan	77	Moycashel	Castletownkindalen	Mullingar
Tullanageeragh	55	Clonlonan	Kilcleagh	Athlone
Tullanisky	759	Fartullagh	Lynn	Mullingar
Tullin	108	Brawny	St. Mary's	Athlone
Tully	535	Clonlonan	Ballyloughloe	Athlone
Tullybane	299	Clonlonan	Ballyloughloe	Athlone
Tullycross	298	Brawny	St. Mary's	Athlone
Tullyhill	99	Fore	Foyran	Granard
Tullyhogan	46	Kilkenny West	Kilkenny West	Athlone
Tullyhumphrys	21	Kilkenny West	Kilkenny West	Athlone
Tullylanesborough	40	Kilkenny West	Kilkenny West	Athlone
Tullynally (or Pakenhamhall)	471	Fore	Mayne	Granard
Tullystown	477	Fore	Foyran	Granard
Tullywood	275	Clonlonan	Ballyloughloe	Athlone
Turbotstown	305	Fore	Moyne	Granard
Twyford	535	Clonlonan	Ballyloughloe	Athlone
Tyfarnham	313	Corkaree	Tyfarnham	Mullingar
**Tyrrellspass**	Town	Fartullagh	Clonfad	Mullingar
**Tyrrellspass**	Town	Fartullagh	Newtown	Mullingar
Tyrrellspass	398	Fartullagh	Clonfad	Mullingar
Tyrrellstown	368	Fartullagh	Moylisker	Mullingar
Umma Beg (or Moneynamanagh)	207	Rathconrath	Ballymore	Athlone
Umma More	387	Rathconrath	Ballymore	Athlone
Ushnagh Hill	251	Rathconrath	Conry	Mullingar
Vilanstown	600	Fartullagh	Lynn	Mullingar
Wadestown	80	Farbill	Killucan	Mullingar
Walderstown	402	Kilkenny West	Drumraney	Ballymahon
Walshestown North	327	Moyashel and Magheradernon	Mullingar	Mullingar
Walshestown South	898	Moyashel and Magheradernon	Mullingar	Mullingar
Walterstown	206	Fartullagh	Carrick	Mullingar
Wardenstown	184	Farbill	Killucan	Mullingar
Warren High	283	Clonlonan	Ballyloughloe	Athlone
Warren Lower	72	Clonlonan	Ballyloughloe	Athlone
Warrensfields	6	Brawny	St. Mary's	Athlone
Waterstown	904	Kilkenny West	Kilkenny West	Athlone
Wattstown	284	Corkaree	Portloman	Mullingar
Whinning	239	Kilkenny West	Bunown	Athlone
Whitewell	403	Fartullagh	Kilbride	Mullingar
Williamstown (Briscoe)	244	Delvin	Killulagh	Castletowndelvin
Williamstown (Rockford)	163	Delvin	Killulagh	Castletowndelvin
Williamstown	221	Fore	Mayne	Granard
Williamstown	321	Clonlonan	Ballyloughloe	Athlone
Williamstown	490	Fore	Foyran	Granard
Williamstown	762	Rathconrath	Piercetown	Ballymahon
Williamstown New	291	Rathconrath	Piercetown	Ballymahon
Windmill (or Blackislands)	152	Fartullagh	Enniscoffey	Mullingar
Windtown	158	Moygoish	Rathaspick	Granard
Windtown	470	Moyashel and Magheradernon	Mullingar	Mullingar
Windtown	497	Fore	St. Feighins	Castletowndelvin
Windtown North	114	Moygoish	Russagh	Granard
Windtown South	190	Moygoish	Russagh	Granard
Wooddown	906	Farbill	Killucan	Mullingar
Yorkfield	47	Moyashel and Magheradernon	Dysart	Mullingar
