= Ardmore =

Ardmore comes from the Irish: Ard Mór or the Scottish Gaelic: Àird Mhòr meaning "great height" and may refer to:

== Places ==
=== Canada ===
- Ardmore, Alberta
- Ardmore, a neighbourhood in North Saanich, British Columbia
- Ardmore Beach, a community in Tiny, Ontario

=== Republic of Ireland ===
See § United Kingdom below for places in Northern Ireland

- Ardmore, County Donegal, a townland by Muff; see List of townlands of County Donegal
- Ardmore, County Waterford, a seaside resort and fishing village
- Ardmore, County Westmeath, a townland in Mullingar civil parish

=== New Zealand ===
- Ardmore, New Zealand

=== United Kingdom ===
==== Northern Ireland ====
- Ardmore, County Antrim, Northern Ireland
- Ardmore, County Fermanagh, a townland in County Fermanagh, Northern Ireland
- Ardmore, County Londonderry, Northern Ireland
- Ardmore, County Tyrone, a townland of County Tyrone, Northern Ireland

==== Scotland ====
- Ardmore, Barra, Outer Hebrides, Scotland
- Ardmore, Easter Ross, Highland, Scotland

=== United States ===
- Ardmore, Alabama, a town
- Ardmore (Atlanta), Georgia
- Ardmore, Indiana, an unincorporated community
- Ardmore, Maryland, an unincorporated community
- Ardmore, Missouri, an unincorporated community
- Ardmore Historic District in Winston-Salem, North Carolina
- Ardmore, Oklahoma, a city and county seat (the most populated place named Ardmore in the United States)
  - Ardmore Historic Commercial District
- Ardmore, Pennsylvania, an unincorporated community
- Ardmore, South Dakota, an unincorporated community
- Ardmore, Tennessee, a city

== Transportation ==
- Ardmore railway station, a former railway station in Ardmore, County Londonderry, Northern Ireland, U.K.
- Ardmore Avenue station (Illinois), a former train station in Villa Park, Illinois
- Ardmore station (Oklahoma), an Amtrak station in Ardmore, Oklahoma
- Ardmore station (Pennsylvania), an Amtrak and SEPTA station in Ardmore, Pennsylvania
- Ardmore Avenue (SEPTA station), a SEPTA station in Ardmore, Pennsylvania
- Ardmore Junction (SEPTA station), a SEPTA station in Ardmore, Pennsylvania
- Pennsylvania Route 8, known as Ardmore Boulevard

== Other uses ==
- Bishop of Ardmore, a bishopric in Ardmore, County Waterford
- Ardmore Airport (New Zealand), Auckland, New Zealand
- Ardmore distillery
- Ardmore Studios, a film studio in County Wicklow, Republic of Ireland
