= Robinstown =

Robinstown may refer to the following places:

- Robinstown (Levinge), a townland in Mullingar, County Westmeath, Ireland
- Robinstown (Tyrrell), a townland in Mullingar, County Westmeath, Ireland
- Robinstown, Carrick, a townland in County Westmeath, Ireland
- Robinstown, County Meath, a village and townland in County Meath, Ireland

== See also ==
- Robins Township, Fall River County, South Dakota
