= Culleen More =

Culleen More An Coillín Mór
- Townland
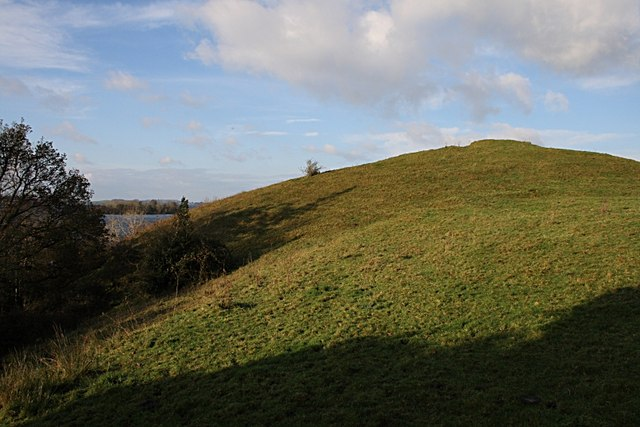
- Captain's Hill in the western part of Culleen More

- Location of Culleen More within County Westmeath in the Republic of Ireland
- Coordinates: 53°33′33″N 7°21′7″W
- Country: Ireland
- Province: Leinster
- County: County Westmeath
- Irish grid reference: N429567

Culleen More (Irish: An Coillín Mór, meaning 'the little wood') is a townland in County Westmeath, Ireland. It is located immediately north of Mullingar.

Culleen More is one of 64 townlands of the civil parish of Mullingar in the barony of Moyashel and Magheradernon in the Province of Leinster.

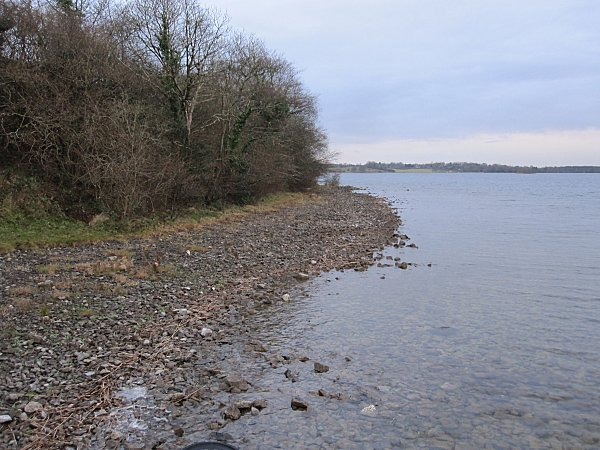
Culleen More shore of Lough Owel

The townland covers 838.79 acres (3.39 km^{2}). The western boundary of the townland is formed by the shoreline of Lough Owel. The N4, a national primary road connecting Dublin with the north–west of Ireland and the coastal town of Sligo, passes to the east of Lough Owel and traverses the townland from southeast to northwest. The Dublin–Sligo railway line of the national rail company Iarnród Éireann, carrying the Dublin to Longford commuter service and the Dublin to Sligo intercity service, also passes through the townland.

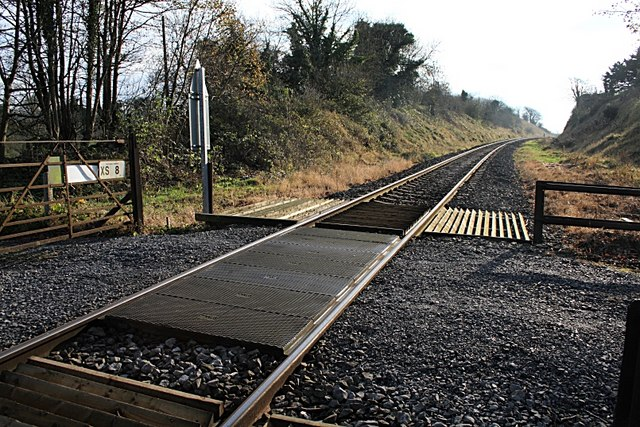
Level crossing of the Dublin to Sligo railway line in Culleen More townland

The neighbouring townlands are: Portnashangan and Ballynagall to the north, Brockagh to the north–east, Culleen Beg to the south–east, Robinstown (Levinge), Ballyglass and Irishtown to the south and Farranistick to the south–west.

In the 1911 census of Ireland there were 32 houses and 159 inhabitants in the townland.
