= Irishtown =

Irishtown or Irish Town may refer to the following places:

Australia

- Irishtown, Victoria - a ghost town in the Castlemaine region
- Irishtown, Western Australia
- Irishtown, Tasmania

Canada

- Irishtown, New Brunswick
- Irishtown-Summerside, Newfoundland and Labrador
- Irishtown, Nova Scotia
- Irishtown, Prince Edward Island

Ireland

- Irishtown, County Mayo, village
- Irishtown, Dublin, inner suburb
  - Irishtown Stadium in the suburb
- Irishtown, Kilkenny, former borough
  - Irishtown (Parliament of Ireland constituency) for the borough
- Irishtown, Limerick, inner city area
- Irishtown, Mullingar, a townland in Mullingar civil parish, barony of Moyashel and Maheradermon, County Westmeath
- Irishtown, Rathconrath, a townland in Rathconrath civil parish, barony of Rathconrath, County Westmeath

United Kingdom, Northern Ireland

- Irishtown, County Antrim, see List of townlands in County Antrim

United States

- Irishtown, California
- Irishtown Township, Clinton County, Illinois
- Irishtown, a hamlet within Minerva, New York

Other

- Irish Town, Gibraltar

== See also ==
- Lists of towns in Ireland
- Irishtown Bend, Cleveland, Ohio
