= Ballagh =

Ballagh may refer to:

== Places in Ireland ==
- Ballagh, Tipperary, the name of teo townlands; see List of townlands of County Tipperary
- Ballagh, Kilcumreragh, a townland in Kilcumreragh civil parish, County Westmeath
- Ballagh, County Westmeath, a townland in Mullingar civil parish
- The Ballagh, a village in County Wexford

== Other ==
- Faugh-a-Ballagh, a Thoroughbred race horse
- Faugh A Ballagh, a battle cry of Irish origin
- Oulart–The Ballagh GAA, a Gaelic games club in County Wexford, Ireland
- Robert Ballagh (born 1943), an Irish artist
