= Ballynaclin =

- Townland
- Location in Ireland
- Coordinates: 53°31′10″N 7°25′36″W
- Country: Ireland
- County: County Westmeath
- Parish: Mullingar

Ballynaclin is a townland in the civil parish of Mullingar in County Westmeath, Ireland.

The townland is located to the west of Mullingar town, and to the north of Ballinea. A section of the Royal Canal and the village of Shandonagh are located in the townland.
