= Strattonstown =

Townland in County Westmeath, Ireland

Strattonstown is a townland in the civil parish of Mullingar in County Westmeath, Ireland.

The townland is located to the west of Mullingar town, on the R390 regional road. The village of Ballinea is to the east.
