= Marlinstown =

Town in Ireland

Marlinstown is a townland in the civil parish of Mullingar in County Westmeath, Ireland. Mullingar Park Hotel is located in the townland.

The townland is located to the east of Mullingar town, and to the north of Ballinea. A section of the Royal Canal and the N4 road pass through the townland.
