= Robinstown (Tyrrell) =

Townland in County Westmeath, Ireland

Robinstown (Tyrrell) is a townland in Mullingar civil parish in County Westmeath, Ireland. The townland, which is 0.39 square miles (1.0 km^{2}) in area, had no recorded population as of the 2011 census. It is named for the Tyrrell baronets.

The Royal Canal passes through the townland, and the area is bordered by Culleen Beg to the east, Mullingar and Robinstown (Levinge) to the west.
