= Mullingar (civil parish) =

Civil parish in County Westmeath, Ireland

Mullingar An Muileann gCearr
- Civil parish
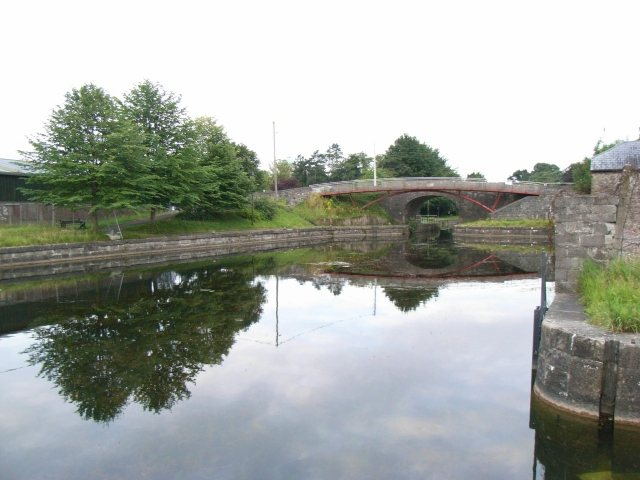
- Royal Canal in Mullingar

- Location of Mullingar within County Westmeath in the Republic of Ireland
- Coordinates: 53°31′22″N 7°22′15″W
- Country: Ireland
- Province: Leinster
- County: County Westmeath
- Irish grid reference: N418527

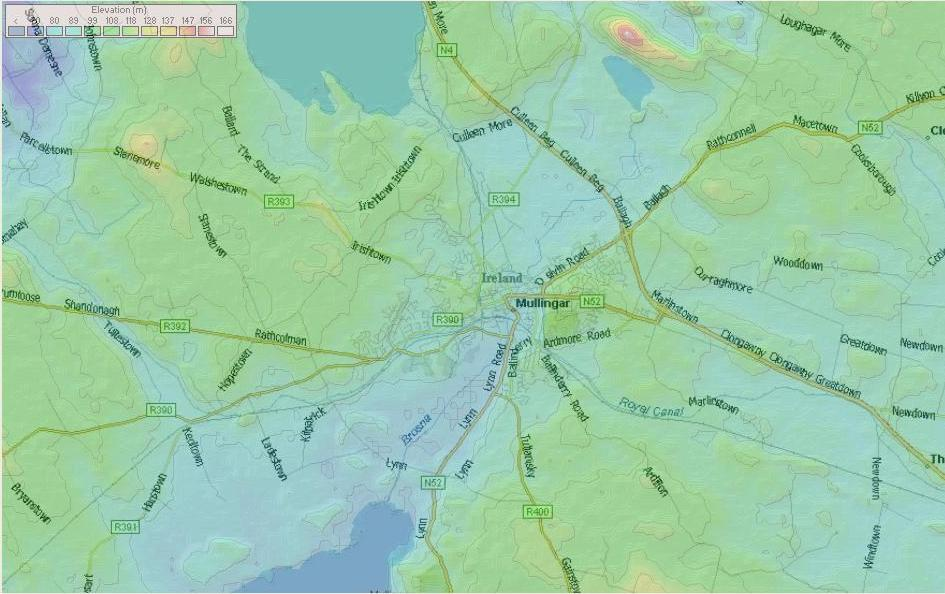
Map of the parish area

Mullingar (Irish: An Muileann gCearr, meaning 'the left–handed mill') is a civil parish in County Westmeath, Ireland. It includes Mullingar the county town of Westmeath, as well as the eponymous townland. Mullingar parish is located about 75 kilometres (47 mi) west of Dublin on the N4 road and the N52 road which meet east of Mullingar town. It is served by Mullingar railway station on the Dublin to Sligo line. The Royal Canal also passes through the parish and the town.

Lough Ennell lies to the south of Mullingar, Lough Owel to the north.

Mullingar is one of three civil parishes in the barony of Moyashel and Magheradernon in the Province of Leinster. The civil parish covers 22,435.6 acres (90.794 km^{2}). Parts of the parish (Cartronganny, Clownstown, part of Plodstown and Russellstown) are in the neighbouring barony of Fartullagh.

The neighbouring civil parishes are: Portnashangan (barony of Corkaree) to the north, Rathconnell to the north‑east, Killucan (barony of Farbill) to the east, Lynn (barony of Fartullagh) to the south‑east and south, Dysart and Churchtown (barony of Rathconrath) to the south‑west, Rathconrath (Rathconrath) to the west and Templeoran (barony of Moygoish) and Portloman (Corkaree) to the north‑west.

== Townlands ==
Mullingar civil parish comprises 63 townlands: Ardivaghan, Ardmore, Balgarrett, Ballagh, Balleagny, Ballina, Ballinderry, Ballyglass, Ballynaclin, Balnamona (or Charlestown), Baltrasna, Bellmount (or Curristown), Bellview, Boardstown, Brockagh, Brottonstown, Brottonstown Little, Cartron, Cartronganny, Clondardis, Clongawny, Clonmore, Clownstown, Commons, Culleen Beg, Culleen More, Drumloose, Farranfolliot, Farranistick, Farranshock (or Rathgowan), Glascarn, Grange North, Grange South, Habsborough, Hanstown, Hopestown, Irishtown, Keoltown, Kilpatrick, Knockdrin Demesne, Ladestown, Marlinstown, Marlinstown Bog, Mullingar, Newtown, Petitswood, Plodstown, Quarry, Rathcolman, Robinstown (Levinge), Robinstown (Tyrrell), Russellstown, Sarsanstown, Slanestown, Spittlefield (or Springfield), Srahenry, Stokestown, Strattonstown, Tuitestown, Tullaghan, Walshestown North, Walshestown South and Windtown.
