= Balnamona or Charlestown =

Townland in County Westmeath, Ireland

Coordinates: 53.51349°N 7.37966°W

Balnamona or Charlestown is a townland in the civil parish of Mullingar in County Westmeath, Ireland.

The townland is approximately 0.38 km^{2} (0.15 sq mi) in area. It is located in the west of Mullingar town, the R392 regional road borders the area to the north, and the Royal Canal flows through the centre of the townland. As of the 2011 census it had a population of 7 people.
