= Lilliput (townland) =

Nure or Lilliput An tIúr
- Townland
- Location of Lilliput within County Westmeath in the Republic of Ireland
- Coordinates: 53°26′44″N 07°26′24″W
- Country: Ireland
- Province: Leinster
- County: County Westmeath
- Irish grid reference: N369476

Lilliput (or Nure) is a townland in County Westmeath, Ireland. It is located five miles (8 kilometres) south of Mullingar and lies at the southern end of Lough Ennell. Lilliput covers an area of 244 acres and was recorded with a population of 22.

Lilliput is one of 11 townlands in the civil parish of Dysart, in the Barony of Moycashel. It lies in the electoral division of Middleton of the Longford–Westmeath constituency.

Lilliput is associated with Jonathan Swift, writer of Gulliver's Travels. Local tradition states that Swift was in a boat on the lake, and when he looked back to shore he noticed how small the people looked at that distance. This was the inspiration for the diminutive Lilliputians, who feature in his most famous book Gulliver's Travels. Lilliput at the time was called "Nure": however after the publication of Gulliver's Travels locals began to refer to the lakeshore as "Lilliput". The name stuck and the area was renamed during the 18th century. There is also an early Christian association, in that St. Patrick's sister, Lupita, is known to the Lilliput area, which may also recall her name.

Lilliput is the site of Lilliput House, built in the 18th century, and now home to the Lilliput Adventure Centre; it lies in what is now the Jonathan Swift Amenity Park.
