= Balleagny =

Townland in County Westmeath, Ireland

Balleagny is a townland in the civil parish of Mullingar in County Westmeath, Ireland.

The townland is located to the west of Mullingar town, on the banks of the Royal Canal. The R392 road passes to the south of the area.
