= Shandonagh =

Shandonagh Seandomhnach
- Village
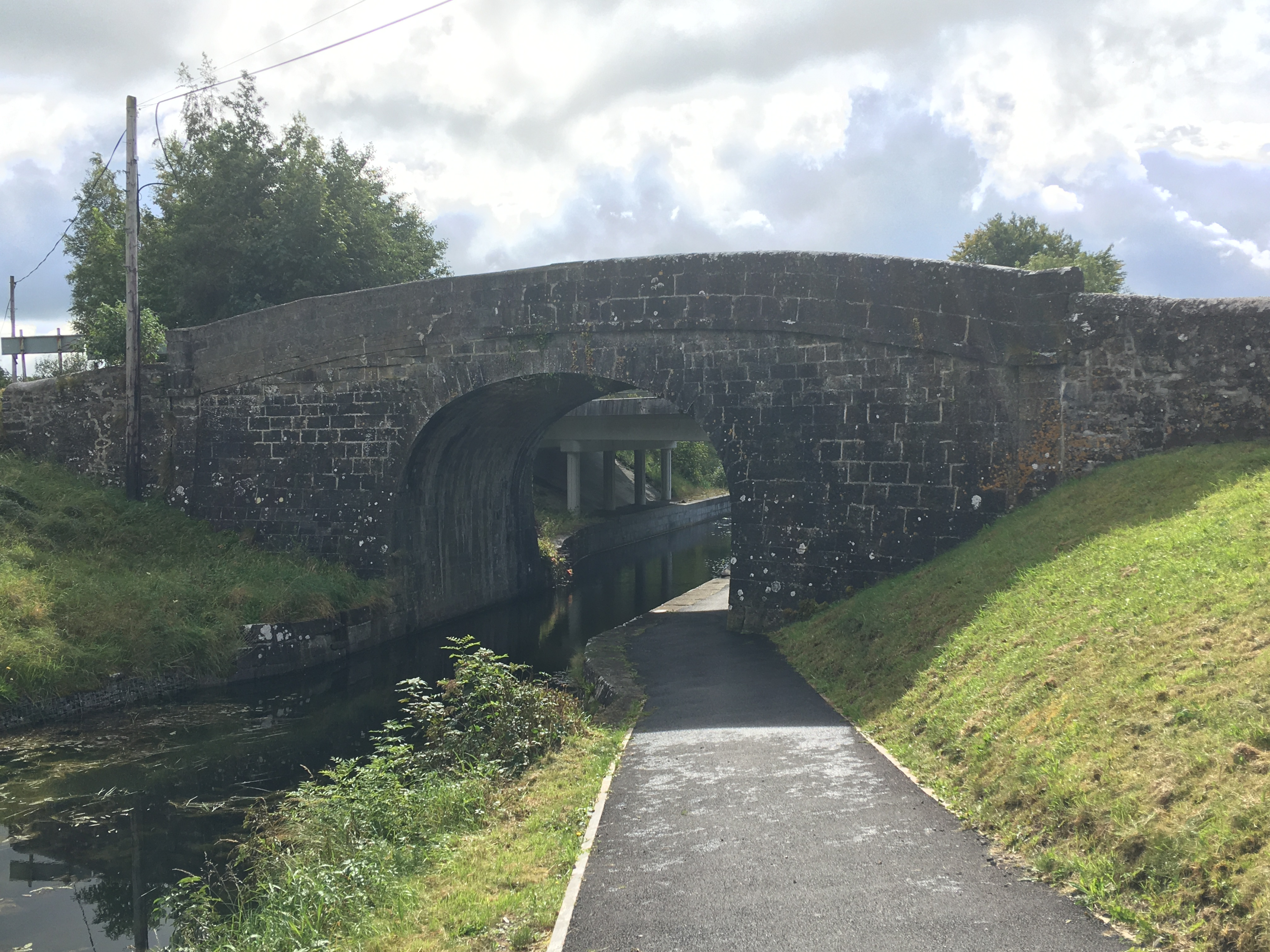
- The old Shanonagh Bridge over the Royal Canal

- Location in Ireland
- Coordinates: 53°31′20″N 7°26′35″W
- Country: Ireland
- Province: Leinster
- County: County Westmeath
- Time zone: UTC+0 (WET)
  - Summer (DST): UTC-1 (IST (WEST))
- Irish Grid Reference: N503438

Shandonagh (Irish: Seandomhnach), also Shanonagh, is a village in County Westmeath, Ireland. It is located on the R392 road, to the west of Mullingar.

The Royal Canal flows through the town, with the Shandonagh bridge being used to cross to the western side.

The village also has a local GAA team.

== See also ==
- List of towns and villages in Ireland
