= Ardmore, Easter Ross =

Coordinates: 57.846°N 4.183°W

Ardmore: Scottish Gaelic: An Àird Mhòr
- Location within the Highland council area
- OS grid reference: NH705862
- Council area: Highland
- Country: Scotland
- Sovereign state: United Kingdom
- Postcode district: IV25 3
- Police: Scotland
- Fire: Scottish
- Ambulance: Scottish
- UK Parliament: Caithness, Sutherland and Easter Ross
- Scottish Parliament: Caithness, Sutherland and Ross

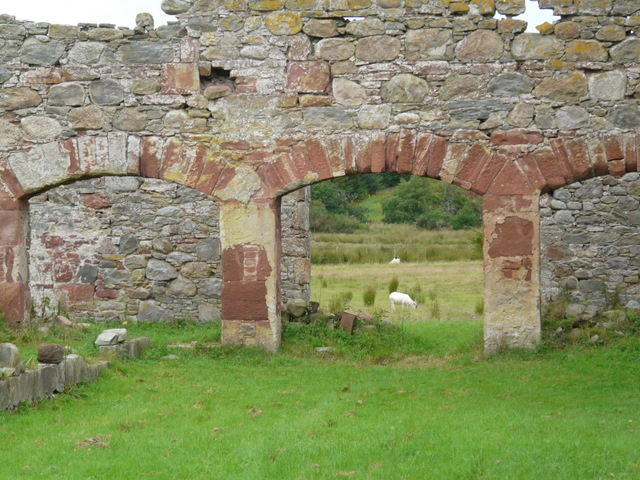

Ardmore (Scottish Gaelic: An Àird Mhòr) is a village on the south shore of Dornoch Firth in Tain, Ross-shire, Highland and is in the Scottish council area of Highland.
