= Ballinderry, County Westmeath =

Townland in County Westmeath, Ireland

- Townland
- Location in Ireland
- Coordinates: 53°30′55″N 7°20′00″W
- Country: Ireland
- County: County Westmeath
- Parish: Mullingar

Ballinderry is a townland in the civil parish of Mullingar in County Westmeath, Ireland.

The townland is located in the south of Mullingar town. The Royal Canal passes through the area, and the Mullingar Greyhound Stadium is located to the north of the townland.
