= Culleen Beg =

Coordinates: 53°33′03″N 7°19′37″W

- Townland
- Interactive map of Culleen Beg
- Country: Ireland
- Province: Leinster
- County: County Westmeath

Culleen Beg (Irish: An Coillín Beag) is a townland in the parish of Mullingar and the barony of Moyashel and Magheradernon, County Westmeath, Ireland. Located north of Mullingar town, the townland borders Culleen More to the west, Brockagh and Quarry to the north, Ballagh, Clonsheever & Rathconnell to the east and Robinstown and Springfield or Spittlefield to the south.
