= Ardmore Historic Commercial District =

Historic district in Oklahoma, United States

- U.S. National Register of Historic Places
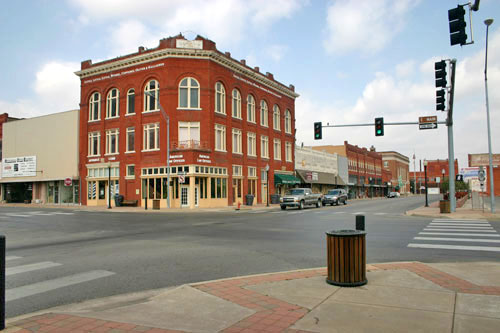

- Location within Oklahoma
- Location: Main St. fr. Santa Fe RR tracks to B St., N. Washington fr. Main to 2nd Ave. NE, Caddo fr. Main to N side of 2nd Ave. NE, Ardmore, Oklahoma
- Coordinates: 34°10′16″N 97°07′41″W
- Area: 19 acres (7.7 ha)
- Built: 1887
- Architect: C.E. Troutman, others
- Architectural style: Classical Revival, Late Victorian, Plains-Commercial
- NRHP reference No.: 83002080
- Added to NRHP: March 14, 1983

The Ardmore Historic Commercial District, in Ardmore, Oklahoma, is a 19 acres (7.7 ha) historic district which was listed on the National Register of Historic Places in 1983.

The district includes 97 "major structures", in total having 133 contributing buildings. It runs along Main St. from the former Santa Fe railroad tracks to B St., N. Washington from Main to 2nd Ave., NE., and Caddo from Main to the northern side of 2nd Ave., NE.

It includes:

- the U.S. Courthouse Building at 200-202 W. Main, a two-story red brick building designed by architect C.E.Troutman, built 1896–1898.
- Masonic Temple Building at northwest corner of Main and Washington Streets, built 1896–1898, a three-story red brick Victorian Romanesque building, with limestone and brick detailing.

Ardmore has an Ardmore Main Street Authority, one of the various Main Street programs which act in the interests of commercial district revitalization.
