= Slanestown =

Townland in County Westmeath, Ireland

Slanestown is a townland in the civil parish of Mullingar in County Westmeath, Ireland.

The townland is located to the west of Mullingar town, between the R393 and R392 regional roads.
