= Petitswood =

Townland of Mullingar in Westmeath

Petitswood (Irish: Coill an Pheitidigh) is a townland in the civil parish of Mullingar in County Westmeath, Ireland.

The townland is located in the east of Mullingar town, the N4 motorway passes through the east of the area, and the Royal Canal passes through the west.
