= Ballyglass, Mullingar =

Townland in County Westmeath, Ireland

- Townland
- Location in Ireland
- Coordinates: 53°32′38″N 7°21′09″W
- Country: Ireland
- County: County Westmeath
- Parish: Mullingar

Ballyglass is a townland in the civil parish of Mullingar in County Westmeath, Ireland.

The townland is located to the north of Mullingar town. The Royal Canal passes through the area before meeting Lough Owel to the northwest.
