= Ardmore, County Westmeath =

Ardmore An tArd Mór
- Townland
- Interactive map of Ardmore
- Coordinates: 53.51528°N 7.31448°W
- County: County Westmeath
- Country: Ireland

Ardmore is a small townland in Mullingar in County Westmeath, Ireland. The townland is approximately 0.2 square miles (0.5 km^{2}) in area and located in Mullingar civil parish. A section of the N52 road passes through the area, and the Royal Canal passes to the southeast of the townland. No population was recorded for the townland in the 2011 census.
