= Ballagh, County Westmeath =

Townland in County Westmeath, Ireland

- Townland
- Location in Ireland
- Coordinates: 53°32′17″N 7°18′44″W
- Country: Ireland
- County: County Westmeath
- Parish: Mullingar

Ballagh is a townland in the civil parish of Mullingar in County Westmeath, Ireland.

The townland is located in the north-east of Mullingar town, a large junction between the N4 and the N52 roads stands at the centre of the townland.
