= Irishtown, Mullingar =

Townland in County Westmeath, Ireland

Irishtown is a townland in Mullingar in County Westmeath, Ireland.

The townland is located to the north of the town, to the south of Lough Owel. St Finian's College stands on the townland.
