= Robinstown (Levinge) =

Townland in Mullingar, County Westmeath, Ireland

Robinstown (Levinge) is a townland in Mullingar in County Westmeath, Ireland. The townland, which is 0.48 square miles (1.2 km^{2}) in area, is named for the Levinge baronets. A mass grave that contains the remains of victims of the Great Famine is located in the townland.
