= Ballinea =

Village in County Westmeath, Ireland

Ballinea Béal an Átha
- Village
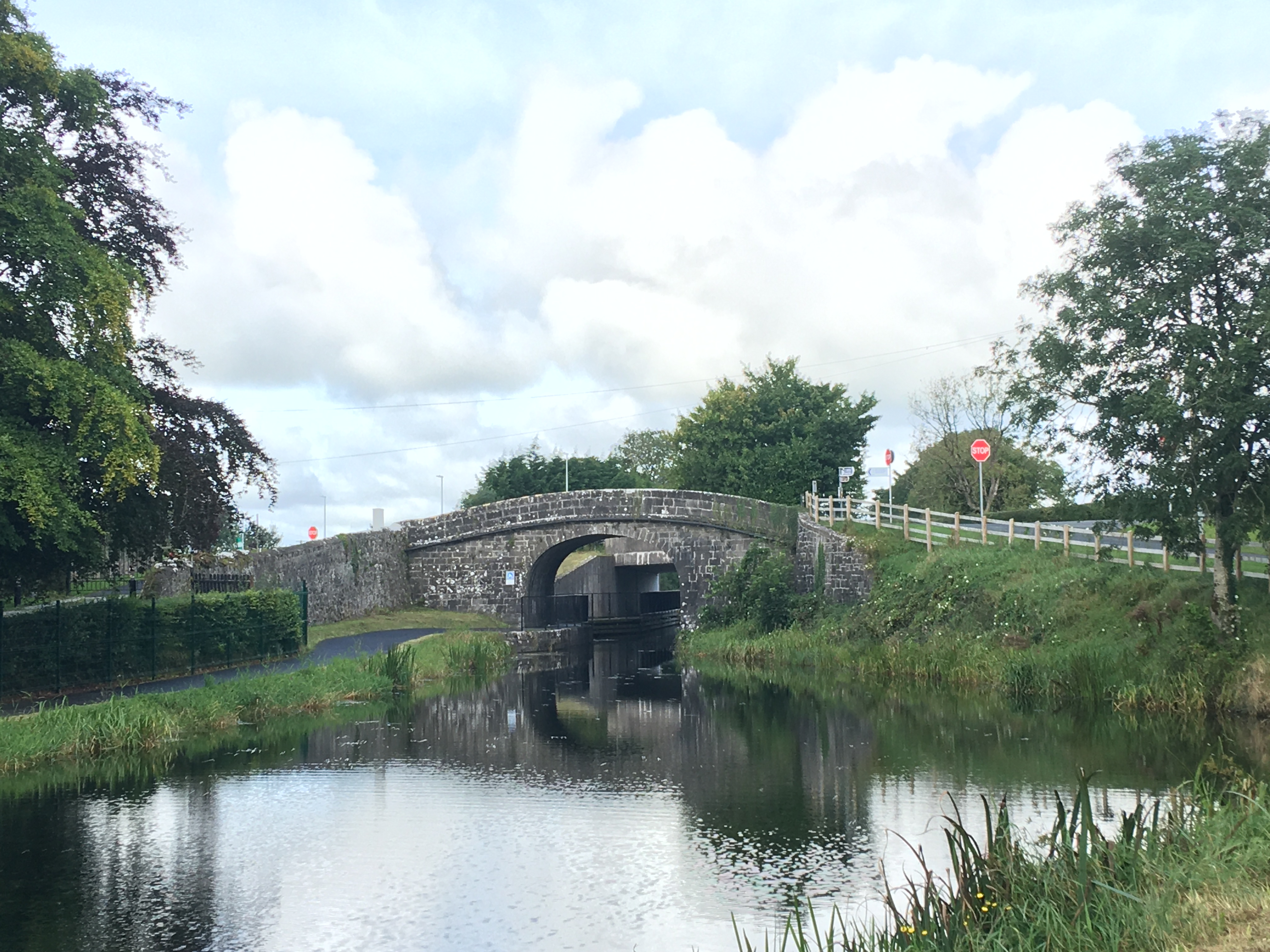
- Ballinea Bridge over the Royal Canal

- Location in Ireland
- Coordinates: 53°30′25″N 7°25′09″W
- Country: Ireland
- Province: Leinster
- County: County Westmeath
- Time zone: UTC+0 (WET)
  - Summer (DST): UTC-1 (IST (WEST))
- Irish Grid Reference: N384509

Ballinea or Ballina (Irish: Béal an Átha, meaning 'mouth of the ford'), is a village and townland in County Westmeath, Ireland. It is 5 km west of Mullingar town centre, on the R390 road. The Royal Canal flows through the village, with the Ballinea Bridge being used to cross to the western side.

== Amenities ==
The nearest primary school is St Kenny National School which is 1.4 km away.

The Royal Canal Way and Athlone to Mullingar Cycleway are accessible via Ballinea Bridge. There is also a children's playground near the bridge.

== See also ==
- List of towns and villages in Ireland
