= Wattstown Barrows =

Bronze Age burial sites in Westmeath, Ireland

- Dumhaí Bhaile Bhatt (Irish)
- Location within Ireland
- 53.575590°N 7.435572°W
- Type: tumuli
- Location: Wattstown, Portloman, County Westmeath, Ireland

History
- Built: c. 3000–2000 BC

Site notes
- Material: earth
- Owner: State

National monument of Ireland
- Official name: Wattstown
- Reference no.: 606

Wattstown Barrows are two tumuli (barrows) which form a National Monument in County Westmeath, Ireland.

== Location ==
Wattstown Barrows are located near the summit of Frewin Hill (173 m / 568 ft high), overlooking Lough Owel to the east.

== Description ==
Wattstown Barrows are a ring barrow and bowl barrow, burial sites of the Bronze Age, joined together by extending a bank and ditch from the ring barrow in an arc around the bowl barrow. There is also another bowl barrow and a tumulus or cairn.

According to legend, Frewin Hill was the site of the Battle of Frémainn in AD 507, where Failge Berraide defeated Fiachu mac Néill.
