= Galmoylestown =

Galmoylestown may refer to the following places in the Republic of Ireland:

- Galmoylestown Lower
- Galmoylestown Upper
