= Wattstown, County Westmeath =

Wattstown
- Townland
- Location of Wattstown within County Westmeath in the Republic of Ireland
- Coordinates: 53°34′28″N 7°25′28″W
- Country: Ireland
- Province: Leinster
- County: County Westmeath
- Irish grid reference: N381584

Wattstown is a townland in County Westmeath, Ireland. It is located about 7.64 kilometres (5 mi) north–west of Mullingar.

Wattstown is one of 8 townlands of the civil parish of Portloman in the barony of Corkaree in the Province of Leinster. The townland covers 282.11 acres (1.1417 km^{2}). The neighbouring townlands are: Balrath to the north, Portloman to the south, Monroe to the south, Monroe or Johnstown (Nugent) to the south–west, Ballyedward to the west, Johnstown to the west and Piercefield or Templeoran to the north–west. The north–eastern boundary of the townland is formed by the shoreline of Lough Owel.

In the 1911 census of Ireland there were 6 houses and 22 inhabitants in the townland.

Two barrows in the townland are listed as national monuments.
