= Templeoran (civil parish) =

Civil parish in County Westmeath, Ireland

Templeoran Teampall Odhráin
- Civil parish
- Location of Templeoran within County Westmeath, Ireland
- Coordinates: 53°33′25″N 7°27′35″W
- Country: Ireland
- Province: Leinster
- County: County Westmeath
- Irish grid reference: N359565

Templeoran (Irish: Teampall Odhráin, meaning 'Oran's church') is a civil parish in County Westmeath, Ireland. It is located about 8 km (5 mi) north‑west of Mullingar.

Templeoran is one of 6 civil parishes in the barony of Moygoish in the province of Leinster. The civil parish covers 5,186.1 acres (20.987 km^{2}).

Templeoran civil parish comprises 12 townlands: Cartron, Clondardis, Coolnahay, Gaddrystown, Johnstown, Kildallan, Kildallan North, Monroe or Johnstown (Nugent), Parcellstown, Shanonagh, Sonnagh Demesne and Templeoran also known as Piercefield or Templeoran.

The neighbouring civil parishes are: Leny (barony of Corkaree) to the north, Portloman (Corkaree) to the north‑east, Dysart (baronies of Moyashel and Magheradernon, Moycashel and Rathconrath) to the east, Mullingar (Moyashel and Magheradernon) to the south‑east and south, Rathconrath (Rathconrath) to the south‑west, Kilmacnevan to the west and Kilbixy to the north‑west.
