= Monkstown =

Monkstown may refer to:

== Locations ==
- Monkstown, County Antrim, a small village in County Antrim, Northern Ireland
- Monkstown, County Cork, a suburban town in County Cork, located in Cork Harbour.
- Monkstown, Dublin, a suburb near Dún Laoghaire on the outskirts of Dublin city in County Dublin
- Monkstown, County Westmeath, a townland in Taghmon civil parish
- Monkstown, Newfoundland and Labrador, a municipality
- Monkstown Community School, a school in County Antrim

== Transportation ==
- Monkstown railway station (County Cork), a former railway station in Monkstown, County Cork, Ireland
- Monkstown railway station (Northern Ireland), a former station in Monkstown, County Antrim, Northern Ireland
- Salthill and Monkstown railway station, in Monkstown, Dublin, Ireland
