= Piercefield =

Piercefield is a placename and may refer to:

- Piercefield, County Westmeath, a townland in Portnashangan civil parish, barony of Corkaree, County Westmeath, Ireland
- Piercefield House, a largely ruined neo-classical country house located near Chepstow in Monmouthshire, south–east Wales
- Piercefield, New York, a town in St. Lawrence County, New York, United States.
- Piercefield or Templeoran, also known as Templeoran, a townland in Templeoran civil parish, barony of Moygoish, County Westmeath, Ireland
