= Knockdrin, Taghmon =

Knockdrin Cnoc Droinne
- Townland
- Location of Knockdrin within County Westmeath in the Republic of Ireland
- Coordinates: 53°34′34″N 7°18′8″W
- Country: Ireland
- Province: Leinster
- County: County Westmeath
- Irish grid reference: N462586

Knockdrin (Irish: Cnoc Droinne) is a townland in County Westmeath, Ireland. It is located about 6.34 kilometres (4 mi) north–north–east of Mullingar.

Knockdrin spans the civil parishes of Taghmon and Tyfarnham. It is one of the 11 townlands in Taghmon and one of the 11 townlands in Tyfarnham, both in the barony of Corkaree in the Province of Leinster. The townland covers approximately 71 acres (0.29 km^{2}) in Taghmon and 58 acres (0.23 km^{2}) in Tyfarnham, a total of 129 acres (0.52 km^{2}).

The neighbouring townlands are: Garraree, Knockatee and Toberaquill to the north, Brittas to the east, Knockdrin Demesne to the south and Kilmaglish to the north–west.

In the 1911 census of Ireland there were 8 houses and 39 inhabitants in the townland.
