= Larkinstown, County Westmeath =

Larkinstown
- Townland
- Location of Larkinstown within County Westmeath in the Republic of Ireland
- Coordinates: 53°36′28″N 7°20′47″W
- Country: Ireland
- Province: Leinster
- County: County Westmeath
- Irish grid reference: N433621

Larkinstown is a townland in County Westmeath, Ireland. It is located about 9.21 kilometres (6 mi) north of Mullingar.

Larkinstown is one of 11 townlands of the civil parish of Stonehall in the barony of Corkaree in the Province of Leinster. The townland covers 219.37 acres (0.8878 km^{2}).

The neighbouring townlands are: Stonehall to the north, Blackmiles to the north–east, Galmoylestown Lower to the east, Garrysallagh to the south, Tyfarnham to the west and Killintown to the north–west.

In the 1911 census of Ireland there were 2 houses and 10 inhabitants in the townland.
