= Tullaghan, Mullingar =

Tullaghan An Tulachán
- Townland
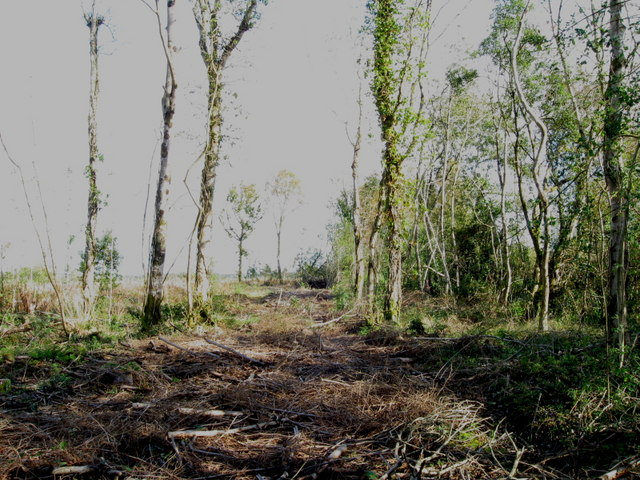
- Woodland in Tullaghan townland near the shore of Lough Owel

- Location of Tullaghan within County Westmeath in the Republic of Ireland
- Coordinates: 53°32′55″N 7°22′58″W
- Country: Ireland
- Province: Leinster
- County: County Westmeath
- Irish grid reference: N409555

Tullaghan (Irish: An Tulachán) is a townland in County Westmeath, Ireland. It is located about 3.66 kilometres (2 mi) north–west of Mullingar on the southern shore of Lough Owel.

Tullaghan is one of 64 townlands of the civil parish of Mullingar in the barony of Moyashel and Magheradernon in the Province of Leinster. The townland covers 633 acres (2.56 km^{2}). The neighbouring townlands are: Farranistick to the north–east, Irishtown to the south–east, Walshestown South and Part of Walshestown North to the south, Walshestown North to the south–west and Ballard to the north–west.

In the 1911 census of Ireland there were 2 houses and 8 inhabitants in the townland.
