= Mountmurray =

- Townland
- Location of Mountmurray within County Westmeath in the Republic of Ireland
- Coordinates: 53°35′28″N 7°25′36″W
- Country: Ireland
- Province: Leinster
- County: County Westmeath
- Irish grid reference: N380603

Mountmurray, formerly Ballinsellot, is a townland in County Westmeath, Ireland. It is located about 9 kilometres (6 mi) north–west of Mullingar.

Mountmurray is one of 8 townlands of the civil parish of Portnashangan in the barony of Corkaree in the Province of Leinster. The townland covers 357 acres (1.44 km^{2}). The neighbouring townlands are: Kilpatrick and Rathbennett to the north, Balrath to the south and Grangegeeth and Piercefield to the west. The eastern boundary of the townland is formed by the shoreline of Lough Owel.

Mount Murray, a late eighteenth century country house, was built for Alexander Murray to replace an earlier house or castle dating from 1646.

In the 1911 census of Ireland there were 4 houses and 26 inhabitants in the townland.
