= Balrath, Portloman =

Townland in County Westmeath, Ireland

Balrath
- Townland
- Location of Balrath within County Westmeath in the Republic of Ireland
- Coordinates: 53.5811948°N 7.4270884°W
- Country: Ireland
- Province: Leinster
- County: County Westmeath
- Irish grid reference: N379591

Balrath is a townland in County Westmeath, Ireland. It is located about 8 kilometres (5 mi) north–west of Mullingar.

Balrath is one of 8 townlands of the civil parish of Portloman in the barony of Corkaree in the Province of Leinster. The townland covers 279.56 acres (1.1313 km^{2}). The neighbouring townlands are: Mountmurray to the north and east, Wattstown to the south, Ballyedward to the south–west, Piercefield or Templeoran to the west and Grangegeeth to the north–west. Part of the eastern boundary of the townland is formed by the shoreline of Lough Owel, opposite Glassford Island.

In the 1911 census of Ireland there were 7 houses and 17 inhabitants in the townland; 2 of the houses were unoccupied.
