= Kildallan, Westmeath =

Townland in County Westmeath, Ireland

Kildallan (from Irish Cill Dalláin, meaning 'The Church of Dallán Forgaill') is a townland in the civil parish of Templeoran, barony of Moygoish, County Westmeath, Ireland.

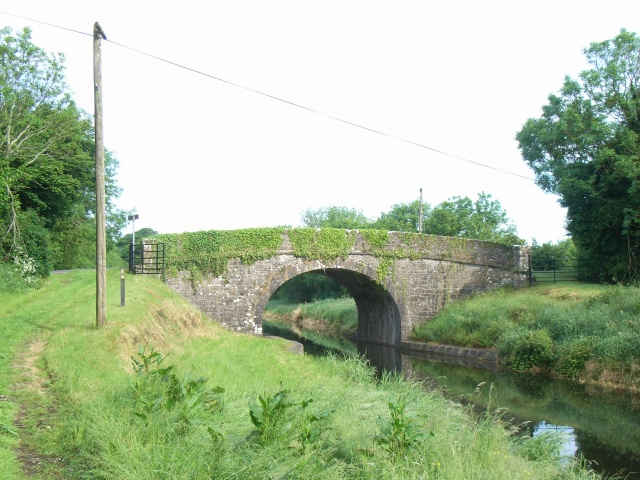
Kildallan Bridge on the Royal Canal, Co. Westmeath - geograph.org.uk - 831657

== Geography ==
Kildallan is bounded on the north by Sonna Demesne and Kildallan North townlands, on the west by Cartron townland, on the south by Gaddrystown townland and on the east by Parcellstown and Slane Beg townlands. Its chief geographical features are Kildallan Hill which reaches a height of 356 feet, the Royal Canal (which features Kildallan Locks, numbers 29-33), a plantation, small streams and pools. Kildallan is traversed by the R393 road (Ireland), the L5805 local road and minor lanes. The townland covers 225 acres.

== Etymology ==
The Down Survey map of 1655 spells the name as Killdolan and Kildolan and Killdelan and lists the owner as Sir Oliver Tuite. Kildallan North was not then a separate townland and formed part of Kildallan. it was not separated until the Ordnance survey of 1836. William Petty's map of 1685 depicts it as Killdellan.

== History ==
The townland was named after the Ollamh Érenn or Chief Poet of Ireland, Dallán Forgaill, who composed the "Amhra Coluim Cille" a panegyric on Saint Columba in c.597 in Portloman townland, which is two townlands to the east of Kildallan. Dallan was not a member of the clergy so he probably donated the townland to the church.

In medieval times the land was owned by the O'Casey or O'Cathasaigh clan of Saithne (now called Sonna). The Annals of the Four Masters contain several references to them under the years 1018, 1023, 1086, 1140, 1146, 1153, 1160, 1171, 1179, etc.

At the time of the Norman Invasion of Ireland, King Henry II of England granted to Hugh de Lacy, Lord of Meath, the lands of Ó Maoilsheachlainn, king of Meath in return for the service of 50 Knights. As one of de Lacy's barons, Risteárd de Tiúit received large grants in Westmeath and Longford. His descendants became the barons of Moyashell, in Westmeath. De Lacy conferred on the Tuite family the castle of O'Casey (Irish Ó Cathasaigh), chief of Saithne, now Sonna in Westmeath. This senior branch of the family became Protestant in order to hold on to their lands and remained on the lands until they moved to Britain in the 1920s.

Pender's Census of 1659 states there were 8 people aged over 15 in the townland, all of English extraction, (In general the percentage of the Irish population aged under 15 runs at about 20% so the total population of Kildallan in 1659 would have been roughly about 10).

An Inquisition held at Mullingar on 4 April 1665 spells the name Kildolan and traces the ownership of the townland from the early 17th century. A further Inquisition held at Kilbegan on 26 August 1679 spells the name Killdolan and traces the ownership of the townland from the early 17th century.

A map published c.1770 spells the name as Killdollan and depicts the holding of each tenant in the townland.

The Tithe Applotment Books of 1833 spell the name as Kildollan.

Griffith's Valuation of 1857 lists 21 landholders in the townland.

The townland remained in the ownership of the Tuite family down to the 20th century. A Chancery decree dated 30 June 1873 spells the name as Kildollan South.

The book Hibernia Venatica by Maurice O'Connor Morris published in 1878 describes a fox hunt through Kildollan Gorse.

In the 1901 census of Ireland, there were fifteen families listed in the townland.

In the 1911 census of Ireland, there were sixteen families listed in the townland.

A description of Kildallan in 1938 is viewable on the Dúchas website.

== Antiquities ==
1. Kildallan Bridge, built c. 1809 over the Royal Canal.
2. A tunnel under the canal is shown on the 1836 Ordnance Survey map.
3. Sonna National School, Roll No. 1422. This was situated in Kildallan on the 1836 Ordnance Survey Map but was subsequently moved to its present location in Cartron townland, where it is now called Odhran Naofa Sonna National School. Folklore from 1938 recorded at the school is on the Dúchas website.
4. Kildallan House
