= Rathcoole (Newtownabbey) =

Housing estate in Newtownabbey, Northern Ireland

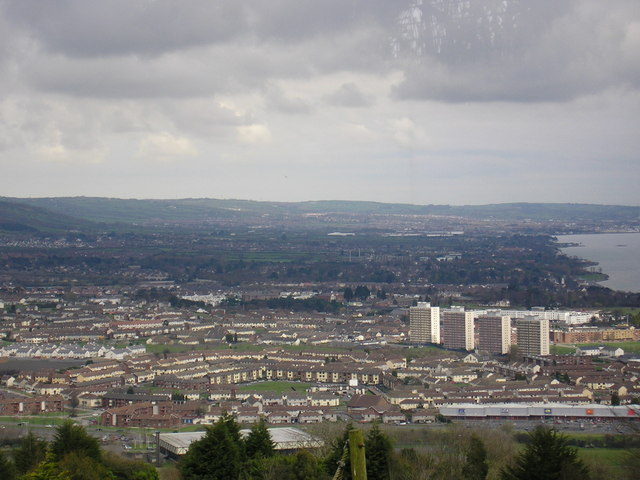
Rathcoole as seen from Cavehill

Rathcoole (from Irish Ráth Cúile 'corner/nook of the ringfort or Fort of Coole') is a housing estate in Newtownabbey, County Antrim, Northern Ireland. It was built in the 1950s to house many of those displaced by the demolition of inner city housing in Belfast city. Rathcoole is within the wider Antrim and Newtownabbey Borough. Its approximate borders are provided by O'Neill Road on the north, Doagh Road on the east, Shore Road on the south and Church Road and Merville Garden Village on the west.

== History ==
=== Housing developments ===
In the 1940s and 1950s, a number of new large-scale housing schemes were planned for Northern Ireland including Craigavon and Rathcoole. These plans were informed by attempts by successive UK governments and the local parliament at Stormont to use large-scale social engineering to reduce underlying sectarian tensions in Northern Ireland. In common with other such areas, Rathcoole's design included self-contained facilities such as a cinema, youth centre, a shopping centre and schools. In spite of these planned facilities, they were insufficient for a population that grew rapidly to over 10,000. The cinema was shut down and a taxi service took over the west wing of the building; the building was eventually demolished and a new bar was built on its grounds. Other housing developments were built nearby by the Northern Ireland Housing Trust. Other estates in the district were developed privately by Ulster Garden Villages Limited. Since April 1958, Rathcoole and the above estates have been a part of Newtownabbey, the first town in Ireland's history to be constituted by an Act of Parliament at Westminster. By 1977, Newtownabbey was given 'borough' status.

A feature of the community is its Protestant churches. In the early decades of its development, much of the commerce in the Rathcoole area was dominated by nearby Belfast. Since the 1970s, some local shopping facilities have been developed on what was a largely green field site centred around the Abbeycentre.

=== Civil unrest ===
Towards the end of the 1960s in a period known as known as the Troubles, civil unrest in Northern Ireland brought about sectarian conflict. In this period, Rathcoole became a home to many Protestants displaced from Belfast. From 1969-73, a common sight on the streets of urban working class areas of Northern Ireland was parties of people moving furniture. During this time, the Northern Ireland Housing Executive came into being in response to accusations that councils responsible for allocating public housing were using allocation as a means of favouring their own. Community vigilante groups acted as gatekeepers to such population exchanges in public housing areas and, in the early 1970s, police were briefly excluded from the area by the Rathcoole Defence Association (RDA).

Resource-starved authorities could do little but stand by and re-allocate housing on the basis of squatters becoming accepted as sitting tenants. In Rathcoole this was estimated at between 200 and 250 families in mid-1972. Many Catholic families were forced out of Rathcoole to the Irish republican Twinbrook estate in Belfast to be replaced by similarly displaced Protestant families from other areas. The estate was the scene of several sectarian murders and other violent crimes during the conflict. At around this time, some young disaffected young men became associated with the loyalist Tartan Gang in the estate named The Rathcoole KAI, the initials reportedly standing for Kill All Irish.

In subsequent years, at times of wider community stress in Northern Ireland, sporadic rioting with security forces occasionally occurred within the estate but not to the extent witnessed in urban areas of Belfast and Derry and the community has had long periods of calm. In October 2010, there was serious rioting in the area linked to the Ulster Volunteer Force and resulted in Translink suspending their services in the area for a period of time after some of their buses were hijacked and set on fire. Police also claimed a gunman from the UVF was sighted at the scene of the rioting. The unrest was believed to be a reaction to police raids in Rathcoole.

=== Decline and regeneration ===
The Diamond shopping centre suffered from a lack of investment and substantial decline in its environment throughout the 1960s and 1970s and was in need of extensive renovation and reconstruction. Part of this reconstruction led to the building of a large new branch library in the late 1970s. Meanwhile, the estate's other shopping area near Rathcoole Secondary School was declared derelict and demolished. Following an extensive fire and a period of dereliction, the reconstructed Alpha Cinema became the East Way Social Club, a loyalist members only working men's club.

== Education ==
Primary schools in the area have included the state controlled Rathcoole Primary, Abbot's Cross Primary and nearby Whitehouse Primary schools. The Catholic-maintained sector was served by Stella Maris Primary school. As the post–World War II baby boom generation grew older, school populations declined rapidly in the area, and in the 1980s and 1990s, Stella Maris Primary and Secondary Schools and Rathcoole Secondary School (state-controlled) were closed. The Stella Maris site was since redeveloped as a retail park as part of the larger Abbeycentre trading area. In an attempt to increase the mixture of housing tenure types in the estate the Rathcoole Secondary site has now been redeveloped into privately owned housing.

State controlled sector education is now the only form of education facility in the estate with the three primary schools still going strong whilst secondary education was concentrated on the old Hopefield site, remodelled and extended as Newtownabbey Community High School until it closed in 2017 as part of a merger with Monkstown Community School to form Abbey Community College at the Monkstown site. Children requiring grammar school education need to travel further to facilities such as Belfast High School, Belfast Royal Academy, Ballyclare High School and Carrickfergus Grammar School.

== Politics ==
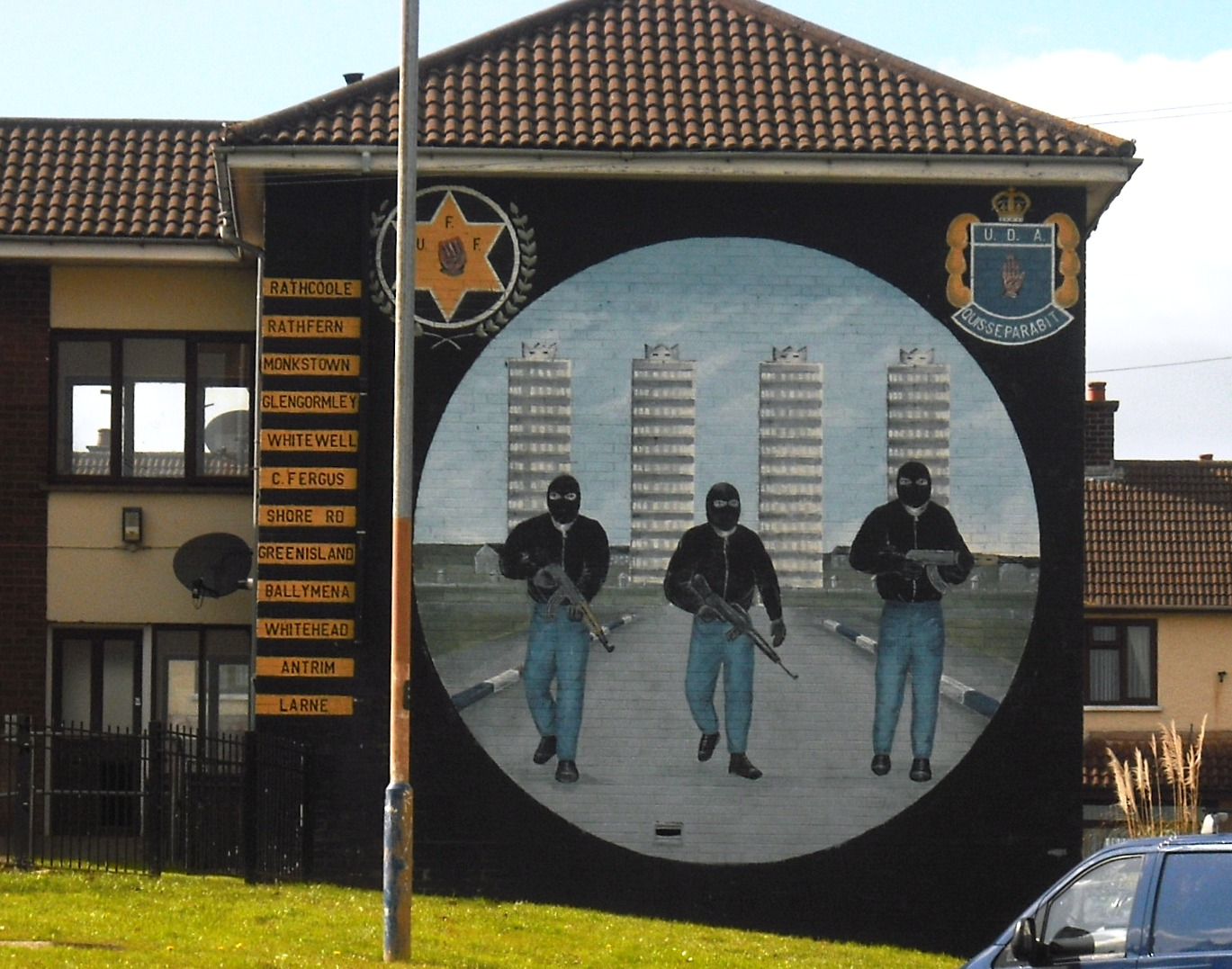
A UDA South East Antrim Brigade mural in Rathcoole that was later replaced with a mural of Queen Elizabeth II

The dominant political tradition in the area is Unionism with strong showing in successive elections by the Democratic Unionist Party and the Ulster Unionist Party. Alongside mainstream Unionists many independent Unionist and Loyalist politicians have represented the area at all levels of local government. In the aftermath of the Good Friday Agreement parties associated with Loyalist paramilitary groupings such as the Progressive Unionist Party (PUP) and the Ulster Democratic Party (UDP) enjoyed some success in the area with the PUP's more left wing working class analysis appealing to the area's largely working class population.

Alongside loyalism, the estate also had a long Labour tradition. Between 1973 and 2001, the area returned at least one Labour councillor in every local government election. This party was refused affiliation by the British Labour Party, which instead maintained its endorsement of the Social Democratic Labour Party (SDLP) in Northern Ireland.

During the 1990s, with hopes for change in the political climate in Northern Ireland and the signing of the Good Friday Agreement, change was also apparent in the estate. Funded by investment from the New Labour UK government, the Northern Ireland Housing Executive demolished some of its housing stock in the area including the hastily built 'banana flats' (maisonette style housing) which was afflicted with many of the sort of structural and social problems associated with high density community living commonplace in Glasgow's infamous tenements. They also renovated some of its out of date housing, providing items now taken for granted such as gas heating. The Diamond shopping area was extensively remodelled, creating more open space. New football pitches and changing areas were provided, and opened by The Princess Anne.

Past UDA brigadiers in the area have included Joe English and John "Grugg" Gregg.

== Sport ==
Rathfern Rangers of the Northern Amateur Football League play their home games at the Diamond on Ardmillan Drive in Rathcoole. Rathcoole F.C. of the Ballymena & Provincial League also play at the ground, which features two pitches. The 1st Newtownabbey Linfield Supporters Club is also based on the estate for fans of the IFA Premiership club.

The Valley Leisure Centre was opened in 1977, followed by an astroturf in 1991.

== Notable people ==
- John Anderson, composer, spent his childhood living in Rathcoole.
- Jonny Evans, Northern Ireland international and Manchester United footballer, lived in Rathcoole along with his brother, Corry Evans of Sunderland
- Billy Hamilton, former Northern Ireland national football team footballer
- Alan McDonald, ex-Northern Ireland national football team and Queen's Park Rangers F.C. (QPR) footballer, was born in Rathcoole.
- Jimmy Nicholl, ex-Northern Ireland international and Manchester United footballer, lived at Drumcor Green and attended Rathcoole Secondary School
- Bobby Sands, Provisional IRA hunger striker, lived in Rathcoole.
