= Ballard, Portloman =

Ballard
- Townland
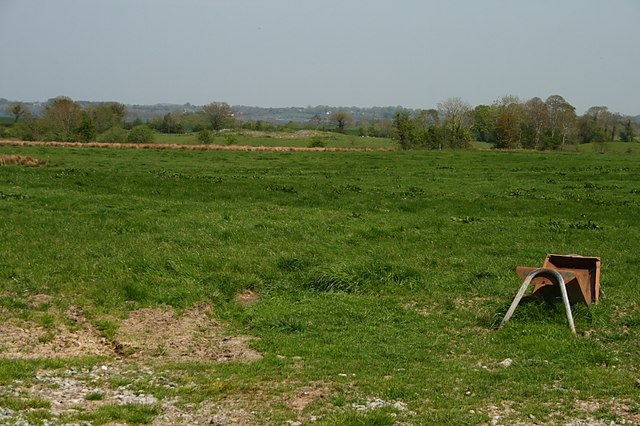
- Looking across fields in Ballard towards Lough Owel

- Location of Ballard within County Westmeath in the Republic of Ireland
- Coordinates: 53°33′13″N 7°24′20″W
- Country: Ireland
- Province: Leinster
- County: County Westmeath
- Irish grid reference: N394561

Ballard is a townland in County Westmeath, Ireland. It is located about 5.15 kilometres (3 mi) north–west of Mullingar.

Ballard is one of 8 townlands of the civil parish of Portloman in the barony of Corkaree in the Province of Leinster. The townland covers 440.34 acres (1.7820 km^{2}). The neighbouring townlands are: Portloman to the north, Tullaghan to the east and south, Walshestown North to the south, Ballyboy to the west and Lugnagullagh and Scurlockstown to the north–west. The north–eastern boundary of the townland is formed by the shoreline of Lough Owel and the small island of Browns or Grania's Island.

In the 1911 census of Ireland there were 5 houses and 23 inhabitants in the townland.
