= Martinstown, Stonehall =

Martinstown
- Townland
- Location of Martinstown within County Westmeath in the Republic of Ireland
- Coordinates: 53°36′19″N 7°18′31″W
- Country: Ireland
- Province: Leinster
- County: County Westmeath
- Irish grid reference: N458619

Martinstown is a townland in County Westmeath, Ireland. It is located about 9.24 kilometres (6 mi) north of Mullingar.

Martinstown is one of 11 townlands of the civil parish of Stonehall in the barony of Corkaree in the Province of Leinster. The townland covers 538.33 acres (2.1785 km^{2}).

The neighbouring townlands are: Knockbody to the north, Farrancallin and Taghmon to the east, Sheefin to the south–east, Parsonstown to the south, Galmoylestown Upper to the south–west and Blackmiles to the north–west.

In the 1911 census of Ireland, there were 11 houses and 57 inhabitants in the townland.
