= Stonehall, County Westmeath =

Stonehall Tigh Cloiche
- Townland
- Location of Stonehall within County Westmeath in the Republic of Ireland
- Coordinates: 53°37′1″N 7°20′43″W
- Country: Ireland
- Province: Leinster
- County: County Westmeath
- Irish grid reference: N433631

Stonehall (Irish: Tigh Cloiche) is a townland in County Westmeath, Ireland. It is located about 10.23 kilometres (6 mi) north of Mullingar. It contains the eastern part of the small lake, Lough Patrick, the remainder being in Killintown.

Stonehall is one of 11 townlands of the civil parish of Stonehall in the barony of Corkaree in the Province of Leinster. The townland covers 386.37 acres (1.5636 km^{2}).

The neighbouring townlands are: Ballinriddera and Monintown to the north, Blackmiles and Knockbody to the east, Larkinstown to the south and Killintown to the west.

In the 1911 census of Ireland there were 9 houses and 47 inhabitants in the townland.
