= Killintown =

Townland in County Westmeath, Ireland

- Townland
- Location of Killintown within County Westmeath in the Republic of Ireland
- Coordinates: 53°37′11″N 7°21′36″W
- Country: Ireland
- Province: Leinster
- County: County Westmeath
- Irish grid reference: N423634

Killintown is a townland in County Westmeath, Ireland. It is about 11 kilometres (7 mi) north of Mullingar. It contains the western part of the small lake, Lough Patrick, the remainder being in Stonehall.

Killintown is one of 11 townlands of the civil parish of Stonehall in the barony of Corkaree in the Province of Leinster. The townland covers 232 acres (0.94 km^{2}).

The neighbouring townlands are: Lismalady and Ballinriddera to the north, Stonehall to the east, Larkinstown and Tyfarnham to the south and Multyfarnham or Fearbranagh to the west.

In the 1911 census of Ireland there were 3 houses and 12 inhabitants in the townland.
