= Blackmiles =

- Townland
- Location of Blackmiles within County Westmeath in the Republic of Ireland
- Coordinates: 53°36′45″N 7°19′46″W
- Country: Ireland
- Province: Leinster
- County: County Westmeath

Area
  - Total: 0.62 km^{2} (0.24 sq mi)
- Irish grid reference: N444627

Blackmiles is a townland in County Westmeath, Ireland. It is located about 9.79 kilometres (6 mi) north of Mullingar.

Blackmiles is one of 11 townlands of the civil parish of Stonehall in the barony of Corkaree in the Province of Leinster. The townland covers 149.16 acres (0.6036 km^{2}).

The neighbouring townlands are: Knockbody to the north, Martinstown, County Westmeath to the south–east, Galmoylestown Lower to the south, Galmoylestown Upper to the south, Larkinstown to the south–west and Stonehall to the north–west.

In the 1911 census of Ireland there was 1 house and 4 inhabitants in the townland.
