= Slane More =

Slane More Sleamhain Mhór
- Townland
- Location of Slane More within County Westmeath in the Republic of Ireland
- Coordinates: 53°32′41″N 7°25′55″W
- Country: Ireland
- Province: Leinster
- County: County Westmeath
- Irish grid reference: N377551

Slane More (Irish: Sleamhain Mhór) is a townland in County Westmeath, Ireland. It is located about 6.19 kilometres (4 mi) west–north–west of Mullingar.

Slane More is one of 11 townlands of the civil parish of Dysart in the barony of Moyashel and Magheradernon in the Province of Leinster. The townland covers approximately 417.12 acres (1.69 km^{2}), including the small rural community of Slanemore. The neighbouring townlands are: Slane Beg to the north, Ballyboy to the north–east, Walshestown North and Walshestown South to the east, Slanestown and Clondardis to the south and Parcellstown to the west.

In the 1911 census of Ireland there were 4 houses and 20 inhabitants in the townland.
