= Scurlockstown, Portloman =

Scurlockstown
- Townland
- Location of Scurlockstown within County Westmeath in the Republic of Ireland
- Coordinates: 53°33′47″N 7°25′31″W
- Country: Ireland
- Province: Leinster
- County: County Westmeath
- Irish grid reference: N381571

Scurlockstown is a townland in County Westmeath, Ireland. It is located about 6.82 kilometres (4 mi) north–west of Mullingar.

Scurlockstown is one of 8 townlands of the civil parish of Portloman in the barony of Corkaree in the Province of Leinster. The townland covers 151 acres (0.61 km^{2}). The neighbouring townlands are: Monroe to the north, Portloman to the east, Ballard and Lugnagullagh to the south, Johnstown to the south–west and Monroe or Johnstown (Nugent) to the north–west.

In the 1911 census of Ireland there were 3 houses and 11 inhabitants in the townland.

There are other townlands with the name Scurlockstown, in County Meath, and County Westmeath.
