= Taghmon (civil parish) =

Civil parish in County Westmeath, Ireland

Taghmon Tigh Munna
- Civil parish
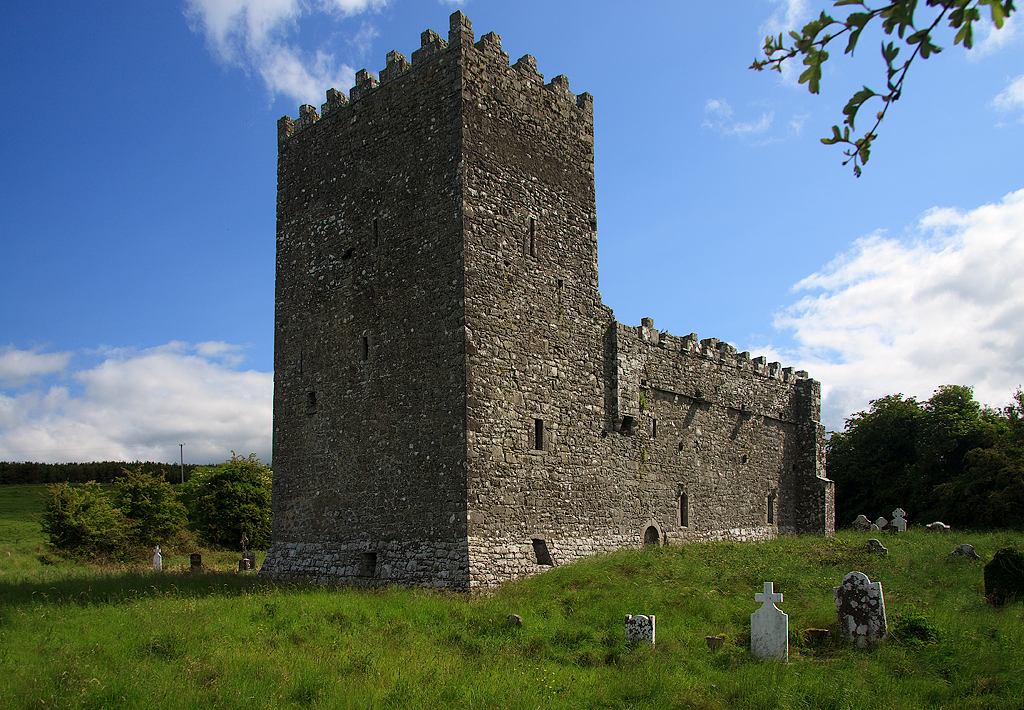
- St Munna's Church, Taghmon

- Location of Taghmon within County Westmeath in Ireland
- Coordinates: 53°35′36″N 7°16′14″W
- Country: Ireland
- Province: Leinster
- County: County Westmeath
- Irish grid reference: N485618

Taghmon (Irish: Tigh Munna) is a civil parish in County Westmeath, Ireland. It is located about 9 km (6 mi) north–east of Mullingar.

Taghmon is one of 8 civil parishes in the barony of Corkaree in the province of Leinster. The civil parish covers 3,450.2 acres (13.962 km^{2}).

Taghmon civil parish comprises 11 townlands: Downs, Farrancallin, Foxburrow, Glebe, Knockatee, Knockdrin, Monkstown, Rathcorbally, Sheefin, Taghmon and Toberaquill.

The neighbouring civil parishes are: Faughalstown (barony of Fore) and Kilkpatrick (Fore) to the north, Rathconnell (barony of Moyashel and Magheradernon) to the east and south and Stonehall and Tyfarnham to the west.
