= Grangegeeth, County Westmeath =

Grangegeeth
- Townland
- Location of Grangegeeth within County Westmeath in the Republic of Ireland
- Coordinates: 53°35′16″N 7°26′13″W
- Country: Ireland
- Province: Leinster
- County: County Westmeath
- Irish grid reference: N373598

Grangegeeth is a townland in County Westmeath, Ireland. It is located about 9.29 kilometres (6 mi) north–west of Mullingar.

Grangegeeth is one of 8 townlands of the civil parish of Portloman in the barony of Corkaree in the Province of Leinster. The townland covers 150 acres (0.61 km^{2}). The neighbouring townlands are: Mountmurray to the north, Balrath to the south, Piercefield or Templeoran to the south–west and Piercefield to the north–west. The western boundary of the townland is formed by the L1804 local primary road.

In the 1911 census of Ireland there were 4 houses and 12 inhabitants in the townland.
