= Down, County Westmeath =

Down
- Townland
- Location of Down within County Westmeath in the Republic of Ireland
- Coordinates: 53°35′54″N 7°21′3″W
- Country: Ireland
- Province: Leinster
- County: County Westmeath
- Irish grid reference: N430611

Down is a townland in County Westmeath, Ireland. It is located about 8.17 kilometres (5 mi) north of Mullingar.

Down is one of 11 townlands of the civil parish of Tyfarnham in the barony of Corkaree in the Province of Leinster. The townland covers 181 acres (0.73 km^{2}). The River Gaine, forming the eastern boundary of the townland, is a tributary of the River Inny.

The neighbouring townlands are: Tyfarnham to the north, Galmoylestown Lower to the east, Garrysallagh and Loughanstown to the south and Knightswood and Rathlevanagh to the west.

In the 1911 census of Ireland there was 1 house and 3 inhabitants in the townland.
