= Walshestown North =

- Townland
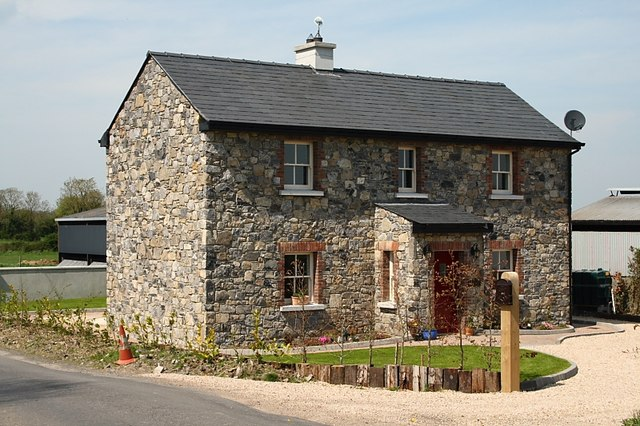
- Stone house in Walshestown North

- Location of Walshestown North within County Westmeath in the Republic of Ireland
- Coordinates: 53°32′42″N 7°24′21″W
- Country: Ireland
- Province: Leinster
- County: County Westmeath
- Irish grid reference: N394551

Walshestown North is a townland in County Westmeath, Ireland. It is located about 4.64 kilometres (3 mi) west–north–west of Mullingar.

Walshestown North is one of 64 townlands of the civil parish of Mullingar in the barony of Moyashel and Magheradernon in the Province of Leinster. The townland covers 333.28 acres (1.3487 km^{2}). The neighbouring townlands are: Ballard to the north, Tullaghan to the east, Walshestown South to the south, Slane More to the west and Ballyboy to the north–west. The Ordnance Survey map, produced at the time of the Griffith's Valuation survey of Ireland (completed in 1869), shows a small triangular parcel of Walshestown North land, about 20 acres (0.081 km^{2}), detached from the main townland and situated between the neighbouring townlands of Walshestown South and Irishtown.

In the 1911 census of Ireland there were 11 houses and 52 inhabitants in the townland.
