= Monintown =

- Townland
- Location of Monintown within County Westmeath in the Republic of Ireland
- Coordinates: 53°37′33″N 7°19′51″W
- Country: Ireland
- Province: Leinster
- County: County Westmeath
- Irish grid reference: N443641

Monintown is a townland in County Westmeath, Ireland. It is located about 11.26 kilometres (7 mi) north of Mullingar.

Monintown spans the border of two civil parishes. It is one of 14 townlands of the civil parish of Multyfarnham and 11 townlands of the civil parish of Stonehall both in the barony of Corkaree in the Province of Leinster. The townland covers a total of about 541 acres (2.19 km^{2}); 425 acres (1.72 km^{2}) of Multyfarnham and 116 acres (0.47 km^{2}) of Stonehall.

The neighbouring townlands are: Ballinriddera to the north–west and Knockbody and Stonehall to the south.

In the 1911 census of Ireland there were 7 houses and 34 inhabitants in the townland. The 2011 census recorded 19 inhabitants.
