= Monroe, County Westmeath =

Monroe
- Townland
- Location of Monroe within County Westmeath in the Republic of Ireland
- Coordinates: 53°34′12″N 7°25′43″W
- Country: Ireland
- Province: Leinster
- County: County Westmeath
- Irish grid reference: N378579

Monroe is a townland in County Westmeath, Ireland. It is located about 7.49 kilometres (5 mi) north–west of Mullingar.

Monroe is one of 8 townlands of the civil parish of Portloman in the barony of Corkaree in the Province of Leinster. The townland covers 167 acres (0.68 km^{2}). The neighbouring townlands are: Wattstown to the north, Portloman to the east, Scurlockstown to the south, Monroe or Johnstown (Nugent) to the west and Johnstown to the north–west.

In the 1911 census of Ireland there were 3 houses and 11 inhabitants in the townland.
