= Ballyedward, County Westmeath =

Ballyedward
- Townland
- Location of Ballyedward within County Westmeath in the Republic of Ireland
- Coordinates: 53°36′32″N 7°21′40″W
- Country: Ireland
- Province: Leinster
- County: County Westmeath
- Irish grid reference: N369589

Ballyedward is a townland in County Westmeath, Ireland. It is located about 8.88 kilometres (6 mi) north–west of Mullingar.

Ballyedward is one of 11 townlands of the civil parish of Tyfarnham in the barony of Corkaree in the Province of Leinster. The townland covers 47.71 acres (0.1931 km^{2}).

The neighbouring townlands are: Piercefield (or Templeoran) to the north, Balrath to the north–east, Wattstown to the east and Johnstown to the south and south–west.

In the 1911 census of Ireland there was 1 house and 5 inhabitants in the townland.
