= Foxburrow, County Westmeath =

Foxburrow
- Townland
- Location of Foxburrow within County Westmeath in the Republic of Ireland
- Coordinates: 53°36′4″N 7°15′21″W
- Country: Ireland
- Province: Leinster
- County: County Westmeath
- Irish grid reference: N493614

Foxburrow is a townland in County Westmeath, Ireland. It is located about 10.29 kilometres (6 mi) north–north–east of Mullingar.

Foxburrow is one of 11 townlands of the civil parish of Taghmon in the barony of Corkaree in the Province of Leinster. The townland covers approximately 65.03 acres (0.2632 km^{2}).

The neighbouring townlands are: Taghmon to the north and east and Glebe to the south.
