= Parsonstown, County Westmeath =

Parsonstown
- Townland
- Location of Parsonstown within County Westmeath in the Republic of Ireland
- Coordinates: 53°35′24″N 7°18′14″W
- Country: Ireland
- Province: Leinster
- County: County Westmeath
- Irish grid reference: N461602

Parsonstown is a townland in County Westmeath, Ireland. It is located about 7.71 kilometres (5 mi) north–north–east of Mullingar.

Parsonstown is one of 11 townlands of the civil parish of Tyfarnham in the barony of Corkaree in the Province of Leinster. The townland covers 412.39 acres (1.6689 km^{2}).

The neighbouring townlands are: Martinstown to the north, Sheefin to the north–east, Knockatee to the south–east, Garraree to the south, Kilmaglish to the south–west and Galmoylestown Upper to the north–west.

In the 1911 census of Ireland there were 13 houses and 56 inhabitants in the townland.
