= Monroe or Johnstown (Nugent) =

- Townland
- Location of Monroe or Johnstown (Nugent) within County Westmeath in the Republic of Ireland
- Coordinates: 53°34′5″N 7°26′9″W
- Country: Ireland
- Province: Leinster
- County: County Westmeath
- Irish grid reference: N374576

Monroe or Johnstown (Nugent) is a townland in County Westmeath, Ireland. It is located about 7.71 kilometres (5 mi) north‑west of Mullingar.

Monroe or Johnstown (Nugent) is one of 12 townlands of the civil parish of Templeoran in the barony of Moygoish in the Province of Leinster. The townland covers 114.22 acres (0.4622 km^{2}).

The neighbouring townlands are: Johnstown to the north, west and south, Wattstown to the north–east, Monroe to the east and Scurlockstown to the south–east.

In the 1911 census of Ireland there were 3 houses and 12 inhabitants in the townland.
