= Sheefin =

- Townland
- Location of Sheefin within County Westmeath in the Republic of Ireland
- Coordinates: 53°35′34″N 7°17′24″W
- Country: Ireland
- Province: Leinster
- County: County Westmeath
- Irish grid reference: N470605

Sheefin is a townland in County Westmeath, Ireland. It is located about 8.36 kilometres (5 mi) north–north–east of Mullingar.

Sheefin is one of 11 townlands of the civil parish of Taghmon in the barony of Corkaree in the Province of Leinster. The townland covers 294.11 acres (1.1902 km^{2}).

The neighbouring townlands are:Farrancallin to the north, Monkstown to the east, Knockatee to the south, Parsonstown to the south and west and Martinstown to the north–west.

In the 1911 census of Ireland there were 6 houses and 20 inhabitants in the townland.
