= Toberaquill =

Townland in County Westmeath, Ireland

- Townland
- Location of Toberaquill within County Westmeath in the Republic of Ireland
- Coordinates: 53°34′40″N 7°16′47″W
- Country: Ireland
- Province: Leinster
- County: County Westmeath
- Irish grid reference: N477588

Toberaquill is a townland in County Westmeath, Ireland. It is about 7 kilometres (4 mi) north–east of Mullingar.

Toberaquill is one of 11 townlands of the civil parish of Taghmon in the barony of Corkaree in the Province of Leinster. The townland covers 363.81 acres (1.4723 km^{2}).

The neighbouring townlands are: Monkstown to the north, Clonkill to the east, Loughagar More to the south–east, Brittas to the south, Knockdrin to the south–west and Knockatee to the west and north–west.

In the 1911 census of Ireland there were 9 houses and 44 inhabitants in the townland.
