= Farrancallin =

- Townland
- Location of Farrancallin within County Westmeath in the Republic of Ireland
- Coordinates: 53°35′55″N 7°16′59″W
- Country: Ireland
- Province: Leinster
- County: County Westmeath
- Irish grid reference: N475611

Farrancallin is a townland in County Westmeath, Ireland. It is located about 9.14 kilometres (6 mi) north–north–east of Mullingar.

Farrancallin is one of 11 townlands of the civil parish of Taghmon in the barony of Corkaree in the Province of Leinster. The townland covers 228.96 acres (0.9266 km^{2}).

The neighbouring townlands are: Taghmon to the north and east, Monkstown to the south–east, Sheefin to the south–west and Martinstown to the west.

In the 1911 census of Ireland there were 7 houses and 24 inhabitants in the townland.
