= Downs (townland, County Westmeath) =

- Townland
- Location of Downs within County Westmeath in the Republic of Ireland
- Coordinates: 53°35′12″N 7°15′10″W
- Country: Ireland
- Province: Leinster
- County: County Westmeath

Area
  - Total: 0.73 km^{2} (0.28 sq mi)
- Irish grid reference: N495598

Downs is a townland in County Westmeath, Ireland. It is located about 10 kilometres (6 mi) north–east of Mullingar, and has an area of approximately 0.73 square kilometres (180.4 acres).

Downs is one of nine townlands in the civil parish of Taghmon in the barony of Corkaree. The modern–day rural community of The Downs is 7.89 kilometres (5 mi) south of this townland and is not to be confused with it.

The neighbouring townlands are: Rathcorbally to the north, Balreagh to the east and south, Clonkill to the south and Monkstown to the west.

In the 1911 census of Ireland there were 5 houses and 26 inhabitants in the townland. As of the 2011 census, Downs townland had a population of 12 people in 5 houses.
