= Taghmon (townland, County Westmeath) =

Taghmon Tigh Munna
- Townland
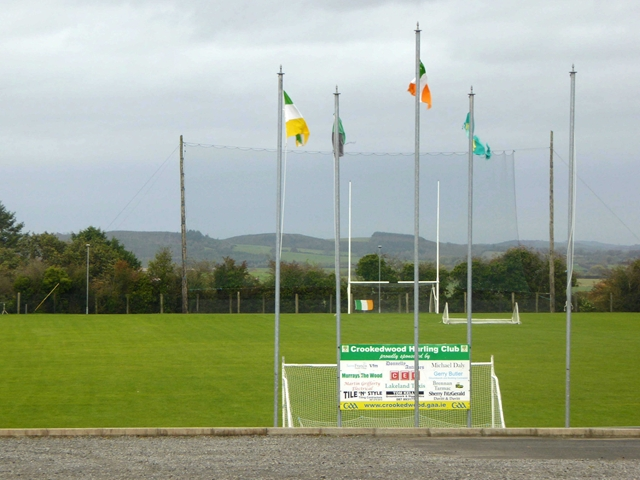
- Crookedwood Hurling Club grounds are located within Taghmon townland

- Location of Taghmon within County Westmeath in the Republic of Ireland
- Coordinates: 53°36′14″N 7°15′41″W
- Country: Ireland
- Province: Leinster
- County: County Westmeath
- Irish grid reference: N489617

Taghmon (Irish: Tigh Munna) is a townland in County Westmeath, Ireland. It is located about 10.35 kilometres (6 mi) north–north–east of Mullingar.

Taghmon is one of 11 townlands of the civil parish of Taghmon in the barony of Corkaree in the Province of Leinster. The townland covers 1,122.96 acres (4.5445 km^{2}) and contains the small village of Crookedwood.

The neighbouring townlands are: Gartlandstown to the north, Tuitestown to the north, Clondalever (Kilpatrick) to the north, Clondalever (Taghmon) to the east, Balreagh to the south-east, Rathcorbally to the south, Foxburrow to the south, Glebe to the south, Monkstown to the south, Farrancallin to the south and Martinstown to the west.

In the 1911 census of Ireland there were 22 houses and 76 inhabitants in the townland.
