= Lugnagullagh =

- Townland
- Location of Lugnagullagh within County Westmeath in the Republic of Ireland
- Coordinates: 53°33′27″N 7°25′24″W
- Country: Ireland
- Province: Leinster
- County: County Westmeath
- Irish grid reference: N382565

Lugnagullagh is a townland in County Westmeath, Ireland. It is located about 635 kilometres (395 mi) north–west of Mullingar.

Lugnagullagh is one of 11 townlands of the civil parish of Tyfarnham in the barony of Corkaree in the Province of Leinster. The townland covers 69.39 acres (0.2808 km^{2}).

The neighbouring townlands are: Scurlockstown to the north and east, Ballard to the south–east, Ballyboy to the south, Slane Beg to the west and Johnstown to the north–west.

In the 1911 census of Ireland there were 2 houses and 6 inhabitants in the townland.
