= Ballyboy, County Westmeath =

Ballyboy
- Townland
- Location of Ballyboy within County Westmeath in the Republic of Ireland
- Coordinates: 53°33′5″N 7°25′22″W
- Country: Ireland
- Province: Leinster
- County: County Westmeath
- Irish grid reference: N383558

Ballyboy is a townland in County Westmeath, Ireland. It is located about 5.96 kilometres (4 mi) north–west of Mullingar.

Ballyboy is one of 8 townlands of the civil parish of Portloman in the barony of Corkaree in the Province of Leinster. The townland covers 143.13 acres (0.5792 km^{2}). The neighbouring townlands are: Lugnagullagh to the north, Ballard to the east, Walshestown North to the south–east, Slane More to the south–west and Slane Beg to the west.

In the 1911 census of Ireland there were 2 houses and 10 inhabitants in the townland.
