= Johnstown, Templeoran =

Johnstown
- Townland
- Location of Johnstown within County Westmeath in the Republic of Ireland
- Coordinates: 53°34′5″N 7°26′9″W
- Country: Ireland
- Province: Leinster
- County: County Westmeath
- Irish grid reference: N365575

Johnstown is a townland in County Westmeath, Ireland. It is located about 8.3 kilometres (5 mi) north‑west of Mullingar.

Johnstown is one of 12 townlands of the civil parish of Templeoran in the barony of Moygoish in the Province of Leinster. The townland covers 936.42 acres (3.7896 km^{2}).

The neighbouring townlands are: Ballyedward to the north, Wattstown to the north–east, Monroe to the north–east, Monroe or Johnstown (Nugent) to the east, Scurlockstown and Lugnagullagh to the south–east, Slane Beg to the south, Sonna Demesne to the west and Piercefield or Templeoran to the north–east.

In the 1911 census of Ireland there were 18 houses and 74 inhabitants in the townland.
