= Rathcorbally =

- Townland
- Location of Rathcorbally within County Westmeath in the Republic of Ireland
- Coordinates: 53°35′35″N 7°14′54″W
- Country: Ireland
- Province: Leinster
- County: County Westmeath
- Irish grid reference: N498605

Rathcorbally is a townland in County Westmeath, Ireland. It is located about 9.88 kilometres (6 mi) north–east of Mullingar.

Rathcorbally is one of 11 townlands of the civil parish of Taghmon in the barony of Corkaree in the Province of Leinster. The townland covers 175 acres (0.71 km^{2}).

The neighbouring townlands are: Taghmon to the north, Balreagh to the east, Downs to the south, Monkstown to the west and Glebe to the north–west.

In the 1911 census of Ireland there were 6 houses and 23 inhabitants in the townland.
