= Knockbody =

Knockbody Cnoc an Bhodaigh
- Townland
- Location of Knockbody within County Westmeath in the Republic of Ireland
- Coordinates: 53°37′1″N 7°19′8″W
- Country: Ireland
- Province: Leinster
- County: County Westmeath
- Irish grid reference: N451632

Knockbody (Irish: Cnoc an Bhodaigh, meaning 'the hill of the low-bred person') is a townland in County Westmeath, Ireland. It is located about 10.37 kilometres (6 mi) north of Mullingar.

Knockbody is one of 11 townlands of the civil parish of Stonehall in the barony of Corkaree in the Province of Leinster. The townland covers 350.44 acres (1.4182 km^{2}).

The neighbouring townlands are: Monintown to the north, Martinstown to the south, Blackmiles to the south–west and Stonehall to the west. Knockbody borders the southern end of Lough Derravaragh.

In the 1911 census of Ireland there were 3 houses and 22 inhabitants in the townland.
