= Kilmaglish =

- Townland
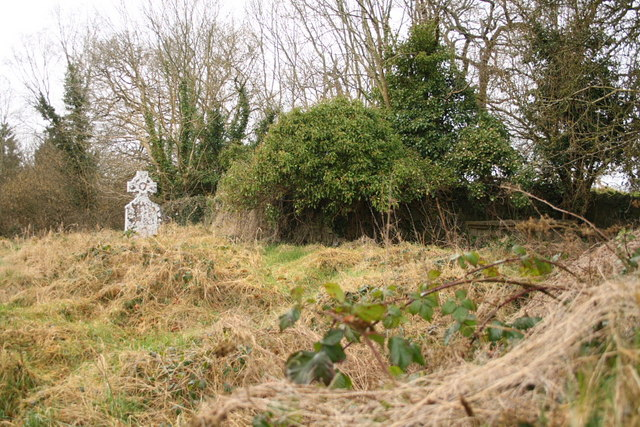
- Overgrown church ruin in Kilmaglish

- Location of Kilmaglish within County Westmeath in the Republic of Ireland
- Coordinates: 53°35′9″N 7°19′26″W
- Country: Ireland
- Province: Leinster
- County: County Westmeath
- Irish grid reference: N448597

Kilmaglish is a townland in County Westmeath, Ireland. It is located about 6.91 kilometres (4 mi) north of Mullingar.

Kilmaglish is one of 11 townlands of the civil parish of Tyfarnham in the barony of Corkaree in the Province of Leinster. The townland covers 517.59 acres (2.0946 km^{2}).

The neighbouring townlands are: Galmoylestown Upper to the north, Parsonstown to the north–east, Garraree to the east, Knockdrin to the south–east, Ballynagall to the south, Knockdrin Demesne to the south and Garrysallagh to the north–east.

In the 1911 census of Ireland there were 4 houses and 17 inhabitants in the townland.
