= Tyfarnham (civil parish) =

Civil parish in County Westmeath, Ireland

Tyfarnham Tigh Farannáin
- Civil parish
- Location of Tyfarnham within County Westmeath, Ireland
- Coordinates: 53°35′33″N 7°20′15″W
- Country: Ireland
- Province: Leinster
- County: County Westmeath
- Irish grid reference: N439605

Tyfarnham (Irish: Tigh Farannáin) is a civil parish in County Westmeath, Ireland. It is located about 8 km (5 mi) north of Mullingar.

One of 8 civil parishes in the barony of Corkaree in the province of Leinster, the civil parish covers 1,847.2 acres (7.475 km^{2}).

Tyfarnham civil parish comprises 11 townlands: Ballyedward, Ballynagall, Down, Garraree, Kilmaglish, Knockatee, Knockdrin, Lugnagullagh, Multyfarnham or Fearbranagh, Parsonstown and Tyfarnham. The major part of Tyfarnham is split into two parts by Stonehall civil parish but also has two isolated townlands south of Lough Owel, Ballyedward and Lugnagullah.

The neighbouring civil parishes are: Stonehall to the north, Taghmon to the east, Leny, Portnashangan and Rathconnell (barony of Moyashel and Magheradernon) to the south, and Multyfarnham to the west. This excludes neighbours of Ballyedward and Lugnagullah.
