= Ballinriddera =

Townland in County Westmeath, Ireland

- Townland
- Location of Ballinriddera within County Westmeath in the Republic of Ireland
- Coordinates: 53°37′51″N 7°20′49″W
- Country: Ireland
- Province: Leinster
- County: County Westmeath
- Irish grid reference: N432647

Ballinriddera is a townland in County Westmeath, Ireland, 12 km (7 mi) north of Mullingar.

Ballinriddera is one of 14 townlands of the civil parish of Multyfarnham in the barony of Corkaree in the Province of Leinster. The townland covers 368.49 acres (1.4912 km^{2}).

The neighbouring townlands are: Monintown to the east, Killintown and Stonehall to the south, Ballinphort and Lismalady to the west.

In the 1911 census of Ireland there were 5 houses and 28 inhabitants in the townland.
