= Stonehall (civil parish) =

Civil parish in County Westmeath, Ireland

Stonehall Tigh Cloiche
- Civil parish
- Location of Stonehall within County Westmeath, Ireland
- Coordinates: 53°36′37″N 7°19′51″W
- Country: Ireland
- Province: Leinster
- County: County Westmeath
- Irish grid reference: N443625

Stonehall (Irish: Tigh Cloiche) is a civil parish in County Westmeath, Ireland. It is located about 10 km (6 mi) north of Mullingar. This name also applies to the townland of Stonehall.

Stonehall is one of 8 civil parishes in the barony of Corkaree in the province of Leinster. The civil parish covers 3,183.1 acres (12.882 km^{2}).

Stonehall civil parish comprises 11 townlands: Blackmiles, Galmoylestown Lower, Galmoylestown Upper, Garrysallagh, Killintown, Knockbody, Larkinstown, Martinstown, Monintown, Multyfarnham or Fearbranagh and Stonehall.

The neighbouring civil parishes are: Faughalstown to the north, Taghmon to the east, Tyfarnham to the south and Multyfarnham to the west and north.
