= Portloman (civil parish) =

Civil parish in County Westmeath, Ireland

Portloman Port Lomáin
- Civil parish
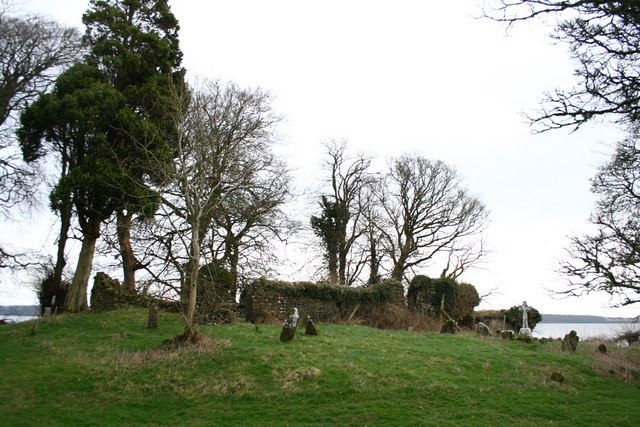
- Church ruin and graveyard in the eponymous townland

- Location of Portloman within County Westmeath in Ireland
- Coordinates: 53°34′4″N 7°24′52″W
- Country: Ireland
- Province: Leinster
- County: County Westmeath
- Irish grid reference: N388577

Portloman (Irish: Port Lomáin) is a civil parish in County Westmeath, Ireland. It is located about 6.5 km (4 mi) north–west of Mullingar in hilly country on the western shore of Lough Owel.

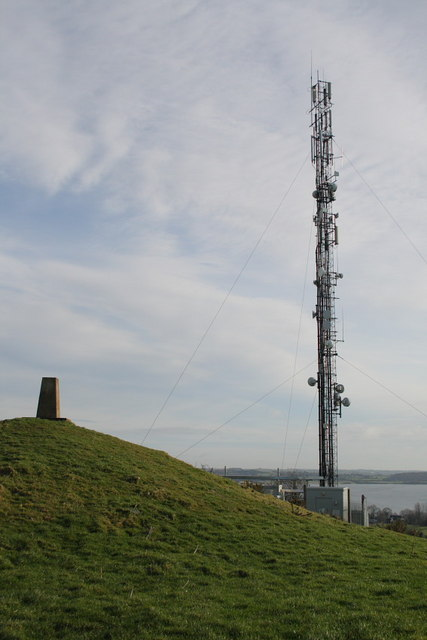
Communication mast and trigonometric point on Frewin Hill in Portloman parish

Portloman is one of 8 civil parishes in the barony of Corkaree in the province of Leinster. The civil parish covers 2,595.8 acres (10.505 km^{2}).

Portloman civil parish comprises 8 townlands: Ballard, Ballyboy, Balrath, Grangegeeth, Monroe, Portloman, Scurlockstown and Wattstown.

The neighbouring civil parishes are: Portnashangan to the north, Rathconnell (barony of Moyashel and Magheradernon) to the east, Templeoran (barony of Moygoish) to the south and west.
