= Glebe, Taghmon =

Glebe
- Townland
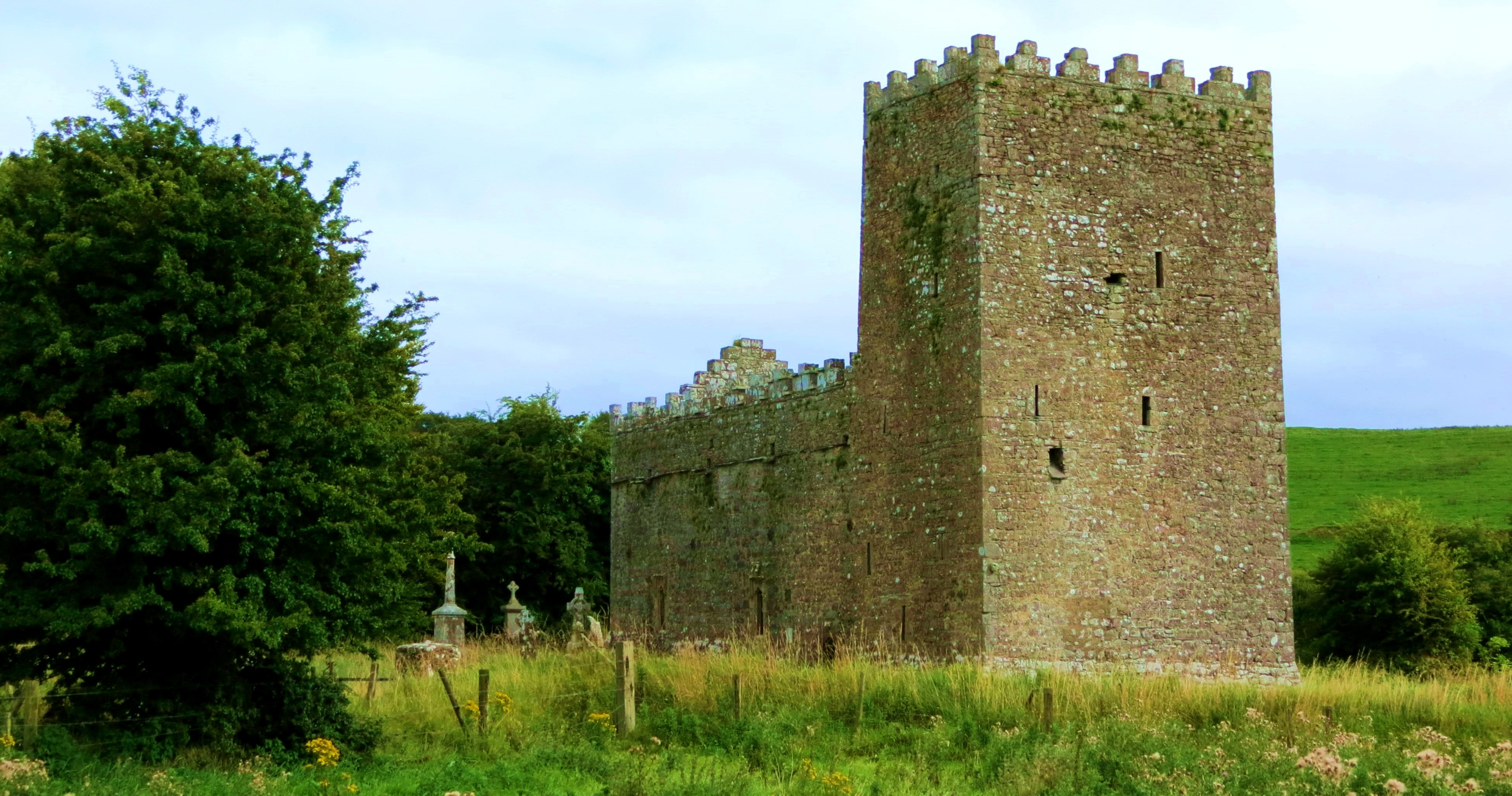
- St. Munnas Church

- Location of Glebe within County Westmeath in the Republic of Ireland
- Coordinates: 53°35′55″N 7°15′33″W
- Country: Ireland
- Province: Leinster
- County: County Westmeath
- Irish grid reference: N490612

Glebe is a townland in County Westmeath, Ireland. It is located about 9.94 kilometres (6 mi) north–north–east of Mullingar.

Glebe is one of 11 townlands of the civil parish of Taghmon in the barony of Corkaree in the Province of Leinster. The townland covers 74.02 acres (0.2995 km^{2}).

The neighbouring townlands are: Foxburrow to the north, Taghmon to the south–east, Rathcorbally and Monkstown to the south and Taghmon to the east and north.

In the 1911 census of Ireland there were 2 houses and 15 inhabitants in the townland.

Glebe was the name given to an area of land within an ecclesiastical parish used to support a parish priest. As a townland name it is repeated many times across the country.
