= Garraree =

- Townland
- Location of Garraree within County Westmeath in the Republic of Ireland
- Coordinates: 53°34′58″N 7°18′32″W
- Country: Ireland
- Province: Leinster
- County: County Westmeath
- Irish grid reference: N458594

Garraree is a townland in County Westmeath, Ireland. It is located about 6.85 kilometres (4 mi) north–north–east of Mullingar.

Garraree is one of 11 townlands of the civil parish of Tyfarnham in the barony of Corkaree in the Province of Leinster. The townland covers 87.75 acres (0.3551 km^{2}).

The neighbouring townlands are: Parsonstown to the north, Knockatee to the east, Knockdrin to the south and Kilmaglish to the west.

In the 1911 census of Ireland there were 2 houses and 8 inhabitants in the townland.
