= Slane Beg =

- Townland
- Location of Slane Beg within County Westmeath in the Republic of Ireland
- Coordinates: 53°33′19″N 7°26′40″W
- Country: Ireland
- Province: Leinster
- County: County Westmeath
- Irish grid reference: N368562

Slane Beg is a townland in County Westmeath, Ireland. It is located about 7.43 kilometres (5 mi) north–west of Mullingar.

Slane Beg is one of 11 townlands of the civil parish of Dysart in the barony of Moyashel and Magheradernon in the Province of Leinster. The townland covers 310.96 acres (1.2584 km^{2}). The neighbouring townlands are: Johnstown to the north, Lugnagullagh and Ballyboy to the east, Slane More and Parcellstown to the south, Kildallan to the west and Sonna Demesne to the north–west.

In the 1911 census of Ireland there were 8 houses and 29 inhabitants in the townland.
