= Knockatee =

- Townland
- Location of Knockatee within County Westmeath in the Republic of Ireland
- Coordinates: 53°34′51″N 7°17′37″W
- Country: Ireland
- Province: Leinster
- County: County Westmeath
- Irish grid reference: N468592

Knockatee is a townland in County Westmeath, Ireland. It is located about 7.06 kilometres (4 mi) north of Mullingar.

Knockatee spans the civil parishes of Taghmon and Tyfarnham. It is one of the 11 townlands in Taghmon and one of the 11 townlands in Tyfarnham, both in the barony of Corkaree in the Province of Leinster. The townland covers approximately 289 acres (1.17 km^{2}) in Taghmon and 7 acres (0.028 km^{2}) in Tyfarnham, a total of 296.44 acres (1.1997 km^{2}).

The neighbouring townlands are: Parsonstown and Sheefin to the north, Monkstown and Toberaquill to the east, Knockdrin to the south and Garraree to the west.

In the 1911 census of Ireland there were 12 houses and 62 inhabitants in the townland.
