= Tyfarnham =

Tyfarnham Tigh Farannáin
- Townland
- Location of Tyfarnham within County Westmeath in the Republic of Ireland
- Coordinates: 53°36′32″N 7°21′40″W
- Country: Ireland
- Province: Leinster
- County: County Westmeath
- Irish grid reference: N423622

Tyfarnham (Irish: Tigh Farannáin) is a townland in County Westmeath, Ireland. It is located about 9.4 kilometres (6 mi) north of Mullingar.

Tyfarnham is one of 11 townlands of the civil parish of Tyfarnham in the barony of Corkaree in the Province of Leinster. The townland covers 313.2 acres (1.267 km^{2}).

The neighbouring townlands are: Killintown to the north, Larkinstown to the east, Galmoylestown Lower to the south–east, Down to the south, Knightswood to the south–west, Culleenabohoge to the west and Multyfarnham or Fearbranagh to the north–west.

In the 1911 census of Ireland there was 1 house and 3 inhabitants in the townland.
