= Piercefield, County Westmeath =

Piercefield Baile Phiarais
- Townland
- Location of Kilpatrick within County Westmeath in the Republic of Ireland
- Coordinates: 53°35′33″N 7°26′59″W
- Country: Ireland
- Province: Leinster
- County: County Westmeath
- Irish grid reference: N365604

Piercefield (Irish: Baile Phiarais) is a townland in County Westmeath, Ireland. It is located about 10 kilometres (6 mi) north–west of Mullingar. The name Piercefield also applies to the neighbouring townland of Piercefield (or Templeoran).

Piercefield is one of 8 townlands of the civil parish of Portnashangan, in the barony of Corkaree in the Province of Leinster. The townland covers 255 acres (1.03 km^{2}). The neighbouring townlands are: Farrow and Rathbennett to the north, Grangegeeth and Mountmurray to the east and Piercefield (or Templeoran) to the south.

In the 1911 census of Ireland there were 3 houses and 15 inhabitants in the townland.
