= Galmoylestown Upper =

Townland in County Westmeath, Ireland

- Townland
- Location of Galmoylestown Upper within County Westmeath in the Republic of Ireland
- Coordinates: 53°35′58″N 7°19′15″W
- Country: Ireland
- Province: Leinster
- County: County Westmeath
- Irish grid reference: N450612

Galmoylestown Upper is a townland in County Westmeath, Ireland. It is around 8 kilometres (5 mi) north of Mullingar.

Galmoylestown Upper is one of 11 townlands of the civil parish of Stonehall in the barony of Corkaree in the Province of Leinster. The townland covers 385.30 acres (1.5593 km^{2}).

The neighbouring townlands are: Martinstown to the north–east, Parsonstown to the south–east, Kilmaglish to the south, Garrysallagh to the south–west, Galmoylestown Lower to the west and Blackmiles to the north.

In the 1911 census of Ireland there was 1 house and 5 inhabitants in the townland.
