= Portloman =

Portloman Port Lomáin
- Townland
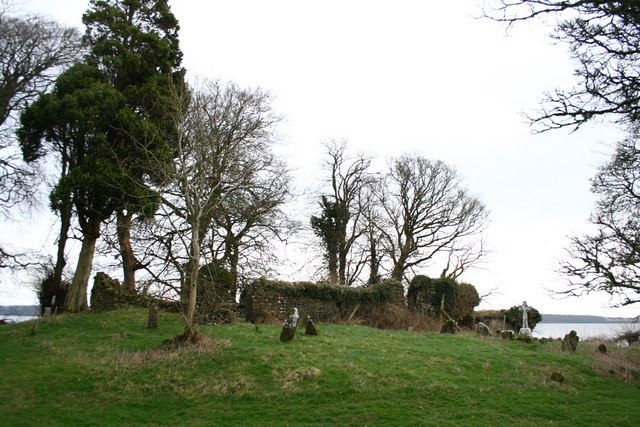
- Church ruin and graveyard in the north of Portloman townland

- Location of Portloman within County Westmeath in the Republic of Ireland
- Coordinates: 53°33′50″N 7°24′45″W
- Country: Ireland
- Province: Leinster
- County: County Westmeath
- Irish grid reference: N389572

Portloman (Irish: Port Lomáin) is a townland in County Westmeath, Ireland. It is located about 6.24 kilometres (4 mi) north–west of Mullingar on the southwestern shore of Lough Owel.

Portloman is one of 8 townlands of the civil parish of Portloman in the barony of Corkaree in the Province of Leinster. The townland covers 289.44 acres (1.1713 km^{2}). The neighbouring townlands are: Wattstown to the north, Ballard to the south, Scurlockstown to the west and Monroe to the north–west. The eastern boundary of the townland is formed by the shoreline of Lough Owel and the small island of Carrickphilbin.

In the 1911 census of Ireland there were 5 houses and 17 inhabitants in the townland; 1 house was unoccupied.
