= Galmoylestown Lower =

Townland in County Westmeath, Ireland

- Townland
- Location of Galmoylestown Lower within County Westmeath in the Republic of Ireland
- Coordinates: 53°36′9″N 7°20′13″W
- Country: Ireland
- Province: Leinster
- County: County Westmeath
- Irish grid reference: N439615

Galmoylestown Lower is a townland in County Westmeath, Ireland. It is located about 9 kilometres (6 mi) north of Mullingar.

Galmoylestown Lower is one of 11 townlands of the civil parish of Stonehall in the barony of Corkaree in the Province of Leinster. The townland covers 254 acres (1.03 km^{2}).

The neighbouring townlands are: Blackmiles to the north, Galmoylestown Upper to the east, Garrysallagh to the south and Down, Larkinstown and Tyfarnham to the west.

In the 1911 census of Ireland there were 5 houses and 25 inhabitants in the townland.
