= Garrysallagh, County Westmeath =

Garrysallagh
- Townland
- Location of Garrysallagh within County Westmeath in the Republic of Ireland
- Coordinates: 53°35′37″N 7°20′5″W
- Country: Ireland
- Province: Leinster
- County: County Westmeath
- Irish grid reference: N441606

Garrysallagh is a townland in County Westmeath, Ireland. It is located about 7.66 kilometres (5 mi) north of Mullingar.

Garrysallagh is one of 11 townlands of the civil parish of Stonehall in the barony of Corkaree in the Province of Leinster. The townland covers 238 acres (0.96 km^{2}). The south–western boundary of the townland is formed by the River Gaine, a tributary of the River Inny.

The neighbouring townlands are: Galmoylestown Lower to the north, Galmoylestown Upper to the east, Ballynagall and Kilmaglish to the south and Down and Loughanstown to the west.

In the 1911 census of Ireland there were only 5 houses and 17 inhabitants in the townland.
