= Whitehouse Primary School =

Coordinates: 54.6607°N 5.9093°W

Location
- 2 Doagh Road; Newtownabbey, County Antrim, Northern Ireland, BT37 9NZ; United Kingdom

Information
- School type: Primary (Controlled)
- Motto: Learning to Live/Ready Safe Respectful [RSR]
- Opened: 1938
- Local authority: Education Authority
- Principal: Miss D Blain
- Vice principal: Mr O Dowds
- Staff: 61
- Teaching staff: 18
- Gender: Mixed
- Age range: 4-11
- Enrollment: 382 (Primary, 2025); 52 (Nursery, 2025)
- Average class size: 25-30
- Colours: Red, Green and White

Whitehouse Primary School is a controlled primary school in Newtownabbey, Northern Ireland. It was destroyed in an arson attack on 18 July 2009. After the school was destroyed, its students were temporarily housed in nearby Newtownabby High School. On 14 May 2010, Education Minister Caitríona Ruane approved an amount of £3.6m for rebuilding the school.

The school colours are Red, Green and White. There is also a new logo for the school, which reads "Whitehouse Primary School Learning to live". The old one simply said "Whitehouse P.S." In 2025, 382 were enrolled in the primary school, with another 52 enrolled full-time with the nursery unit.

== History ==
=== Arson attack ===
The school was the target of an arson attack on 18 July 2009. In the attack, the majority building was burned down, with only the Nursery Unit remaining. It was the third school in the Greater Belfast area to have been targeted within a few days. Following the arson attack, pupils were temporarily moved to surplus classrooms at Newtownabbey Community High School.

=== Rebuilding ===
Plans for rebuilding the school were shelved in April 2010 pending a review of capital projects by the government. After Ruane decided to shelve the plans for rebuilding the school, McConkey and others led a campaign to get the school rebuilt. On 14 May 2010, the Education Minister approved £3.6m for rebuilding the school. In June 2011, McConkey was mentioned and awarded an MBE in the 2011 Queen's Birthday Honours for his services to education in Northern Ireland.
