= Newtownabbey Community High School =

Secondary school in Newtownabbey, Northern Ireland

Location
- Rathcoole Drive; Newtownabbey, Northern Ireland, BT37 9RQ; United Kingdom
- Coordinates: 54.659°N 5.910°W

Information
- School type: Secondary (Controlled)
- Founded: 1994
- Closed: August 2015
- Local authority: Education Authority
- Principal: John Lewis
- Gender: Mixed
- Merged into: Abbey Community College

Newtownabbey Community High School was a secondary school in Newtownabbey, Northern Ireland.

Newtownabbey Community High School, founded in 1994, was a controlled, co-educational school providing secondary level education. The school was situated on Rathcoole Drive in the Rathcoole estate.

The school was under the administration of the North Eastern Education and Library Board (NEELB) until 2015 when the Education and Library Boards system was changed to newly-formed Education Authority months prior to the schools closure.

== School in the community ==
After the nearby Whitehouse Primary School was destroyed in an arson attack, the high school donated part of their building to keep the primary school running until it was rebuilt.

The High School also had an arson attack on 30 July 2006 which destroyed the two classrooms and damaged other rooms.

The school was featured in a 2012 data analysis of schools in Northern Ireland by The Guardian, where 86.5% of the pupils were Protestant, 3.0% were Catholic, and 10.4% were from an 'other' community background.

== Curriculum ==
The High School contained a Hair Salon which was operated by students.

GCSE students were offered a Careers Experience programme where pupils could get experience by working a one week long apprenticeship or one week in the Military followed by a one week apprenticeship.

== Closed ==
Newtownabbey Community High School closed in August 2015 to merge with Monkstown Community School. The new school is called Abbey Community College. In June 2017, the former school was completely destroyed in a second arson attack, which was then demolished in 2018. As of March 2024 the former site was being used for housing development.
