= Monkstown, County Westmeath =

Monkstown
- Townland
- Location of Monkstown within County Westmeath in the Republic of Ireland
- Coordinates: 53°35′24″N 7°16′8″W
- Country: Ireland
- Province: Leinster
- County: County Westmeath
- Irish grid reference: N484602

Monkstown is a townland in County Westmeath, Ireland. It is located about 8.79 kilometres (5 mi) north–east of Mullingar.

Monkstown is one of 11 townlands of the civil parish of Taghmon in the barony of Corkaree in the Province of Leinster. The townland covers 588.81 acres (2.3828 km^{2}).

The neighbouring townlands are: Taghmon and Glebe to the north, Rathcorbally and Downs to the east, Clonkill and Toberaquill to the south, Knockatee to the south–west, Sheefin to the west and Farrancallin to the north–west.

In the 1911 census of Ireland there were 19 houses and 81 inhabitants in the townland.
