= Monkstown Community School =

School in County Antrim, Northern Ireland

Coordinates: 54.6902°N 5.9191°W

Monkstown Community School was a mixed non-denominational secondary school in Monkstown, County Antrim, Northern Ireland. It closed in 2015 when it merged with Newtownabbey Community High School to form Abbey Community College.

== General National Vocational Qualifications (GNVQ) ==
Two-year GNVQ Advanced courses in Business Studies, ICT and Leisure and Tourism were offered . A one-year course Intermediate level GNVQ was offered in Business Studies. Pupils will also study and have to demonstrate competence in the core skills of Information Technology, Application of Number and Communications.

The School had a Moderate Learning Difficulties Unit with three specialist teachers who work with pupils, parents, subject teachers and external agencies to ensure that the appropriate support is provided. This included

1:1 support

- Learning Assistants
- Reading Partnerships
- Small teaching groups
- Extra support in subject classes
- North Eastern Board personnel
- A range of teaching approaches to enable pupils to develop confidence and understanding.

== Statistics ==
Pupils

Average enrolment in 2005 – 2006 was 708

134 Year 8 pupils were admitted into the School in September 2005.

	Admission Number	Number of Applications	Number of Admissions
2002-03	164	125	125
2003-04	164	132	132
2004-05	164	133	133
2006-07	164	134	134

Enrolled Pupils: 777
