= Templeoran =

Townland in County Westmeath, Ireland

Templeoran Teampall Odhráin
- Townland
- Location of Templeoran within County Westmeath in the Republic of Ireland
- Coordinates: 53°35′1″N 7°27′34″W
- Country: Ireland
- Province: Leinster
- County: County Westmeath
- Irish grid reference: N358594

Templeoran (Irish: Teampall Odhráin, meaning 'Oran's church') also known as Piercefield or Templeoran is a townland in County Westmeath, Ireland. It is located about 10 kilometres (6 mi) north‑west of Mullingar. It should not be confused with Piercefield, a townland in the neighbouring civil parish of Leny.

Templeoran is one of 12 townlands of the civil parish of Templeoran in the barony of Moygoish in the Province of Leinster. The townland covers 756.68 acres (3.0622 km^{2}). The neighbouring townlands are: Farrow, Grange and Piercefield to the north, Balrath and Grangegeeth to the east, Ballyedward, Johnstown and Sonna Demesne to the south and Ballyhug to the west.

In the 1911 census of Ireland there were 14 houses and 67 inhabitants in the townland.
