= Lough Owel =

Lake in County Westmeath, Ireland, feeding the Royal Canal

- Loch Uail (Irish)
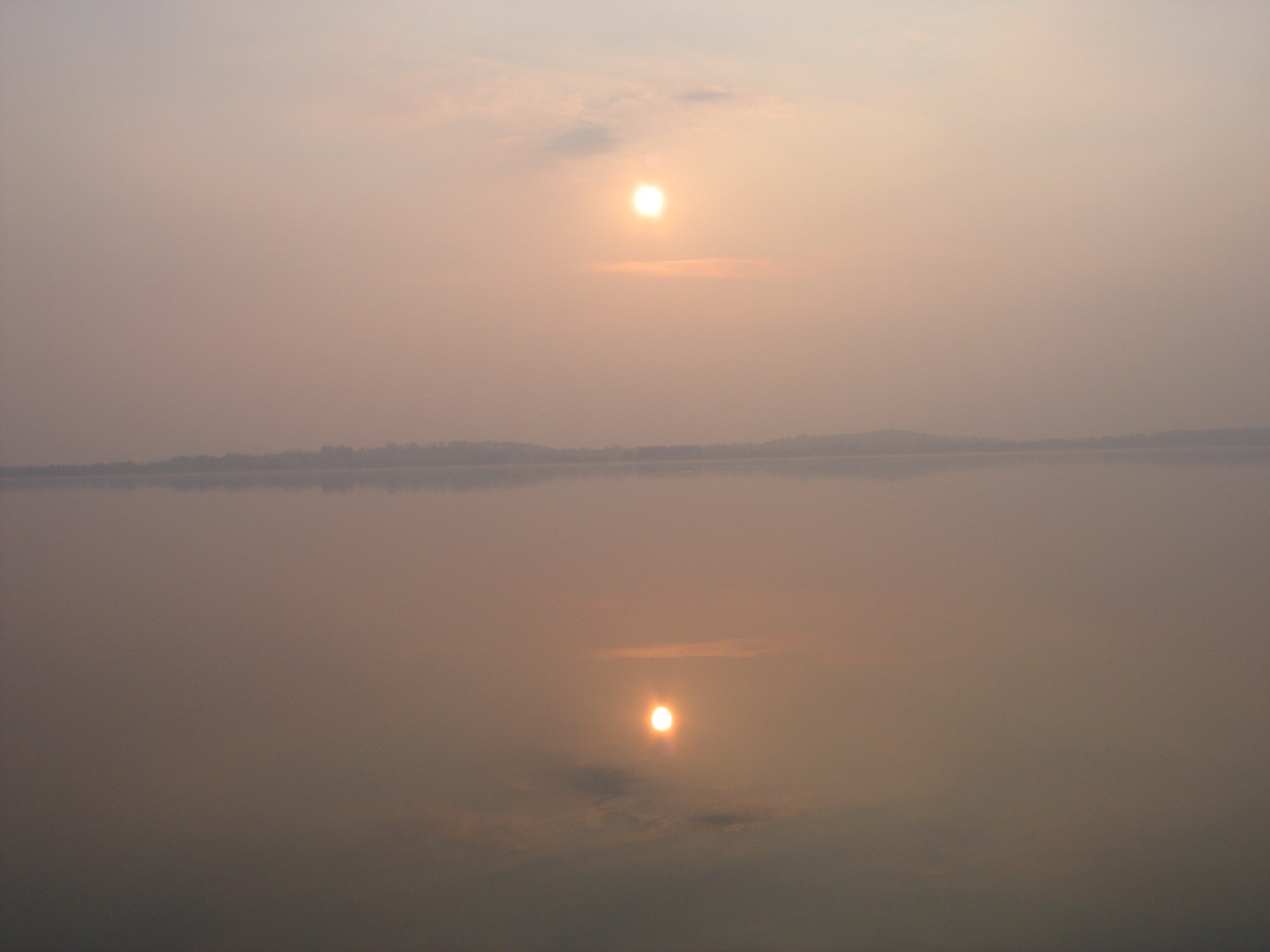

- Location in Ireland
- Location: County Westmeath
- Coordinates: 53°34′23″N 7°23′18″W
- Lake type: Glacial lake
- Primary outflows: River Brosna
- Catchment area: 32.15 km^{2} (12.41 sq mi)
- Basin countries: Ireland
- Max. length: 6 km (3.7 mi)
- Max. width: 3 km (1.9 mi)
- Surface area: 10.22 km^{2} (3.95 sq mi)
- Max. depth: 21 m (69 ft)
- Surface elevation: 97 m (318 ft)
- Islands: 6

Ramsar Wetland
- Designated: 7 June 1996
- Reference no.: 851

Lough Owel (/lɒx ˈuːəl/, lokh OO-ell; Irish: Loch Uail) is a mesotrophic lough in the Midlands of Ireland, situated north of Mullingar, the county town of Westmeath. It has a maximum depth of 21 metres (69 ft). Water from Lough Owel feeds the Royal Canal, a canal crossing Ireland from Dublin to the River Shannon. The lake is close to the N4 primary road.

== Hydrology ==
Lough Owel and Lough Ennell are two of many lakes that form the River Brosna drainage basin. The Brosna is a tributary of the Shannon, flowing through Mullingar and Kilbeggan, both in Westmeath, and from there through the town of Clara (County Offaly) into the Shannon. It is a large, deep, calcareous spring-fed lake and has clear water with a high pH.

== Islands and history ==
There are four main islands in the lough, the largest being Church Island, named because of the ruins of a church known as St. Loman's Oratory that used to be in the Parish of Mullingar. St Loman was a hermit on the island, where he was said to have subsisted on a diet of wild alexanders (Smyrnium olusatrum). The other three islands are Srudarra Island, Lady's Island and Carrickphilbin Island. The Viking chieftain Turgesius is said to have been drowned in Lough Owel by Máel Sechnaill mac Maíl Ruanaid in 845.

== Natural history ==
Since 1996 the lake has received international protection as a Ramsar site. The lake and the wetlands surrounding it are rich in vascular plant species, including a number of rare plants. The lake is inhabited by a variety of interesting fish populations and there are many resident and migratory birds. The farmland surrounding the lake is the home to a considerable number of overwintering white-fronted geese from Greenland. It is noted for its birdlife and is also well known amongst anglers, and holds a few char along with brown trout. Because of the limited spawning facilities in the streams feeding the lough, the local Cullion Fish Farm is used to rear some of the trout eggs stripped from the adult fish, and the fish fry is later returned to the lough.

== See also ==
- List of loughs in Ireland
