= List of Special Protection Areas in the Republic of Ireland =

Designated EU bird protection areas

The following is a list of Special Protection Areas in the Republic of Ireland known as SPA, as listed by the National Parks and Wildlife Service (NPWS). The Special Protection Areas are designated areas of protection under the European Union Birds Directive and are in place to protect rare and vulnerable bird species, migratory bird species, and wetlands that are deemed to be internationally important.

== Connacht ==
Name	Photo	County	Land area (hectares)	EU Code
Connemara Bog Complex	Connemara Bog	Galway	19201.5	IE0004181
Coole-Garryland Complex	Coole Park	Galway	519.95	IE0004107
Cregganna Marsh		Galway	167.86	IE0004142
Cruagh Island		Galway	292.44	IE0004170
High Island, Inishshark and Davillaun	Inishshark	Galway	1216.95	IE0004144
Illaunnanoon		Galway	19.78	IE0004221
Inishbofin, Omey Island and Turbot Island	Inishbofin	Galway	171.47	IE0004231
Inishmore	Inishmore	Galway	1917.63	IE0004152
Inner Galway Bay	Galway Bay	Galway	13261.57	IE0004031
Lough Corrib	Lough Corrib	Galway, Mayo	18623.94	IE0004042
Lough Cutra	Lough Cutra	Galway	386.72	IE0004056
Lough Derg (Shannon)	Lough Derg	Galway	12709.47	IE0004058
Lough Mask	Lough Mask	Galway, Mayo	8735.65	IE0004062
Lough Rea	Lough Rea	Galway	365.41	IE0004134
Middle Shannon Callows		Galway, Roscommon	5814.85	IE0004096
Rahasane Turlough		Galway	372.30	IE0004089
River Suck Callows		Galway, Roscommon	3182.03	IE0004097
Slieve Aughty Mountains		Galway	59457.16	IE0004168
Slyne Head to Ardmore Point Islands		Galway	3377.68	IE0004159
Sligo/Leitrim Uplands		Leitrim, Sligo	1733.55	IE0004187
Bills Rocks	Bills Rocks	Mayo	149.66	IE0004177
Blacksod Bay/Broad Haven	Blacksod Bay	Mayo	8535.68	IE0004037
Carrowmore Lake	Carrowmore Lake	Mayo	965.52	IE0004052
Clare Island	Clare Island	Mayo	1005.74	IE0004136
Cross Lough (Killadoon)	Cross Lough	Mayo	26.74	IE0004212
Doogort Machair		Mayo	116.43	IE0004235
Duvillaun Islands		Mayo	529.80	IE0004111
Illanmaster		Mayo	164.94	IE0004074
Inishglora and Inishkeeragh	Inishglora	Mayo	381.89	IE0004084
Inishkea Islands	Inishkea South Island	Mayo	1329.76	IE0004004
Killala Bay/Moy Estuary	Killala Bay	Mayo, Sligo	3202.02	IE0004036
Lough Carra	Lough Carra	Mayo	1760.27	IE0004051
Lough Conn and Lough Cullin	Lough Conn	Mayo	6457.58	IE0004228
Mullet Peninsula	Mullet Peninsula	Mayo	325.55	IE0004227
Owenduff/Nephin Complex	Lough Conn and Nephin	Mayo	25692.83	IE0004098
Stags of Broad Haven	Stags of Broad Haven	Mayo	136.38	IE0004072
Termoncarragh Lake and Annagh Machair		Mayo	405.98	IE0004093
Ballykenny-Fisherstown Bog		Roscommon	1355.67	IE0004101
Bellanagare Bog		Roscommon	1233.78	IE0004105
Four Roads Turlough		Roscommon	99.6	IE0004140
Lough Arrow	Lough Arrow	Roscommon, Sligo	1337.91	IE0004050
Lough Croan Turlough		Roscommon	151.26	IE0004139
Lough Gara	Lough Gara	Roscommon	1689.78	IE0004048
Lough Ree	Lough Ree	Roscommon	12347.98	IE0004064
Ardboline Island and Horse Island	Horse Island	Sligo	148.29	IE0004135
Aughris Head	Aughris Head	Sligo	54.8	IE0004133
Ballintemple and Ballygilgan	Ballygilgan	Sligo	235.41	IE0004234
Ballysadare Bay	Ballysadare Bay	Sligo	2129.06	IE0004129
Cummeen Strand		Sligo	1731.69	IE0004035
Drumcliff Bay	Drumcliff Bay	Sligo	1842.68	IE0004013
Inishmurray	Inishmurray	Sligo	234.66	IE0004068

== Leinster ==
Name	Photo	County	Land area (hectares)	EU Code
Baldoyle Bay	Baldoyle Estuary	Dublin	262.65	IE0004016
Dalkey Islands	Goats at Dalkey Island	Dublin	83.04	IE0004172
Howth Head Coast	Howth Head	Dublin	207.73	IE0004113
Ireland's Eye	Beach on Ireland's Eye	Dublin	214.43	IE0004117
Lambay Island	Lambay Island	Dublin	599.3	IE0004069
Malahide Estuary	Malahide Estuary	Dublin	764.63	IE0004025
North Bull Island	Bull Island Nature Reserve	Dublin	1943.47	IE0004006
Rockabill	Rockabill	Dublin	5227.09	IE0004014
Rogerstown Estuary		Dublin	645.35	IE0004015
Skerries Islands		Dublin	217.12	IE0004122
South Dublin Bay and River Tolka Estuary	South Dublin Bay	Dublin	2193.17	IE0004024
Poulaphouca Reservoir	Poulaphouca Reservoir	Kildare, Wicklow	2009.5	IE0004063
River Nore	River Nore	Kilkenny, Laois	414.57	IE0004233
Slieve Bloom Mountains		Laois, Offaly	21774.46	IE0004160
Ballykenny-Fisherstown Bog		Longford	1355.67	IE0004101
Glen Lough		Longford, Westmeath	82.27	IE0004045
Lough Kinale and Derragh Lough	Lough Kinale	Longford, Westmeath	287.8	IE0004061
Lough Ree	Lough Ree	Longford, Westmeath	12347.98	IE0004064
Boyne Estuary	Boyne Estuary	Louth, Meath	593.43	IE0004080
Carlingford Lough	Carlingford Lough	Louth	595.12	IE0004078
Dundalk Bay	Dundalk Bay	Louth	13237.9	IE0004026
River Boyne and River Blackwater	River Boyne	Louth, Meath, Westmeath	460.14	IE0004232
Stabannan-Braganstown		Louth	251.89	IE0004091
Lough Sheelin	Lough Sheelin	Meath, Westmeath	1900.92	IE0004065
River Nanny Estuary and Shore	Mouth of the River Nanny	Meath	229.68	IE0004158
All Saints Bog		Offaly	322.64	IE0004103
Dovegrove Callows		Offaly	124.51	IE0004137
Middle Shannon Callows		Offaly, Westmeath	5814.85	IE0004096
Mongan Bog	Mongan Bog	Offaly	129.33	IE0004017
River Little Brosna Callows		Offaly	1100.92	IE0004086
Garriskil Bog		Westmeath	324.11	IE0004102
Lough Derravaragh	Lough Derravaragh	Westmeath	1130.09	IE0004043
Lough Ennell	Lough Ennell	Westmeath	1397.66	IE0004044
Lough Iron		Westmeath	933.35	IE0004046
Lough Owel	Lough Owel	Westmeath	1118.64	IE0004047
Ballyteigue Burrow	Ballyteigue Burrow	Wexford		IE0004020
Bannow Bay		Wexford	1363.32	IE0004033
Cahore Marshes		Wexford	191.52	IE0004143
Keeragh Islands	Keeragh Islands	Wexford	80	IE0004118
Lady's Island Lake	Lady's Island Lake	Wexford	478.6	IE0004009
Saltee Islands	The Great Saltee	Wexford	870.62	IE0004002
Tacumshin Lake		Wexford	476.17	IE0004092
The Raven	The Raven Nature Reserve	Wexford	4204.63	IE0004019
Wexford Harbour and Slobs	Wexford Harbour	Wexford	5979.34	IE0004076
The Murrough		Wicklow	940.78	IE0004186
Wicklow Head	View of Wicklow and Wicklow Head	Wicklow	195.05	IE0004127
Wicklow Mountains	Wicklow Mountains	Wicklow, Dublin	30014.31	IE0004040

== Munster ==
Name	Photo	County	Land area (hectares)	EU Code
Ballyallia Lake		Clare	140.73	IE0004041
Cliffs of Moher	Cliffs of Moher	Clare	873.94	IE0004005
Corofin Wetlands		Clare	599.86	IE0004220
Illaunonearaun		Clare	45.95	IE0004114
Inner Galway Bay		Clare	13261.57	IE0004031
Loop Head	Loop Head	Clare	377	IE0004119
Lough Derg	Lough Derg	Clare, Tipperary	12709.47	IE0004058
Mid-Clare Coast		Clare	4638.65	IE0004182
River Shannon and River Fergus Estuaries	River Fergus Estuary	Clare, Kerry, Limerick	32237.6	IE0004077
Slieve Aughty Mountains		Clare	59457.16	IE0004168
Ballycotton Bay		Cork	281.22	IE0004022
Ballymacoda Bay		Cork	586.23	IE0004023
Beara Peninsula		Cork	2612.08	IE0004155
Blackwater Callows		Cork, Waterford	1037.73	IE0004094
Blackwater Estuary		Cork, Waterford	869.8	IE0004028
Clonakilty Bay	Clonakilty Bay	Cork	507.76	IE0004081
Cork Harbour	Cork Harbour	Cork	2660.27	IE0004030
Courtmacsherry Bay	Courtmacsherry Bay	Cork	1298.71	IE0004219
Galley Head to Duneen Point	Galley Head, Rosscarbery Bay	Cork	416.1	IE0004190
Kilcolman Bog		Cork	56.71	IE0004095
Mullaghanish to Musheramore Mountains	Mullaghanish from Foilanomera	Cork	4975.63	IE0004162
Old Head of Kinsale	Old Head of Kinsale Cliffs	Cork	53.63	IE0004021
Seven Heads		Cork	446.85	IE0004191
Sheep's Head to Toe Head	Sheep's Head	Cork	2500.11	IE0004156
Sovereign Islands		Cork	28.7	IE0004124
Stack's to Mullaghareirk Mountains, West Limerick Hills and Mount Eagle		Cork, Kerry, Limerick	56648.85	IE0004161
The Bull and The Cow Rocks		Cork	380.12	IE0004066
The Gearagh	The Gearagh	Cork	322.58	IE0004109
Blasket Islands	Blasket Islands	Kerry	3620.37	IE0004008
Castlemaine Harbour	Castlemaine Harbour	Kerry	12397.41	IE0004029
Deenish Island and Scariff Island	Scariff and Deenish Islands	Kerry	845.35	IE0004175
Dingle Peninsula	Dingle Peninsula	Kerry	4153.23	IE0004153
Eirk Bog	Eirk Bog	Kerry	13.23	IE0004108
Iveragh Peninsula	Iveragh Peninsula	Kerry	3486.97	IE0004154
Kerry Head	Kerry Head	Kerry	961.84	IE0004189
Killarney National Park	Lakes of Killarney	Kerry	10328.14	IE0004038
Magharee Islands	Magharee Islands	Kerry	416.92	IE0004125
Puffin Island	Puffin Island	Kerry	349.14	IE0004003
Skellig Islands	Skellig Islands	Kerry	624.08	IE0004007
Tralee Bay Complex	Tralee Bay	Kerry	3655.61	IE0004188
Slieve Felim to Silvermines Mountains	Keeper Hill	Limerick, Tipperary	20913.05	IE0004165
Middle Shannon Callows		Tipperary	5814.85	IE0004096
River Little Brosna Callows		Tipperary	1100.92	IE0004086
Dungarvan Harbour	Dungarvan Harbour	Waterford	2221.51	IE0004032
Helvick Head to Ballyquin	Helvick Head	Waterford	784.32	IE0004192
Mid-Waterford Coast		Waterford	937.06	IE0004193
Tramore Back Strand	Tramore Dunes and Backstrand	Waterford	675.68	IE0004027

== Ulster ==
Name	Photo	County	Land area (hectares)	EU Code
Lough Kinale and Derragh Lough	Lough Kinale	Cavan	287.8	IE0004061
Lough Oughter Complex	Lough Oughter	Cavan	1972.94	IE0004049
Lough Sheelin	Lough Sheelin	Cavan	1900.92	IE0004065
River Boyne and River Blackwater		Cavan	460.14	IE0004232
Derryveagh and Glendowan Mountains	Derryveagh	Donegal	31483.23	IE0004039
Donegal Bay	Donegal Bay	Donegal	10455.87	IE0004151
Durnesh Lough	Durnesh Lough	Donegal	144.41	IE0004145
Falcarragh to Meenlaragh	Falcarragh	Donegal	302.86	IE0004149
Fanad Head	Fanad Head	Donegal	136.07	IE0004148
Greers Isle		Donegal	19.13	IE0004082
Horn Head to Fanad Head	Horn Head cliffs	Donegal	2385.34	IE0004194
Illancrone and Inishkeeragh	Inishkeeragh	Donegal	419.4	IE0004132
Inishbofin, Inishdooey and Inishbeg	Inishbofin	Donegal	601.17	IE0004083
Inishduff		Donegal	46.48	IE0004115
Inishkeel	Inishkeel	Donegal	124.41	IE0004116
Inishtrahull	Inishtrahull	Donegal	474.24	IE0004100
Lough Derg, County Donegal	Lough Derg	Donegal	889.88	IE0004057
Lough Fern		Donegal	299.91	IE0004060
Lough Foyle	Lough Foyle	Donegal	587.67	IE0004087
Lough Nillan Bog		Donegal	4114.34	IE0004110
Lough Swilly	Lough Swilly	Donegal	8559.56	IE0004075
Malin Head	Malin head coast	Donegal	281.07	IE0004146
Pettigo Plateau		Donegal	691.28	IE0004099
Rathlin O'Birne Island	Rathlin O'Birne Island	Donegal	153.55	IE0004120
Roaninish		Donegal	145.76	IE0004121
Sheskinmore Lough		Donegal	563.04	IE0004090
Tory Island	Tory Island coast	Donegal	570.77	IE0004073
Trawbreaga Bay	Mouth of Trawbreaga Bay	Donegal	1549.16	IE0004034
West Donegal Coast		Donegal	3376.56	IE0004150
West Donegal Islands		Donegal	1128.80	IE0004230
Slieve Beagh	Bragan Townland	Monaghan	3455.35	IE0004167

== See also ==
- List of Special Areas of Conservation in the Republic of Ireland
- List of Special Protection Areas in the United Kingdom

== Sources ==
- Special Protection Areas (SPA) dataset from the National Park and Wildlife Service available under CC-BY-SA 4.0 licence
