= Tang, County Westmeath =

Village in County Westmeath, Ireland

Tang An Teanga
- Village
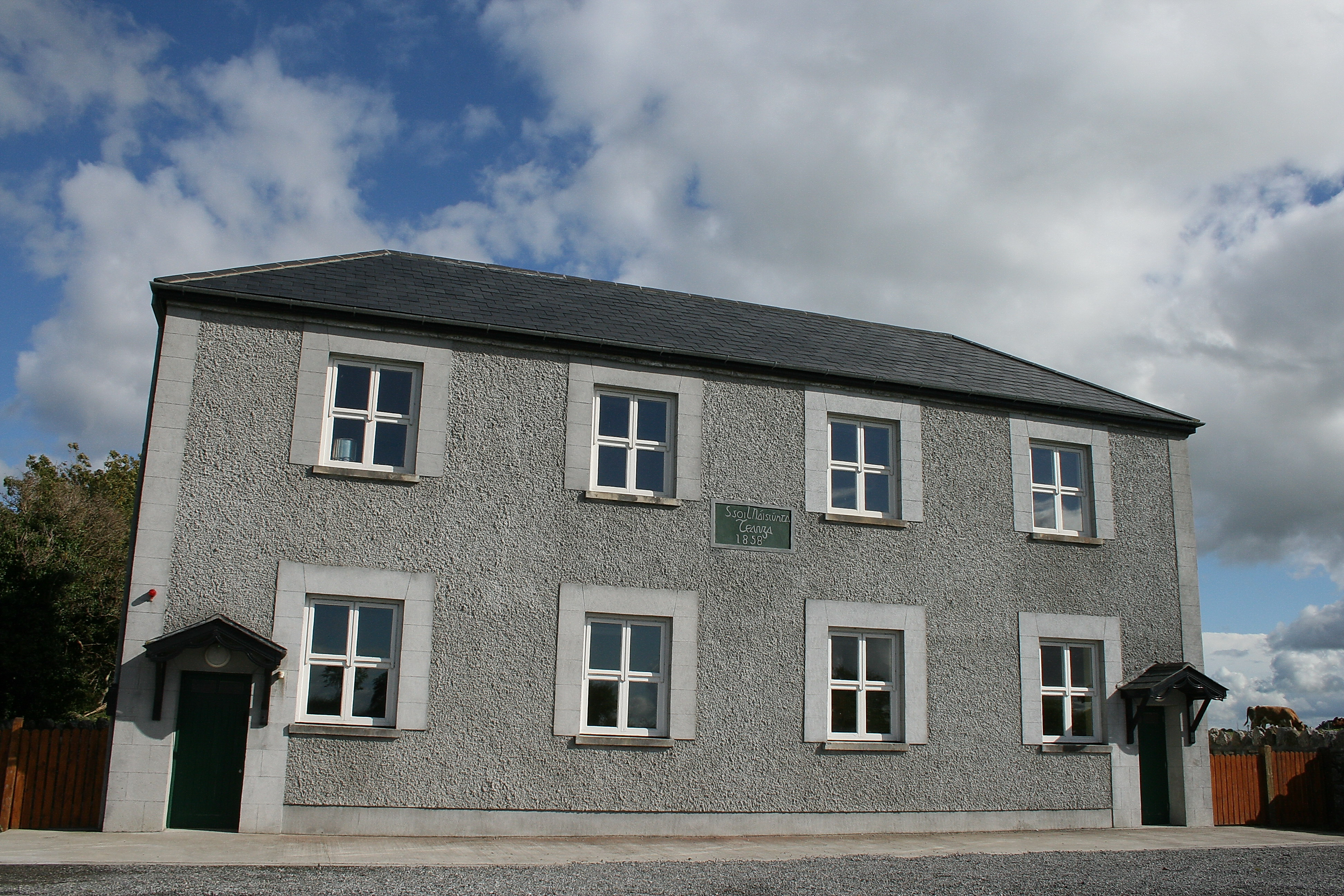
- Tang Community Centre

- Location in Ireland
- Coordinates: 53°32′06″N 7°47′13″W
- Country: Ireland
- Province: Leinster
- County: County Westmeath
- Elevation: 66 m (217 ft)
- Time zone: UTC+0 (WET)
  - Summer (DST): UTC-1 (IST (WEST))
- Irish Grid Reference: N133541

Tang (Irish: An Teanga, meaning 'the tongue') is a village and a 'half-parish' in County Westmeath, on the N55 national secondary road between Athlone and Ballymahon, County Longford. Tang forms part of the ecclesiastical parish of Drumraney. It is in County Westmeath but on the border with County Longford from which it is separated by the Dungorman River which flows into Lough Ree 3 km downstream via the River Inny. The village is 15 km north-east of Athlone

== See also ==
- List of towns and villages in the Republic of Ireland
- Matt Devlin
