= R399 road =

R399 road may refer to:

- R399 road (Ireland)
- R399 road (South Africa)
