= Taghshinny =

Village in County Longford, Ireland

Coordinates: 53°35′31″N 7°41′54″W

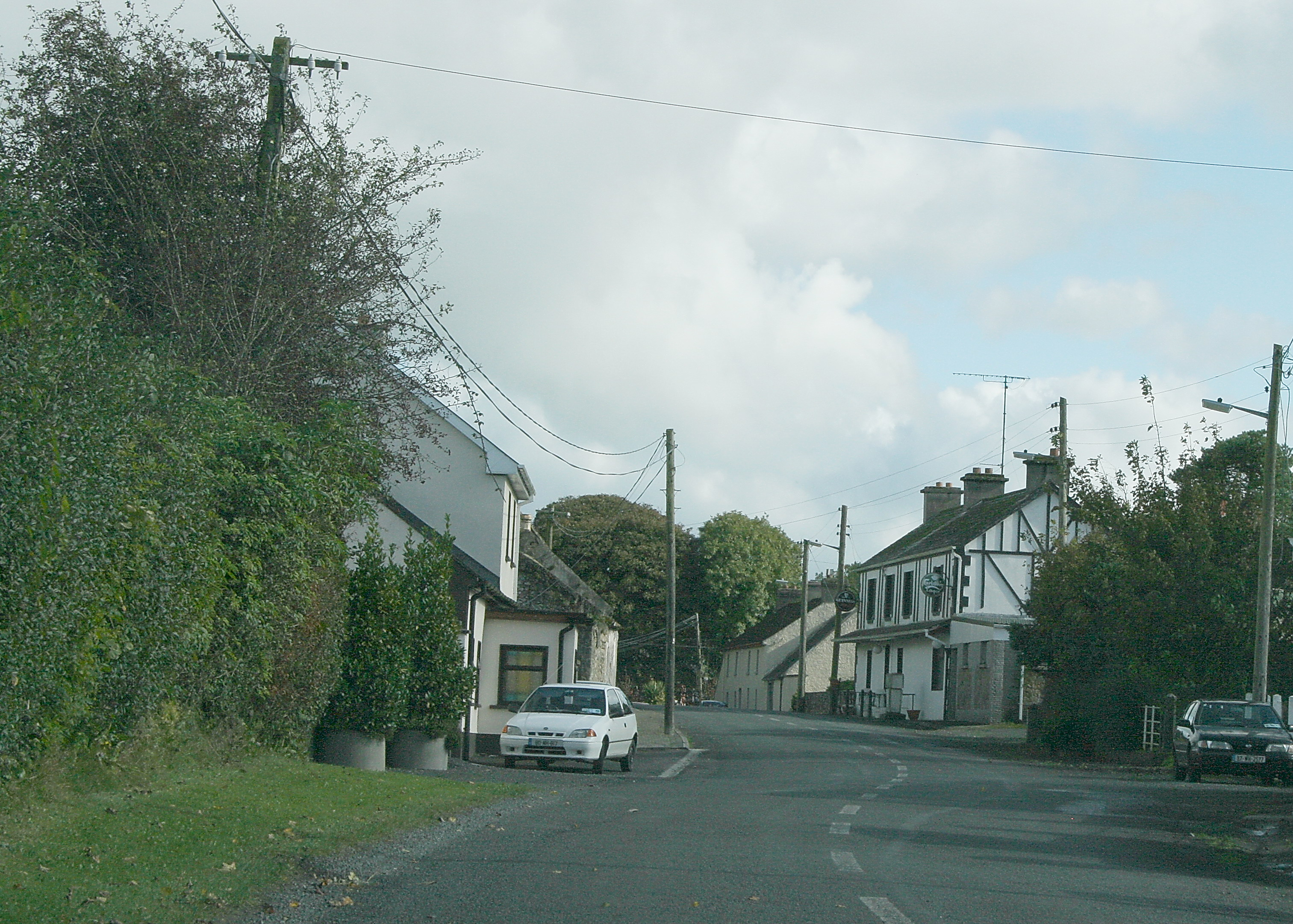
Taghshinny on the R399

Taghshinny, also written as Tashinny (Irish: Teach Sinche, meaning 'house of Sineach'), is a village and civil parish in south-east County Longford, Ireland, north-east of Ballymahon. It is also in a townland of the same name.

The local Church of Ireland is home to the large "Annaly monument". This monument is dedicated to the Gore family who were major landowners in this part of County Longford in the eighteenth century and gained the title Baron Annaly. Their principal residence was Tennelick, which they inherited from the Sankey family, who acquired large estates in Ireland in the seventeenth century, and was just outside Taghshinny.

Taghshinny lies on the R399 road, 5 km north-east of Ballymahon.

== See also ==
- List of towns and villages in Ireland
