= Finnea =

Village in County Westmeath, Ireland

Finnea Fiodh an Átha
- Village
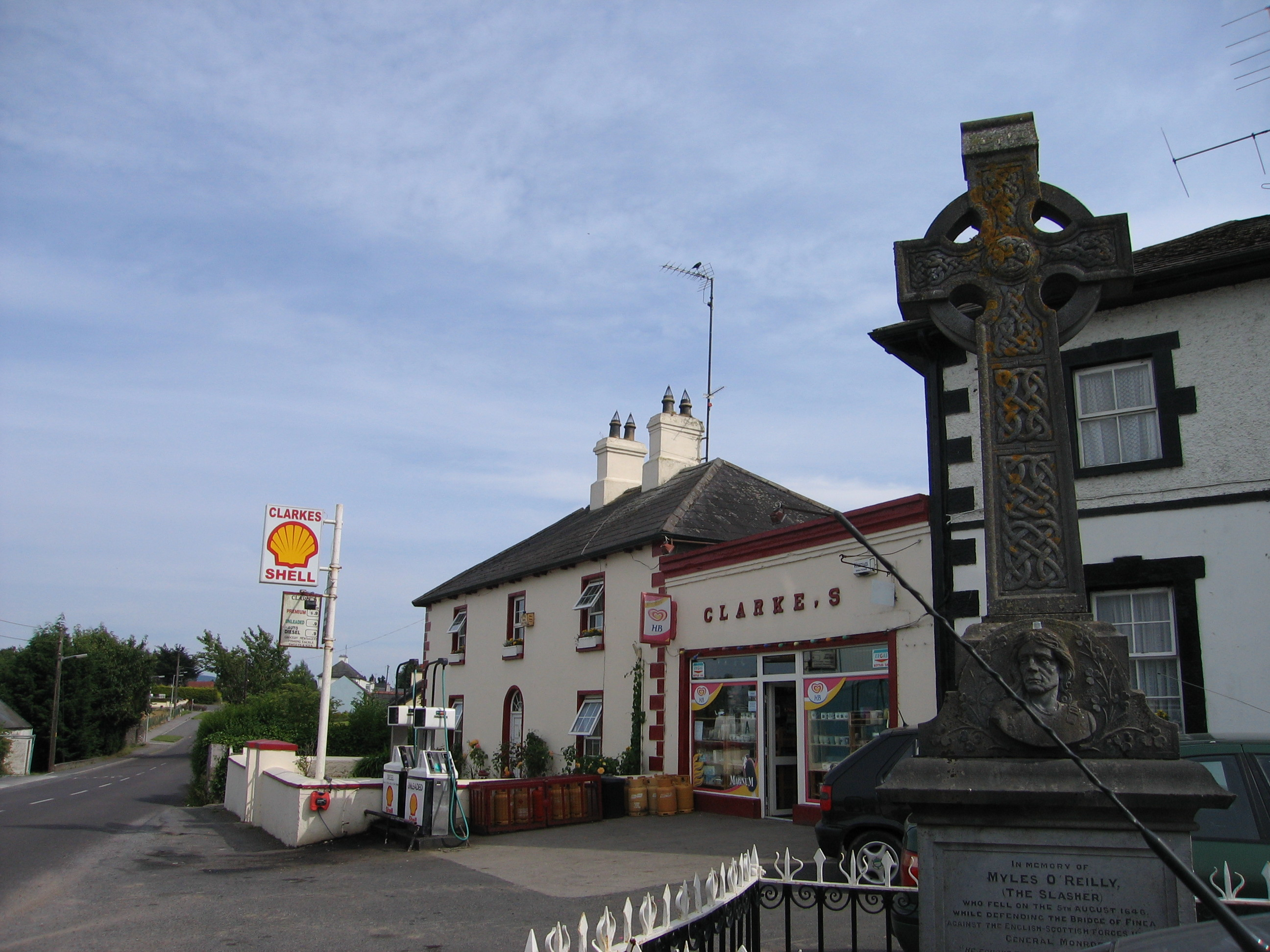

- Location in Ireland
- Coordinates: 53°46′57″N 7°23′44″W
- Country: Ireland
- Province: Leinster
- County: County Westmeath
- Elevation: 66 m (217 ft)
- Time zone: UTC+0 (WET)
  - Summer (DST): UTC-1 (IST (WEST))
- Irish Grid Reference: N399816

Finnea (Irish: Fiodh an Átha, meaning 'wood of the ford'), also Finea, is a small village in County Westmeath, Ireland. It is on the border with County Cavan, on the R394 road. The village is very roughly 25 km from each of Mullingar, Cavan town and Longford town.

== Transport ==
Bus Éireann route 447 provides a link to Castlepollard, Crookedwood and Mullingar on Thursdays only. The nearest railway station is Edgeworthstown, about 22 km (14 mi) distant.

== History ==
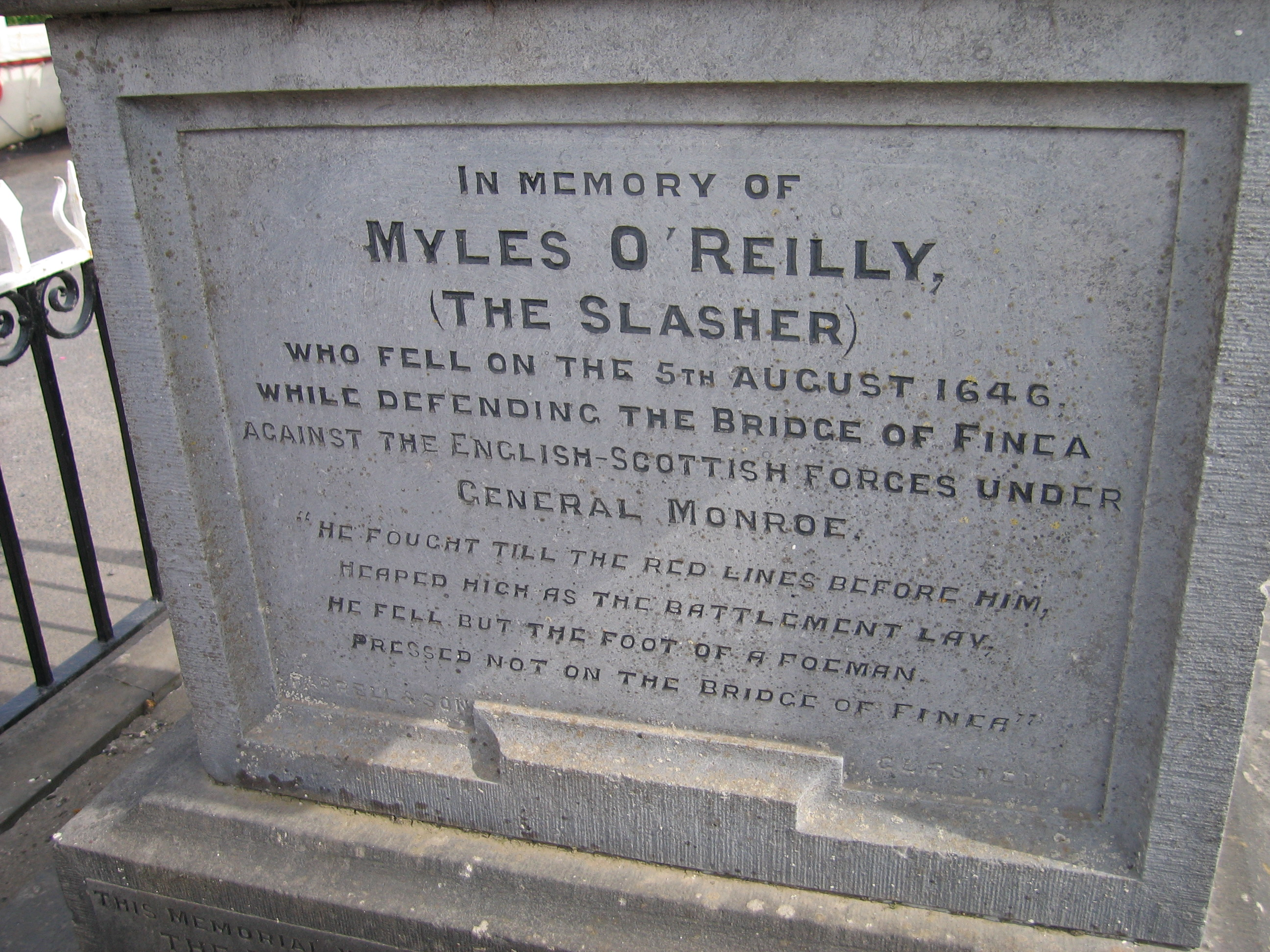
Inscription on "Slasher" monument

The village is known for its association with Myles "The Slasher" O'Reilly whose monument in the town (pictured) relates how he died on 5 August 1646 defending the Bridge of Finea against English-Scottish forces. Percy French also mentioned the Bridge of Finnea in his ballad "Come Back Paddy Reilly".

Finnea lies on land between Lough Sheelin and Lough Kinale, and the bridge crosses the River Inny, flowing between them.

Finnea is also the birthplace of writer Dermot Healy. Thomas Davis celebrated the village with his ballad "The Flower of Finae". Finnea is also known for its scenery, fishing and game shooting which attract many foreign tourists.

Victoria Cross recipient, General Sir Mark Walker, was born in Gore Port, Finnea. He was the brother of Sir Samuel Walker, 1st Baronet, who was appointed Lord Chancellor of Ireland by Gladstone in 1892.

== Notable residents ==
- General Sir Mark Walker, recipient of the Victoria Cross and his younger brother Sir Samuel Walker, 1st Baronet, Lord Chancellor of Ireland.

== Gallery ==
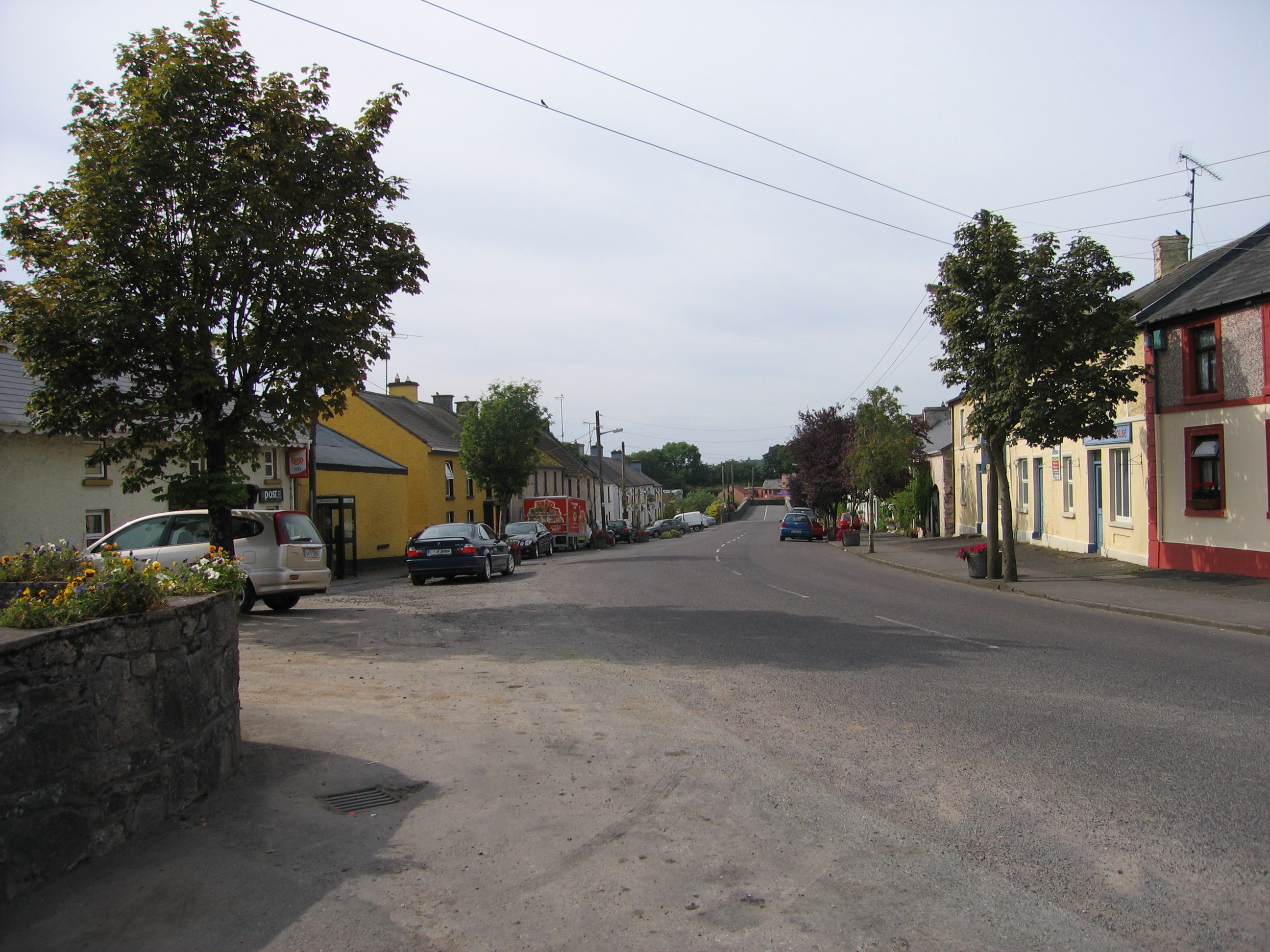
Finea village, due north

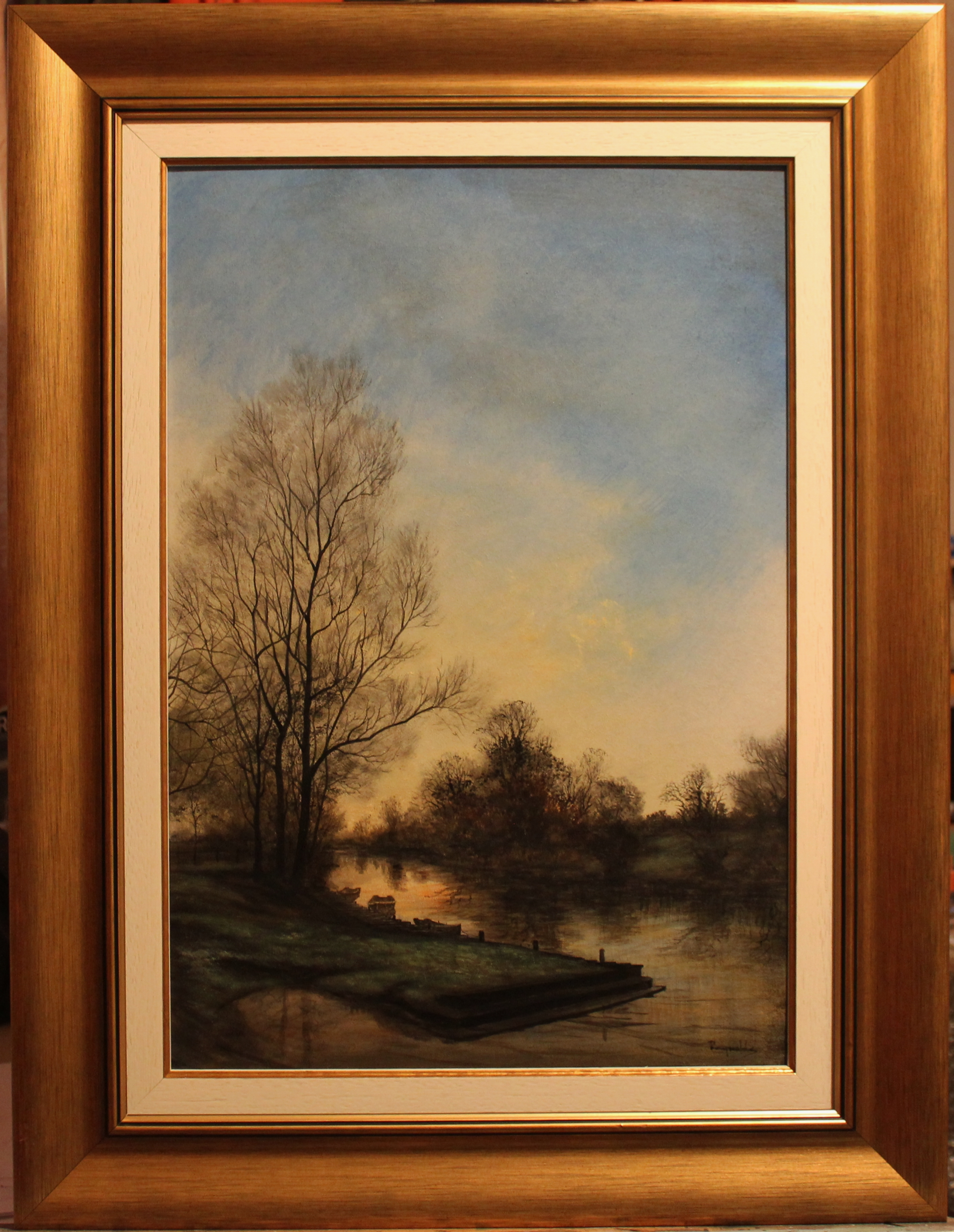
Painting by Bernard Reynolds of the River Inny at Finea

== See also ==
- List of towns and villages in the Republic of Ireland
- List of Irish towns with a Market House
