= Abbeyshrule Aerodrome =

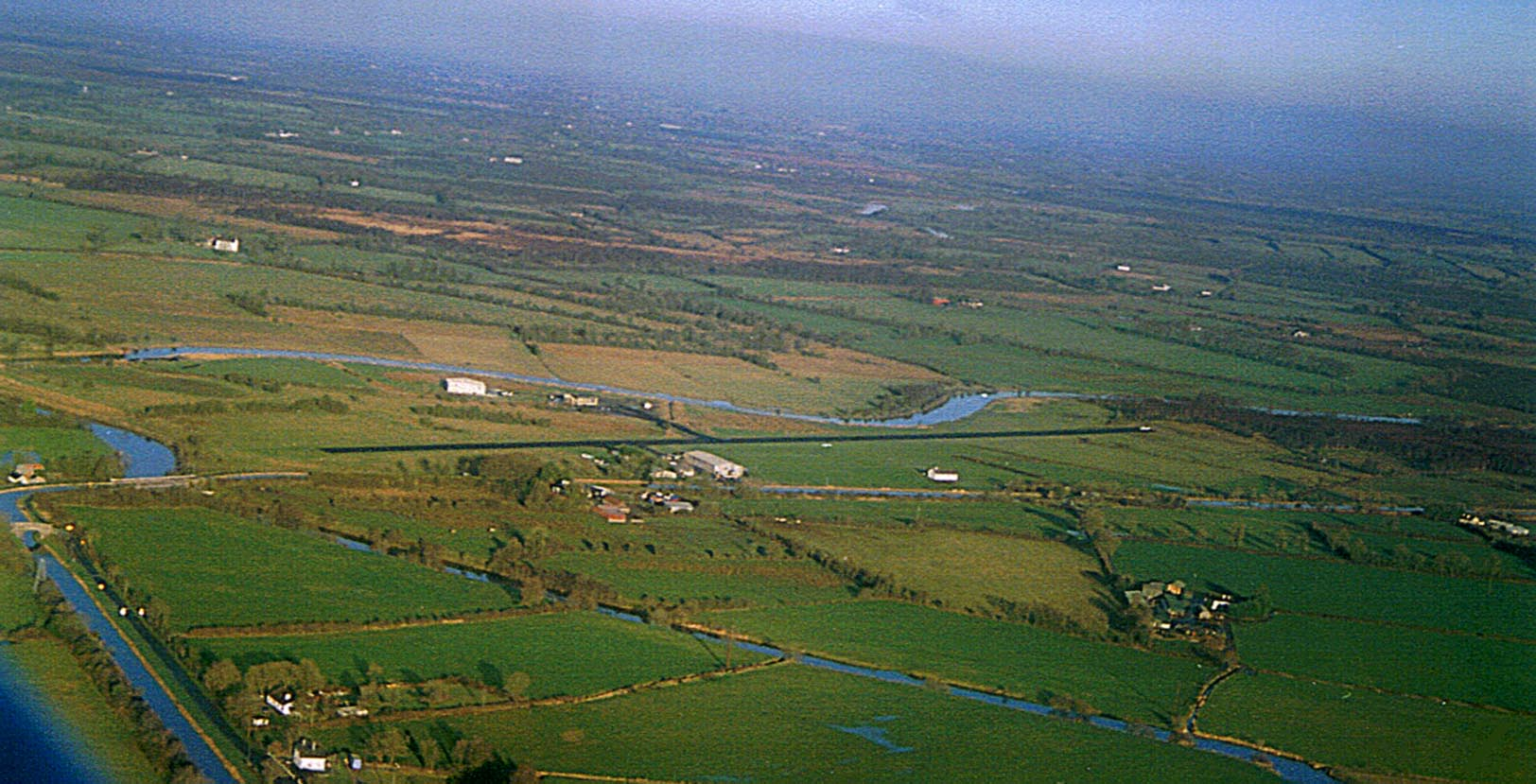
- IATA: none; ICAO: EIAB

Summary
- Airport type: Private
- Operator: Longford Aviation Ltd.
- Serves: Athlone, Longford, Mullingar
- Location: Abbeyshrule, Ireland
- Elevation AMSL: 195 ft (59 m)
- Coordinates: 53°35′29″N 007°38′34″W

Map
- Location of airport in Ireland

Runways
Direction	Length		Surface
Direction	m	ft	Surface
10/28	620	2,000	Bituminous
- Source: Irish AIS

Abbeyshrule Aerodrome is a small private airfield located in south-east County Longford, Ireland, near the village of Abbeyshrule, 12 NM (22 km; 14 mi) west north-west of Mullingar and beside the River Inny and the Royal Canal.

Located near the centre of Ireland, the aerodrome is situated in uncontrolled airspace and is clear of restricted areas. The airfield is primarily used for leisure flights and is situated between urban centres such as Athlone, Longford and Mullingar.

The original grass airstrip at Abbeyshrule operated from 1955 to 1959, before being revived by Jimmy Byrne in the early 1970s. In 1977 a new runway was laid at the present site. The bituminous runway is 620 by 18 m (2,034 by 59 ft).

Two Registered Training Facilities (RTF), Aeroclub 2000 and Skyline Flying Club, are located at the aerodrome, as are several general aviation aircraft, including a Malmö MFI-9 Junior.
