= Matt Devlin =

Matt Devlin may refer to:

- Matt Devlin (Irish republican) (1950–2005), member of the Provisional Irish Republican Army
- Matt Devlin (sportscaster), American sportscaster & TV play-by-play announcer for the Toronto Raptors of the NBA
- Matt Devlin, a fictional character on the British television drama Law & Order: UK portrayed by Jamie Bamber
