= R393 road (Ireland) =

Road in Ireland

R393 road
- Bóthar R393
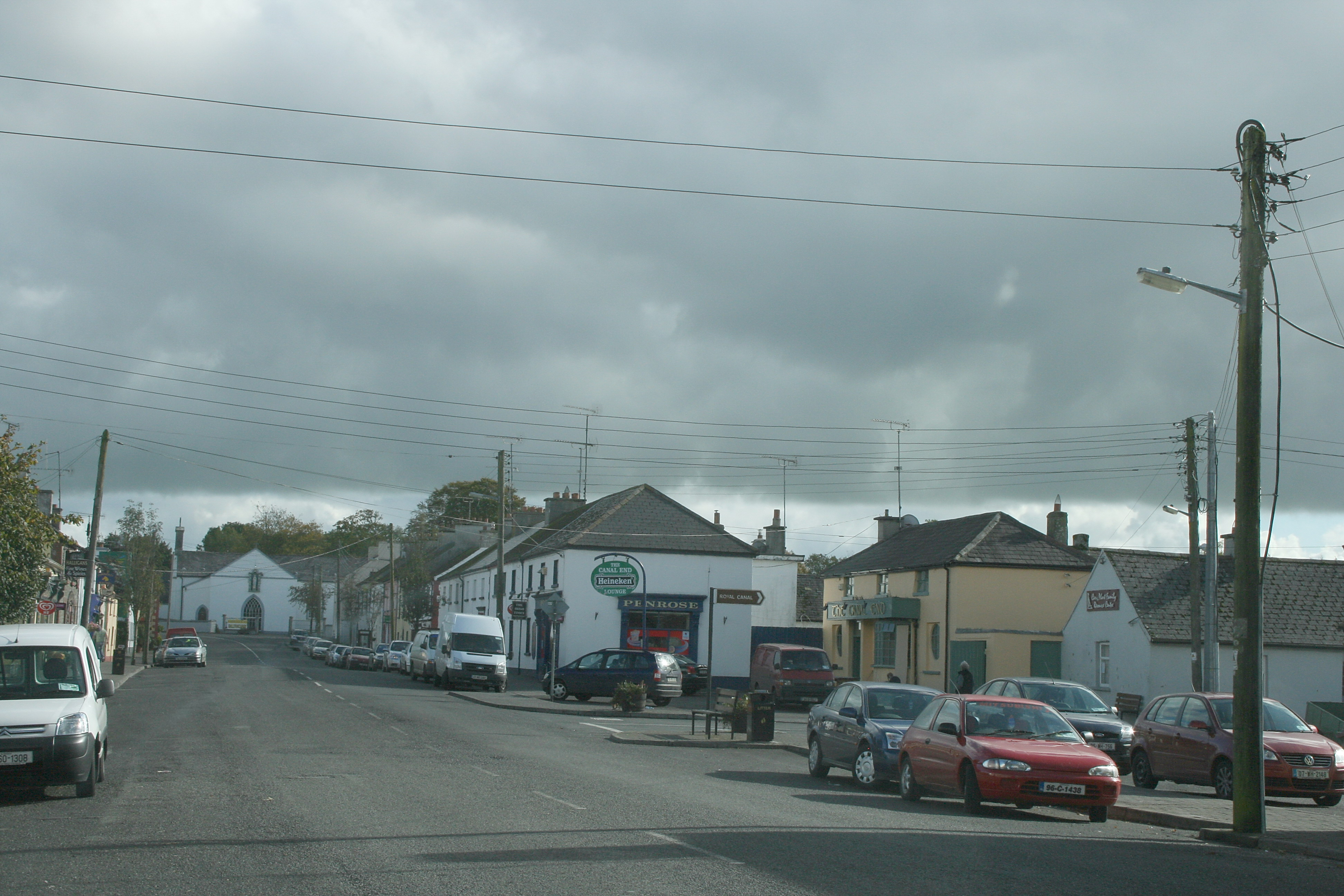
- R393 through Ballinacargy

Route information
- Length: 43 km (27 mi)

Location
- Country: Ireland
- Primary destinations: County Longford; Longford town leaves the N4; Crosses the Dublin-Sligo railway line; Carrickboy – (N55); (R399); Crosses the River Inny; County Westmeath; Ballynacargy; Mullingar – terminates at the R394

Highway system
- Roads in Ireland; Motorways; Primary; Secondary; Regional

The R393 road is a regional road in Ireland linking Longford to Mullingar in County Westmeath.

Its route runs north of the Royal Canal and south of the N4 national primary road – both of which also join Longford to Mullingar, as does the Dublin-Sligo railway line.

The road is 43 km (27 mi) long.

== See also ==
- Roads in Ireland
- National primary road
- National secondary road
