= N55 road (Ireland) =

Road in Ireland

N55 road
- Bóthar N55
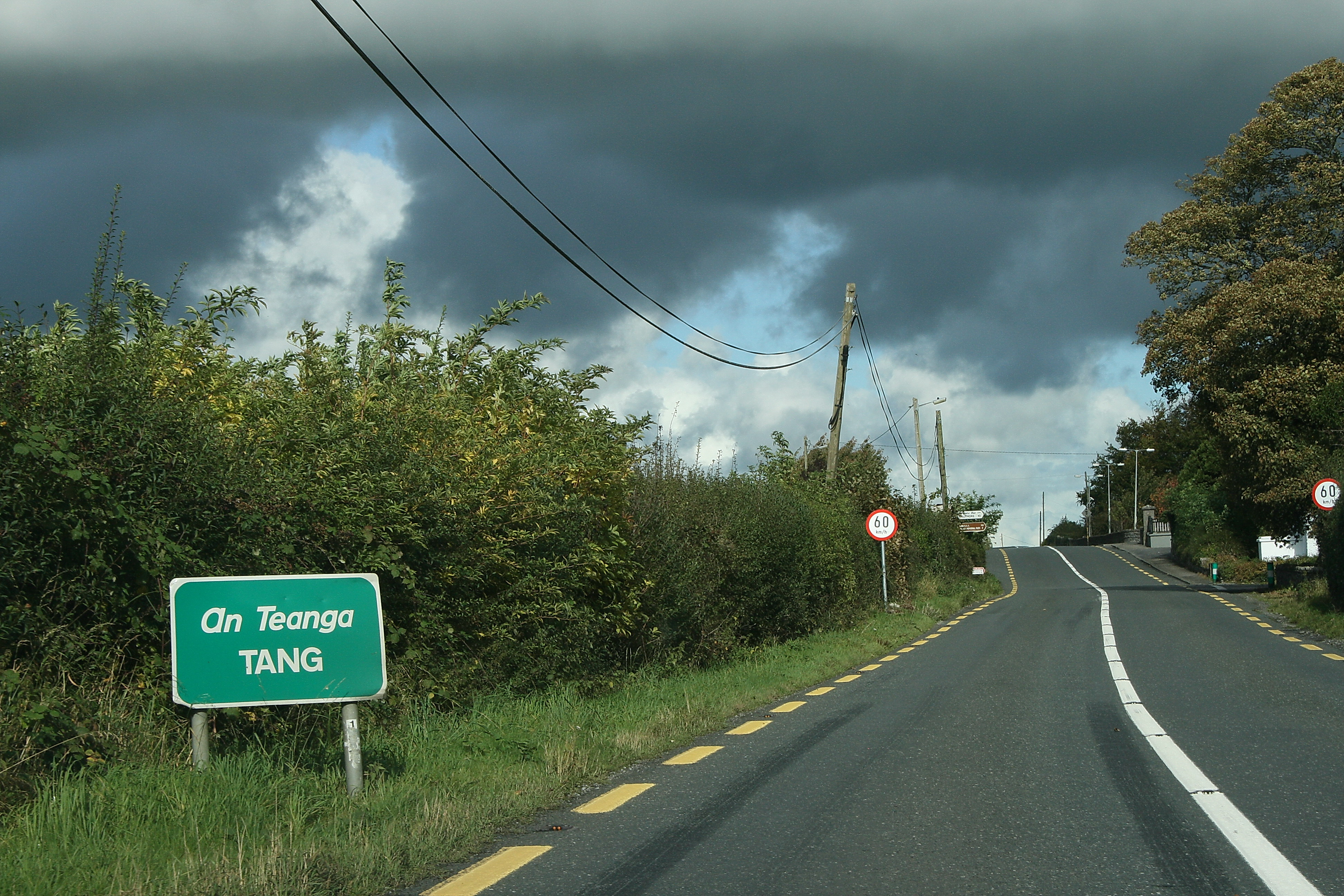
- N55 at Tang, County Westmeath

Route information
- Length: 78.815 km (48.973 mi)

Location
- Country: Ireland
- Primary destinations: County Westmeath; Athlone, leaves N6; (R390); Ballykeeran; Glassan; Tubberclare; Tang; County Longford; Ballymahon - joined/left by R392; Crosses the Royal Canal; (R399); Carrickboy - (R393); Edgeworthstown - crosses the Dublin-Sligo railway line; joins/leaves the N4; Granard - joined/left by the R194; County Cavan; (R394); Bellananagh - (R394); Cavan - terminates at junction with the N3

Highway system
- Roads in Ireland; Motorways; Primary; Secondary; Regional

The N55 road is a national secondary road in Ireland linking Athlone to Cavan town.

== Athlone - Ballymahon upgrade ==
In October 2017, a public consultation began into the re-routing of the Athlone to Ballymahon section of the road. The route affects areas such as Annaghgortagh, and Kilkenny West Plans were still in development in summer 2018.

== Route ==
(Southwest to Northeast)

- It starts at a grade separated interchange (Junction 4) on the N6 Athlone by-pass in County Westmeath and runs northwest through Ballymahon, crossing the N4 at Edgeworthstown, County Longford, through Granard, County Longford and northwest to Ballinagh, County Cavan before terminating at a roundabout junction with the N3 in Cavan town.

== See also ==
- Roads in Ireland
