= Bellanagare Bog =

Ecological site in County Roscommon, Ireland

- Portach Baile an Turlaigh
- Location within Ireland
- Location: County Roscommon, Ireland
- Nearest city: Castlerea, County Roscommon
- Coordinates: 53°49′39″N 8°26′6″W
- Area: 1,203.73 ha (2,974.5 acres)
- Governing body: National Parks and Wildlife Service

The Bellanagare Bog (Irish: Portach Baile an Turlaigh) Special Area of Conservation (or SAC) is a Natura 2000 site in County Roscommon, Ireland. The qualifying interests by which it is protected as an SAC are the presence of three habitat types: the presence of active raised bog (priority habitat), the presence of degraded raised bogs still capable of natural regeneration, and the presence of depressions on peat substrates of Rhynchosporion vegetation.

== Location ==
The Bellanagare Bog SAC is to the west of the village of Bellanagare, close to Castlerea, County Roscommon, in the townlands of Arraghan, Brackloon (Electoral District (E.D) Baslick), Cloonfinglas, Cloonsheever, Cornamucklagh and Falmore, Derreen (E.D. Bellanagare), Knockroe (E.D. Bellanagare), Leggatinty, Leitrim (E.D. Fairymount), Lugakeeran, Mullen and Tully (E.D. Baslick). Schedule 1 of the Statutory Instrument for this site identifies it as encompassing an area of 1203.73 hectares.

The Irish name of the Bellanagare Bog SAC is given in the Statutory Instrument for the site as Irish: Limistéir faoi Chaomhnú Speisialta (LCS) Phortach Bhaile an Turlaigh. There does not appear to be a townland of that specific name in the area, but there is a townland called Tully at the south-east of the site. The name of the general area is Bellanagare Bog in English or in Irish: Portach Bhéal Átha na gCarr.

There are several monuments recorded in the vicinity of the SAC, including ringforts, souterrains and enclosures.

== SAC qualification ==
Under the European Union Habitats Directive and the Irish regulations which implement this Directive (European Communities (Birds and Natural Habitats) Regulations 2011 (S.I. No. 477 of 2011), Ireland is required to designate a range of habitats as SACs to protect them. Ireland has designated an area of approximately 13,500 km^{2} as SACs to date, including land, lakes and marine habitats. One of the roles of the Irish National Parks and Wildlife Service (NPWS) is to designate and advise on such SACs and other protected sites. Details of the Bellanagare Bog SAC can be found on their website. The Bellanagare Bog site was proposed as a Site of Community Importance in May 1998, and was designated as a Natura 2000 site in 2003 under the Habitats Directive. Statutory Instrument No. 763 of 2021, establishing the site as an SAC (Site code: 000592), was passed in 2021. The three features which qualify this site for an SAC designation are the presence of specific protected habitat types. These three habitats are:

- Active raised bogs (Natura 2000 code 7110; priority habitat)
- Degraded raised bogs still capable of natural regeneration (Natura 2000 code 7120)
- Rhynchosporion vegetation/Depressions on peat substrates of the Rhynchosporion (Natura 2000 code 7150).

=== Site description ===
The Bellanagare Bog site is described as a western raised bog raised bog as it includes the features of both raised bog and blanket bog. Alternative names for this habitat type are transitional raised bog or intermediate raised bog. The underlying geology is muddy Carboniferous limestone. This has low permeability. The subsoil under the bog is primarily clayey limestone till.

Bellanagare Bog is situated in an upland area. Several streams rise within the bounds of the site, including the Frances River. The bog has an undulating surface. The peat is to be found on ridges, separated by flushes. It is noted in the site synopsis for Bellanagare Bog SAC that the range of flushes found at the site is notable. A flush is the wetland habitat associated with a seepage, and a seepage is where groundwater emerges at the ground surface across a diffuse area, typically forming a permanently wet area on a slope. These flushes, usually located in depressions, are plentiful at the site.

Flush types on the site include an in-filling lake, an extensive Purple Moor-grass (Molinia caerulea) flush with a high diversity of plant species, a large swallow-hole flush, and flushes associated with springs, rises and streams. One flush is coincident with a bog burst. The site also includes much cut-away bog, small areas of heath, scrub, wet grassland and several small conifer plantations.

Several tracks run through the site. A large amount of the bog is in state ownership. A population of Red Grouse (Lagopus lagopus hibernicus), a bird species which is red-listed under the Birds of Conservation Concern in Ireland review, is noted at this site. The NPWS site synopsis for Bellanagare Bog SAC describes the ecological value and significance of the site thus:

”For a raised bog, Bellanagare Bog is floristically unusual, supporting species typically found on raised bogs as well as species more usually found on blanket bogs. Bellanagare Bog is of considerable scientific and conservation significance, in particular for its status as an intermediate raised bog, but also for the wide variety of flush types found, as well as for its large size and for the presence of scarce plant species. Raised bogs are rare and threatened in Europe, and are listed as a priority habitat on Annex I of the E.U. Habitats Directive.”

=== Active raised bog ===
Of the three habitats which qualify the site for SAC status, the active bog priority habitat consists of high bog which is wet and actively peat-forming. There is a high proportion of cover by bog mosses or Sphagnum spp. Some typical features of active raised bogs occur here, including hummocks, pools, wet flats, Sphagnum lawns, flushes and/or soaks. Indicator species of midland raised bogs such as are present, though they are not as common as in raised bogs further east in the country. Species occurring at this raised bog habitat such as Bog-rosemary (Andromeda polifolia) and the bog moss Sphagnum magellanicum, but in fewer numbers in this western bog than is typical in midlands raised bogs.

=== Degraded raised bog ===
The degraded raised bog habitat consists of high bog where peat cutting, drainage and other land use activities have had a negative impact, but which retain the potential to regenerate. This habitat type is the predominant habitat in the high bog at Bellanagare. It is typically drier than the active bog habitat, and does not include many pools. The plant species occurring in this habitat include Cross-leaved Heath (Erica tetralix), Heather (Calluna vulgaris), Common Cottongrass (Eriophorum angustifolium), Bog Asphodel (Narthecium ossifragum), Carnation Sedge (Carex panicea) and Deergrass. The cover of bog mosses is relatively low in areas of degraded bog and there are few wet pool areas.

=== Rhynchosporion vegetation ===
The third SAC qualifying habitat at the Bellanagare Bog site – Rhynchosporion vegetation – is to be found in wet depressions, pool edges and erosion channels. This vegetation includes species such as white beak-sedge (Rhynchospora alba) and/or brown beak-sedge (Rhynchospora fusca). This habitat should also include plant species including Bog Asphodel (Narthecium ossifragum), species of sundew (Drosera spp.), Deergrass (Scirpus cespitosus) and carnation sedge (Carex panicea).

== Other Protected Sites status for Bellanagare Bog ==
Under the Birds Directive, Ireland has designated over 597,000 hectares of land as Special Protection Areas to protect listed rare and vulnerable species, regularly occurring migratory species and wetlands (especially those of international importance). As well as being an SAC, Bellanagare Bog has Special Protection Area status, under the qualifying interest of:

- Greenland white-fronted goose (Anser albifrons flavirostris) [A395]

This species, a subspecies of the greater white-fronted goose, is a winter visitor to Ireland. It is one of the rarest geese in Europe and has Amber conservation status in Ireland and the United Kingdom. The Site Synopsis for the Bellanagare Bog SPA notes that the when the site was designated as an SPA, it was a habitat for an internationally significant flock of Greenland White-Fronted Geese. However, this flock had changed grazing site in recent years from the peatlands of this site to grazing at intensively managed grassland instead. The cause for the change in site is not noted. The NPWS conservation objective for this species at Bellanagare Bog SPA is to "maintain or restore the favourable conservation condition of the bird species listed as Special Conservation Interests for this SPA".

The National Parks and Wildlife Service (NPWS) has included the Bellanagare Bog site as a proposed Natural Heritage Area or pNHA. Other pNHA sites in the area include Cloonshanville Bog, Lough Gara and Lough Glinn.

== Conservation objectives ==
The National Parks and Wildlife Service conservation objectives for the Bellanagare Bog SAC are available from the NPWS website. The primary conservation objective for the active raised bog habitat is to restore the favourable conservation condition of Active raised bogs in Bellanagare Bog. The conservation status for the degraded raised bog and Rhynchosporion vegetation components of the site is regarded as linked to that of the raised bog component, and thus separate conservation objectives for these two components have not been set.

The conservation objective for the habitat area is to restore the area of active raised bog from the area mapped in 2014 (49.6 hectares) to a target area of 139.1 hectares, subject to natural processes. Of the area of degraded raised bog mapped in 2014 (105.4 hectares), approximately 73.8 hectares is expected to be restorable by drain blocking (a standard method of rewetting and restoring bogland). With the 49.6 hectares of active raised bog, this allows for a target potential active raised bog area of 123.4 hectares. A further 15.7 hectares of bog-forming habitat is estimated to be restorable from the cutover area of the bog, giving a final target of 139.1 hectares. The conservation of the site should also include restoration of the habitat distribution, including the central and subcentral ecotope, active flush and the soak system. The area of high bog at the site should be maintained at 879.1 hectares or to an area required for development and maintenance of the active raised bog.

According to the conservation objectives, seasonal fluctuations in water levels at the bog should not exceed 20 cm, and should be 10 cm below the bog surface. Due to previous drainage and peat-cutting activity, the margins of the active raised bog no longer contain natural marginal habitats. The restoration of these transitional areas between the high bog and adjacent mineral soils is a further conservation objective. Regarding restoration of the quality of vegetation at the Bellanagare site, 69.6 hectares of the central ecotope, active flush, soaks and bog woodland should be restored so that at least 50% of the active raised bog habitat is of high quality. The presence of active flush, indicating high quality active raised bog, should be maintained. This site includes active flush: the mid-eastern aspect of the bog includes a flush which consists of an infilling lake or soak, with 76-90% Sphagnum cover.

A restoration plan for Bellanagare Bog SAC was published in 2023 by the National Parks and Wildlife Service. In line with the site-specific conservation objectives and with best practice in restoration of such habitats, the measures to be taken to restore and manage this raised bog habitat include:

- Drain blocking (includes drains on both high bog and the margins)
- Removal of forestry/tree clearance
- Installation of marginal dams
- High bog excavation/re-profiling
- Inoculation with Sphagnum species, and
- Bunding on high bog or cutover bog.

To date, there has been limited progress in achieving these measures, but in the 2023 NPWS restoration plan, it is noted that preparatory measures are in hand.

== Conservation threats ==
=== Water loss ===
The NPWS site synopsis notes that water loss is a threat for this site, with two primary causes: a considerable drain network to the northern half of the bog, and the occurrence of active peat-cutting across the site. A derogation on peat-cutting had been granted for this and other peatland sites in 1999, and this came to an end in 2008, as damage to the selected areas was ongoing at a rate of 2-4% per annum. At the time, these were candidate SACs rather than fully designated SACs. A scheme to compensate those affected by the cessation of peat-cutting at this and other SAC and Natural Heritage Area (NHA) sites was implemented, initially including SAC sites but extended in 2014 to include NHA sites. This scheme included options for people with turf-cutting rights on these sites which included:

- Annual Payment Scheme (A payment of €1,500 per annum (index linked) for 15 years together with a once-off incentive payment of €500) further to the signing of a legal agreement with the Minister.

Or

- Bog Relocation Scheme (where feasible, qualifying applicants will be facilitated in relocating to non-designated sites to continue turf cutting)

Those who opted for the Bog Relocation Scheme could avail of an interim arrangement, while awaiting the investigation and preparation of alternative peat-cutting sites, to receive the Annual Payment Scheme, or to receive an annual supply of 15 tonnes of cut turf delivered to their homes.

In 2012, the Minister for Arts, Heritage and the Gaeltacht, noted in a Dáil debate that "In County Roscommon, 97 applications for compensation have been received relating to Bellanagare Bog and 9 applicants have received payment to date". In December 2019, the Minister for Culture, Heritage and the Gaeltacht noted in Dáil Éireann (the lower house of the Irish legislature) that 182 applicants to the Turf Cutting Cessation Scheme for Bellanagare Bog were regularly receiving annual payments and that 10 applicants who regularly received annual payments had applied for relocation. Data on the Cessation of Turf Cutting Compensation Scheme Statistics for SACs dataset, updated to 2021, indicates that there were 228 applications for the compensation scheme for Bellanagare Bog, of which 21 applicants requested relocation. There were 152 legal agreement payments recorded, turf deliveries were made to 12 applicants in year 6 of the scheme, 161 applicants received payment in year 6 of the scheme and 106 applicants received payments in year 7 of the scheme. An investigation into peat-cutting on SAC sites carried out in 2022 showed that cutting was being carried out at the active raised bog at Bellanagare Bog SAC between 2012 and 2021, with 13 plots cut in 2012, increasing to 40 plots in 2017 and decreasing to 11 plots cut in 2021.

=== Fire ===
A further threat to the site is the risk of fires, as this is described as quite a dry bog. The Bellanagare Bog SAC Restoration Plan proposes the development of a fire prevention and control plan, in conjunction with local stakeholders.

=== Protected Species ===
The Bellanagare Bog Site is a Special Protection Area (or SPA) for the Greenland White-fronted Goose (Anser albifrons flavirostris). In 2024, a legal case was taken against An Bórd Pleanála regarding a plan to install a 21 light floodlighting development at a local school 3 kilometres away from the SPA/SAC. The judgment ruled that the assessment that the development would not impact the geese (which were typically not using that site at the time of judgment) did not sit well with the terms of the SPA conservation objectives and that any development should consider protected species currently at the site but should also not adversely affect the potential future return of the species to the site.

In this case, referencing Article 6(3) of the Habitats Directive and the conservation objectives of the SPA, it was concluded by the judge that:

"the Board failed to properly apply the relevant provisions of Article 6(3) in not carrying out any or any proper or sufficient screening for appropriate assessment, in spite of the expression of reasonable scientific doubt of the possible impact of the development on the neighbouring Bellanagare Bog SPA, on the restoration of favourable conservative status there for the geese. The Board failed to consider and address whether the development may influence any potential future return of the geese to the Bellanagare Bog SPA."

== See also ==
- List of bogs
- List of Special Areas of Conservation in the Republic of Ireland
- List of Special Protection Areas in the Republic of Ireland

== Literature ==
- Fernandez, F., Connolly K., Crowley W., Denyer J., Duff K. & Smith G. (2014) Raised bog monitoring and assessment survey 2013. Irish Wildlife Manuals, No. 81. National Parks and Wildlife Service, Department of Arts, Heritage and Gaeltacht, Dublin, Ireland.
- Smith, G.F. & Crowley, W. (2020) The habitats of cutover raised bog. Irish Wildlife Manuals, No. 128. National Parks and Wildlife Service, Department of Housing, Local Government and Heritage, Ireland.
- Foss, P.J., Crushell, P. & Gallagher, M.C. (2017) Counties Longford & Roscommon Wetland Study. Report prepared for Longford and Roscommon County Councils
- Catherine O'Connell: Conservation and Management of Raised Bogs in Ireland. 14th International Peat Congress, 1998.
