= R399 road (Ireland) =

Road in Ireland

R399 road
- Bóthar R399
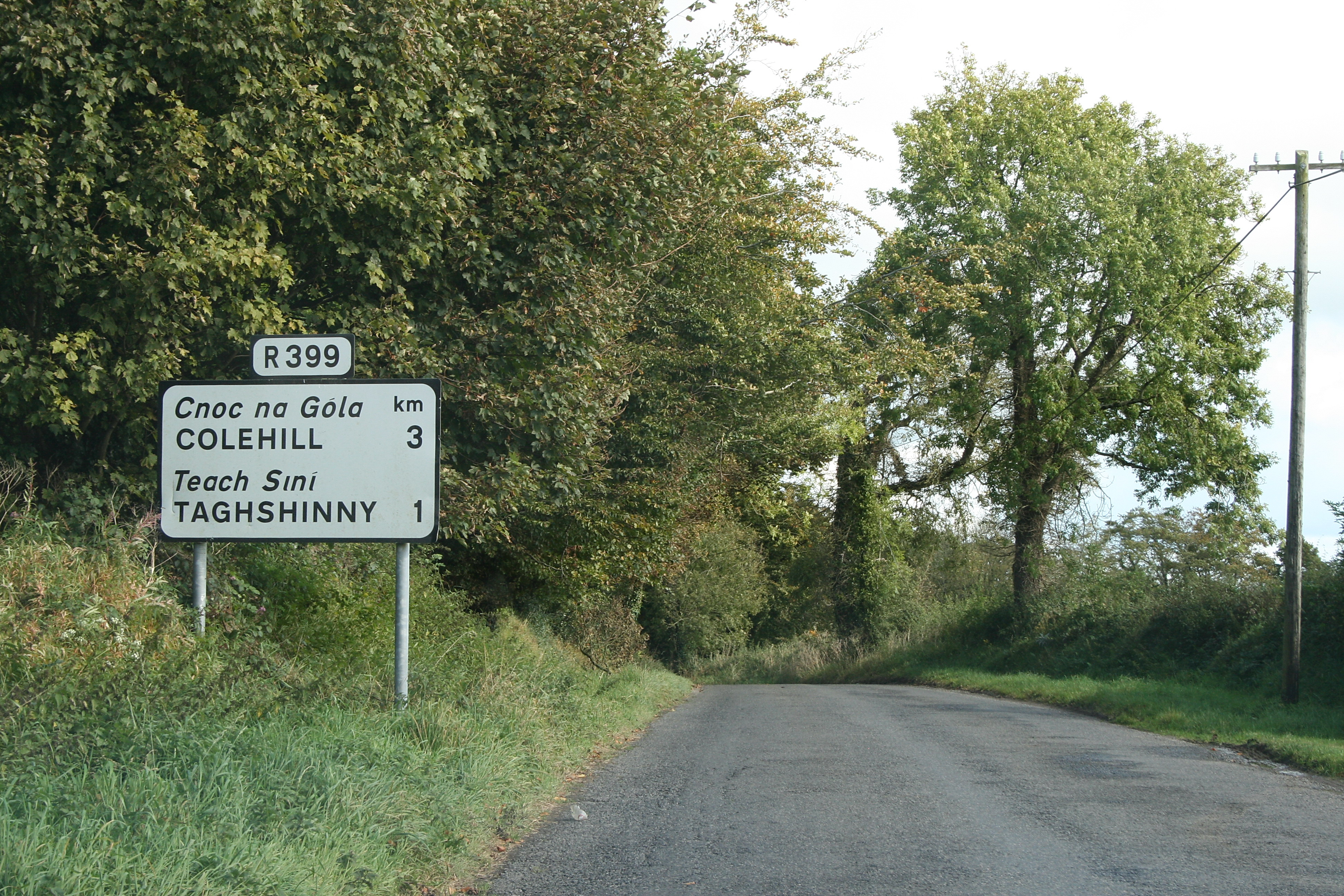
- Leaving the N55

Route information
- Length: 5 km (3.1 mi)

Location
- Country: Ireland
- Primary destinations: County Longford; Leaves the N55; Taghshinny; Colehill; Abbeyshrule (canal and airport) via 2 km of local road; Terminates at the R393

Highway system
- Roads in Ireland; Motorways; Primary; Secondary; Regional

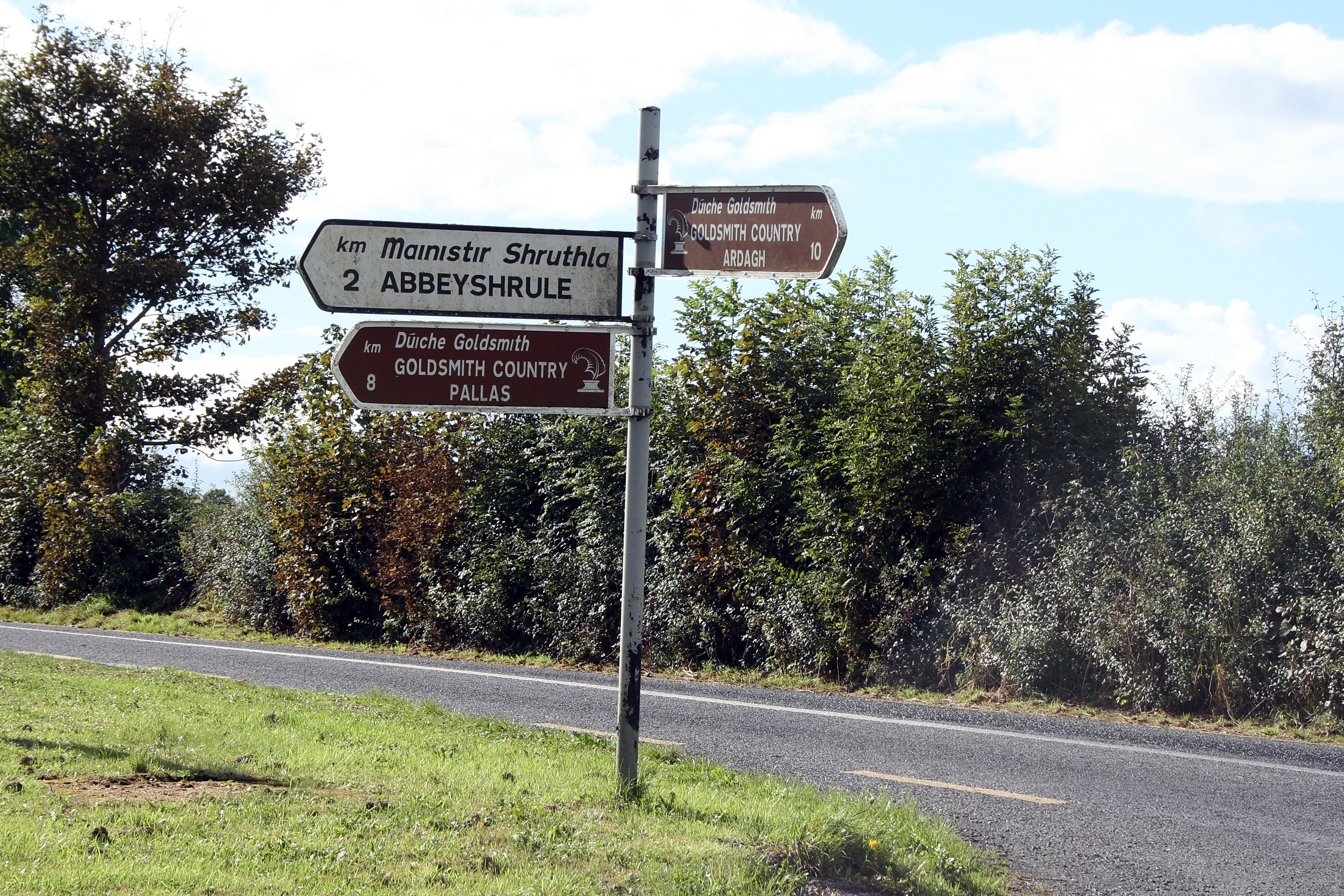
Towards Longford Airport

The R399 road is a short regional road in Ireland linking the N55 to the R393; all in County Longford.

Its route runs north of the Royal Canal. Abbeyshrule, situated on the canal and Abbeyshrule airport are just off the R399 to the south. The road is 5 km (3.1 mi) long.

== See also ==
- Roads in Ireland
- National primary road
- National secondary road
