= Colehill, County Longford =

Village and townland in County Longford, Ireland

Coordinates: 53°35′N 7°39′W

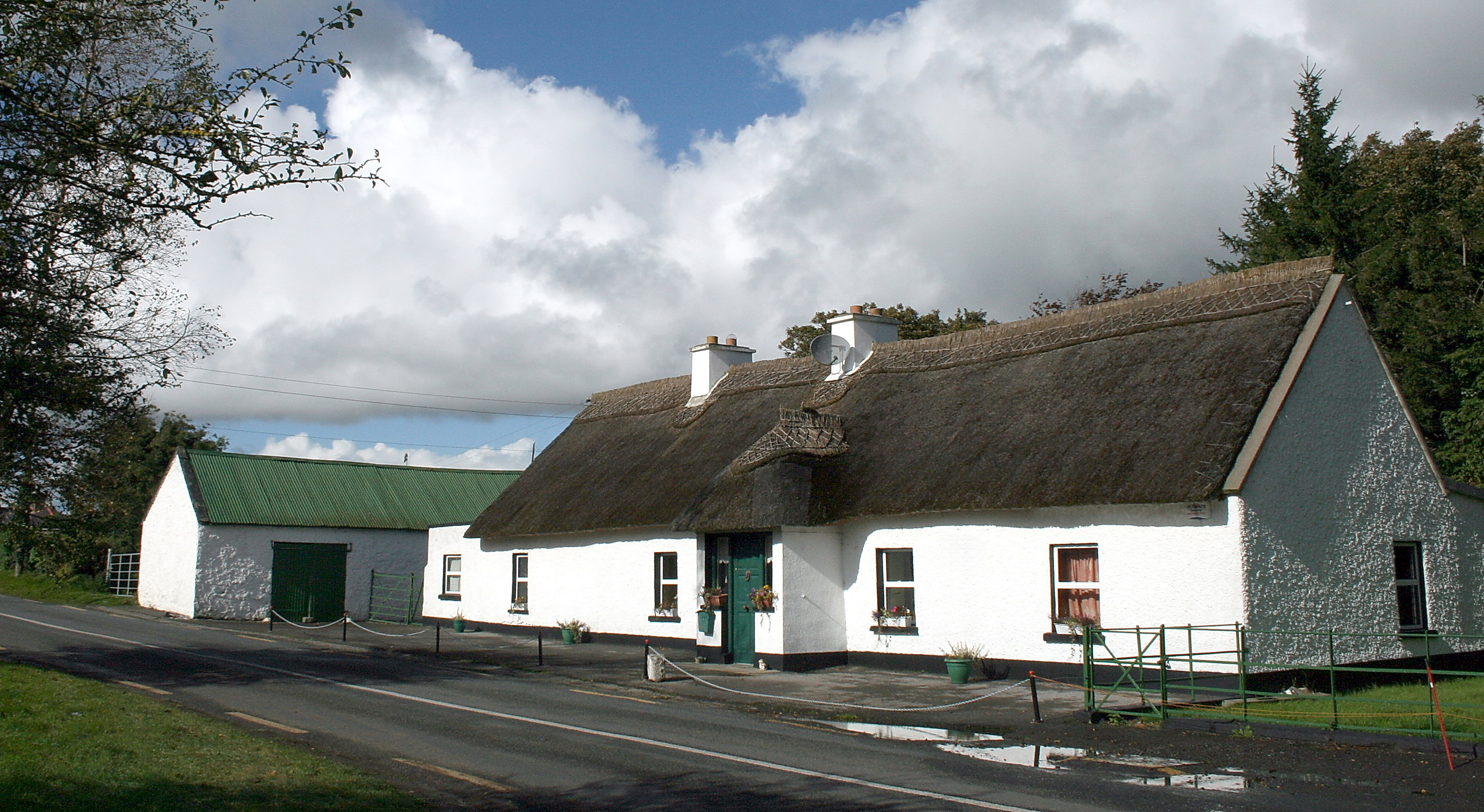
Colehill on the R399

Colehill (Irish: Cnoc na Góla) is a village and townland in south-east County Longford, Ireland. Its Irish name was historically anglicised as Knocknagoal and Knocknagole.

It lies on the R399 regional road.

== See also ==
- List of towns and villages in Ireland
