= Mark Walker (British Army officer) =

British Army general and recipient of the Victoria Cross

General Sir Mark Walker VC KCB
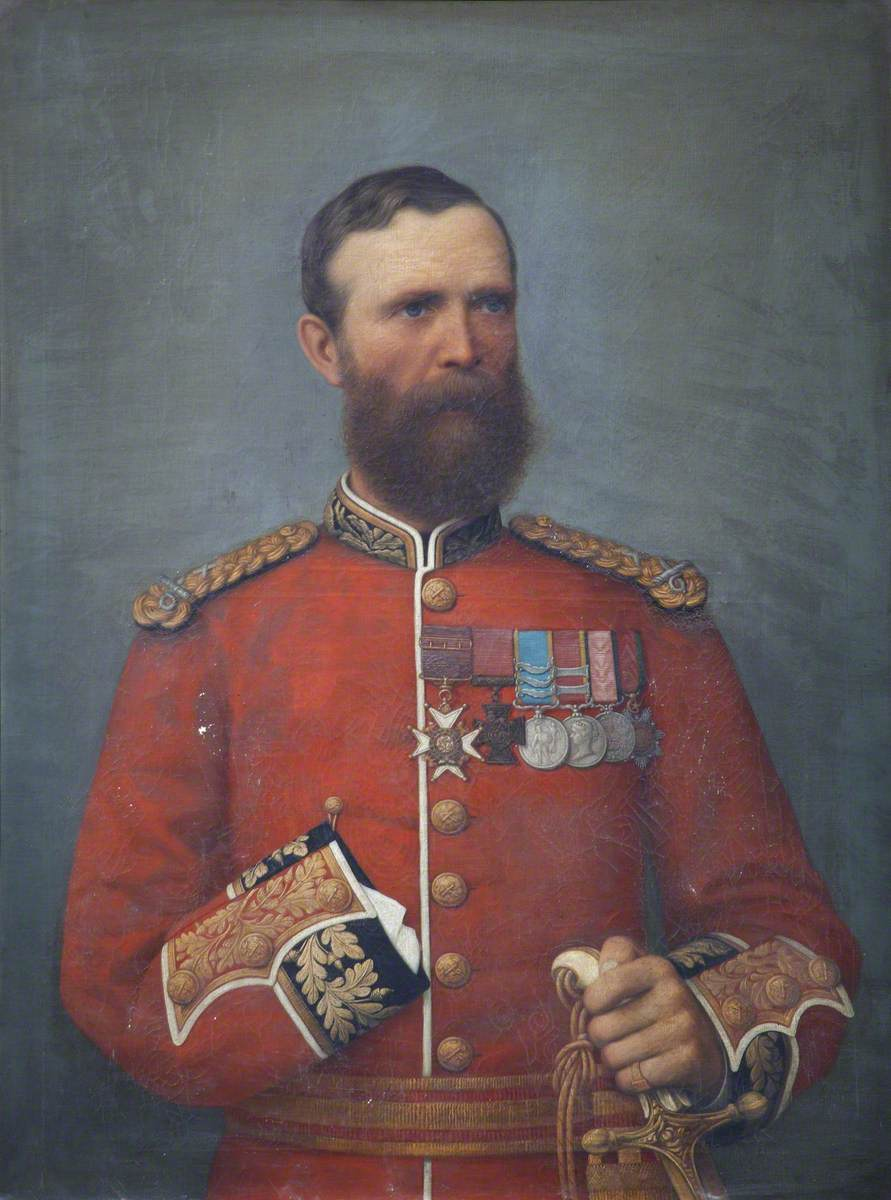
- Walker in around 1891, by an unknown artist
- Born: 27 November 1827; Finea, County Westmeath, Ireland
- Died: 18 July 1902 (aged 74); Arlington Rectory, Devon, England
- Burial place: Cheriton Road Cemetery, Folkestone
- Relatives: Sir Samuel Walker, 1st Baronet
- Military career
- Allegiance: United Kingdom
- Branch: British Army
- Service years: 1846–1893
- Rank: General
- Units: 30th Regiment of Foot; 3rd Regiment of Foot
- Conflicts: Crimean War; Second Opium War
- Awards: Victoria Cross; Knight Commander of the Order of the Bath; Order of the Medjidie, 5th Class (Ottoman Empire)
- Other work: Honorary Colonel of the Sherwood Foresters

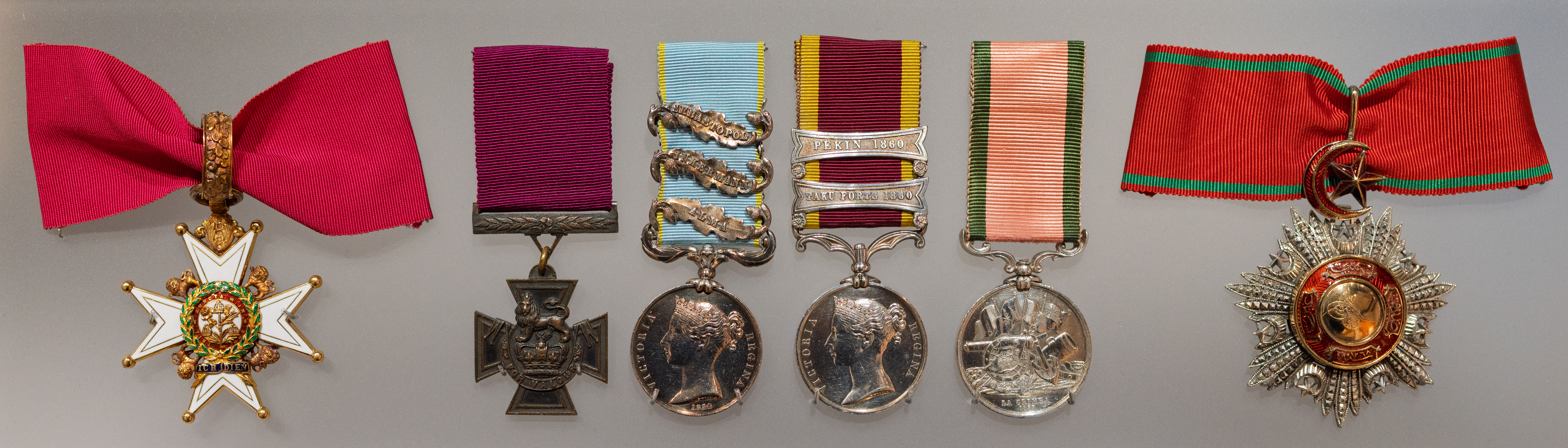
Medals awarded to Walker. From left to right: Knight Commander, Order of the Bath; Victoria Cross; Crimea Medal; Second China War Medal; Turkish Crimea Medal; Order of the Medjidie, 5th Class

General Sir Mark Walker, VC, KCB (24 November 1827 – 18 July 1902) was a British Army officer and an Irish recipient of the Victoria Cross, the highest award for gallantry in the face of the enemy that can be awarded to British and Commonwealth forces.

== Early life ==
Walker was born in Gore Port, Finea, County Westmeath in Ireland, the son of Captain Alexander Walker and Elizabeth Elliott. His younger brother was Sir Samuel Walker, 1st Baronet QC, Liberal MP for Londonderry, Solicitor-General for Ireland, Attorney-General for Ireland and Lord Chancellor of Ireland.

== Victoria Cross ==
During the Crimean War, Walker was a 26-year-old lieutenant in the 30th Regiment of Foot (later the East Lancashire Regiment) British Army when the deed for which he was awarded the VC was performed.

On 5 November 1854 at Inkerman, Crimea, Lieutenant Walker jumped over a wall in the face of two battalions of Russian Infantry which were marching towards it. This act was to encourage the men, by example, to advance against such odds – which they did and succeeded in driving back both battalions.

His Victoria Cross was until recently on display at The Buffs Regimental Museum, Canterbury, England. With the rest of that museum's collections, it has now been transferred to the National Army Museum. The medal is on display in the museums Conflict in Europe gallery

== Later life ==
He was wounded by a howitzer shell during his service in the Crimea which resulted in the amputation of his right arm. He served through the Second Anglo-Chinese War of 1860 as brigade major, and in 1861 he received the rank of lieutenant-colonel. Promotion to colonel followed in 1869, and from 1875 to 1879 he commanded a brigade in Madras, during which he was promoted to major-general in 1878. From 1883 to 1884 he was at Aldershot, then in command of a brigade at Gibraltar until 16 December 1888, when he was promoted to lieutenant general.

He retired from the army with the rank of general in 1893, and was appointed a Knight Commander of the Order of the Bath.

From 1900 until his death he was colonel of the Sherwood Foresters.

He died at Arlington, Devon, England on 18 July 1902.

A memorial wall plaque honouring Sir Mark is found at Canterbury Cathedral.

== Personal life ==
In 1881 Walker married Catherine Chichester.
