= Lough Kinale =

Lake on the River Inny, Ireland

- Loch Cinnéile (Irish)
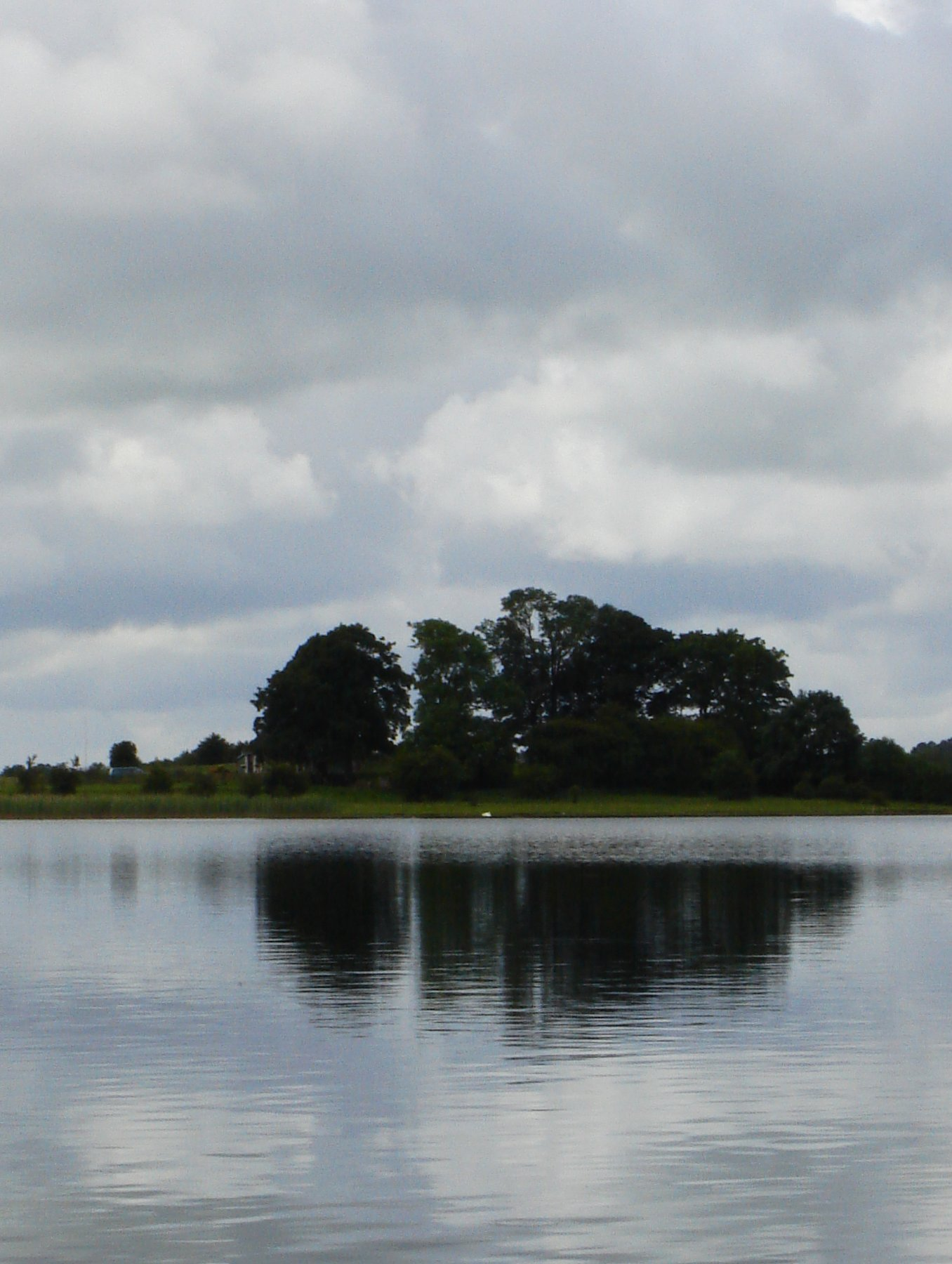

- Location in Ireland
- Location: County Longford, County Westmeath, County Cavan
- Coordinates: 53°46′31″N 7°25′0″W
- Primary inflows: River Inny
- Primary outflows: River Inny
- Catchment area: 263.37 km^{2} (101.7 sq mi)
- Basin countries: Ireland
- Max. length: 2.4 km (1.5 mi)
- Max. width: 1.1 km (1 mi)
- Surface area: 1.95 km^{2} (0.75 sq mi)
- Surface elevation: 62 m (203 ft)

Lough Kinale (/lɒx kineɪl/, lokh kin-AIL; Irish: Loch Cinnéile) is a freshwater lake in the north midlands of Ireland. It is located on the borders of counties Longford, Westmeath and Cavan. Lough Kinale forms part of the River Inny. The lake's inflow is from Lough Sheelin and the outflow is to Lough Derravaragh. The neighbouring (but much smaller) Derragh Lough is also connected by a river to Lough Kinale.

== Geography ==
Lough Kinale measures about 2 km (1.2 mi) long and 1 km (0.6 mi) wide. The majority of the lake is in County Longford. The lake lies about 10 km (6 mi) east of Granard, and is roughly equidistant from Cavan town, Longford town and Mullingar (each around 25 kilometres (16 mi) distant). It is situated downstream from Lough Sheelin in the upper part of the catchment area of the River Inny, a main tributary of the River Shannon. A smaller lake, Lough Derragh, is linked to the outflow of the Inny River and Lough Kinale. It is a very shallow lake, with a maximum depth of around 4 m (13 ft). There are two parts, almost separated by a central swampy area. The margins of the lake have several reed beds, interspersed with calcium-rich marsh dominated by small sedges. The surrounding land has boggy areas, some of which have been converted to coniferous plantations. The water quality is variable, sometimes suffering from run-off of nutrients from agricultural land. At one time the lake was a trout fishery.

== Natural history ==
Lough Kinale is a noted coarse fishing destination with fish species including pike.

Lough Kinale is part of the Lough Kinale and Derragh Lough Special Protected Area (SPA). This is an important site for overwintering wildfowl, especially mute swan, pochard and tufted duck. The Eurasian coot is found here as well as smaller numbers of great crested grebe, little grebe and mallard. The birds fly back and forth between this lake and the much larger Lough Sheelin.

== Lough Kinale book shrine ==
A mediaeval book shrine (a decorative box for containing books) was discovered on the lake floor in 1986. It is unclear how it came to be in the lake. After decades of work by conservators, it went on display at the National Museum of Ireland in 2025.

== See also ==
- List of loughs in Ireland
