= Eirk Bog =

Nature reserve in County Kerry, Ireland

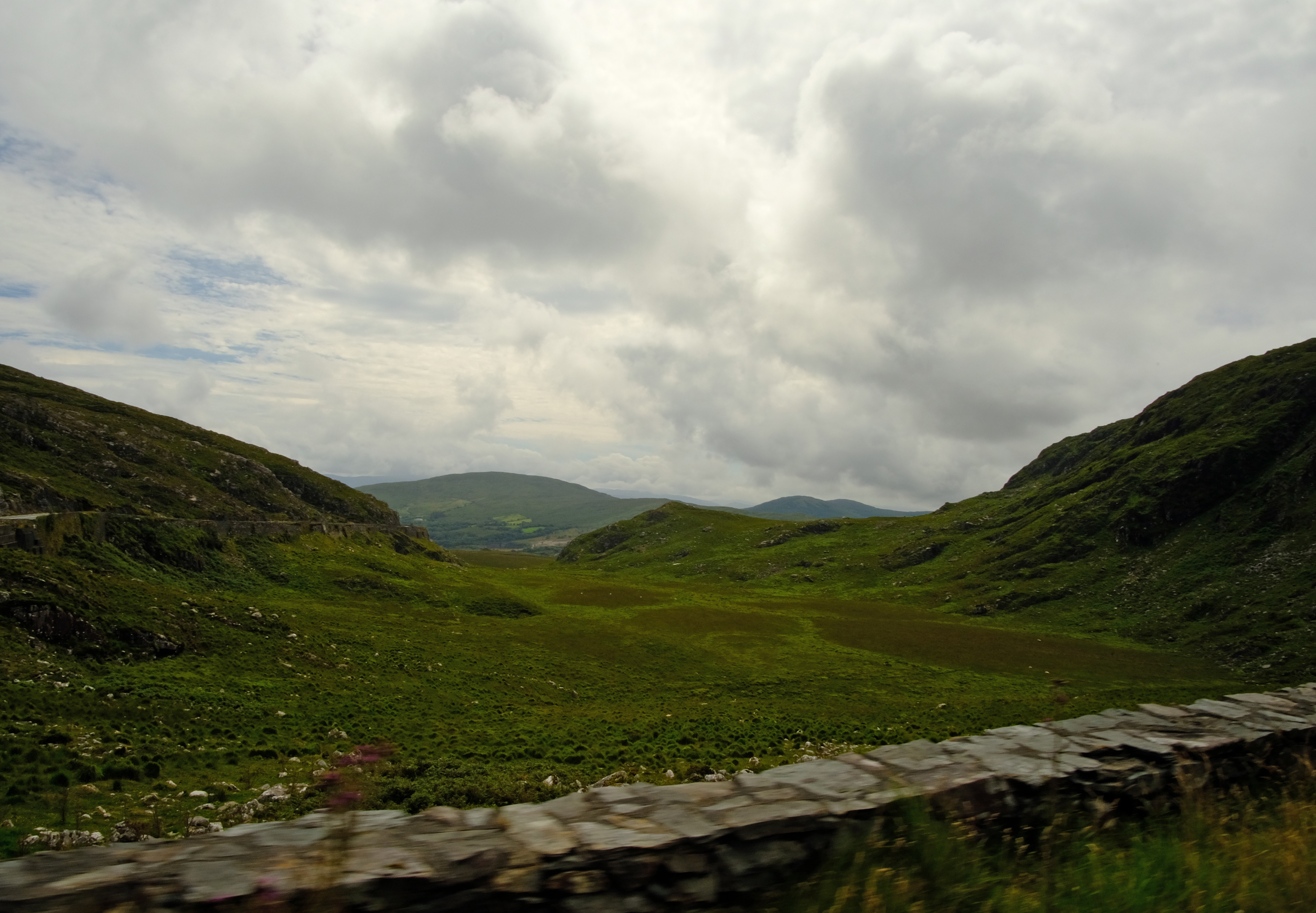
- Interactive map of Eirk Bog
- Location: County Kerry, Ireland
- Coordinates: 51°56′46″N 9°39′58″W
- Area: 40 acres (0.16 km^{2})
- Governing body: National Parks and Wildlife Service

Eirk Bog is a national nature reserve of approximately 40 acres (0.16 km^{2}) in County Kerry.

== Features ==
Eirk Bog was legally protected as a national nature reserve by the Irish government in 1986. It is also a Special Protection Area.

The Bog represents part of a well developed and relatively undisturbed intermediate bog, with a poor fen, Atlantic blanket bog, and wet heath land. The underlying geology of the site is old red sandstone. The Bog is the most southerly area in Ireland used by the Greenland white-fronted goose, and one of the few peatlands used by the birds as a feeding site.

In 2017, it was proposed that Eirk Bog be included in an extension of the UNESCO Killarney National Park Biosphere into a larger Kerry Biosphere.
