= Abbeyshrule =

Town in County Longford, Ireland

Abbeyshrule Mainistir Shruthla
- Village
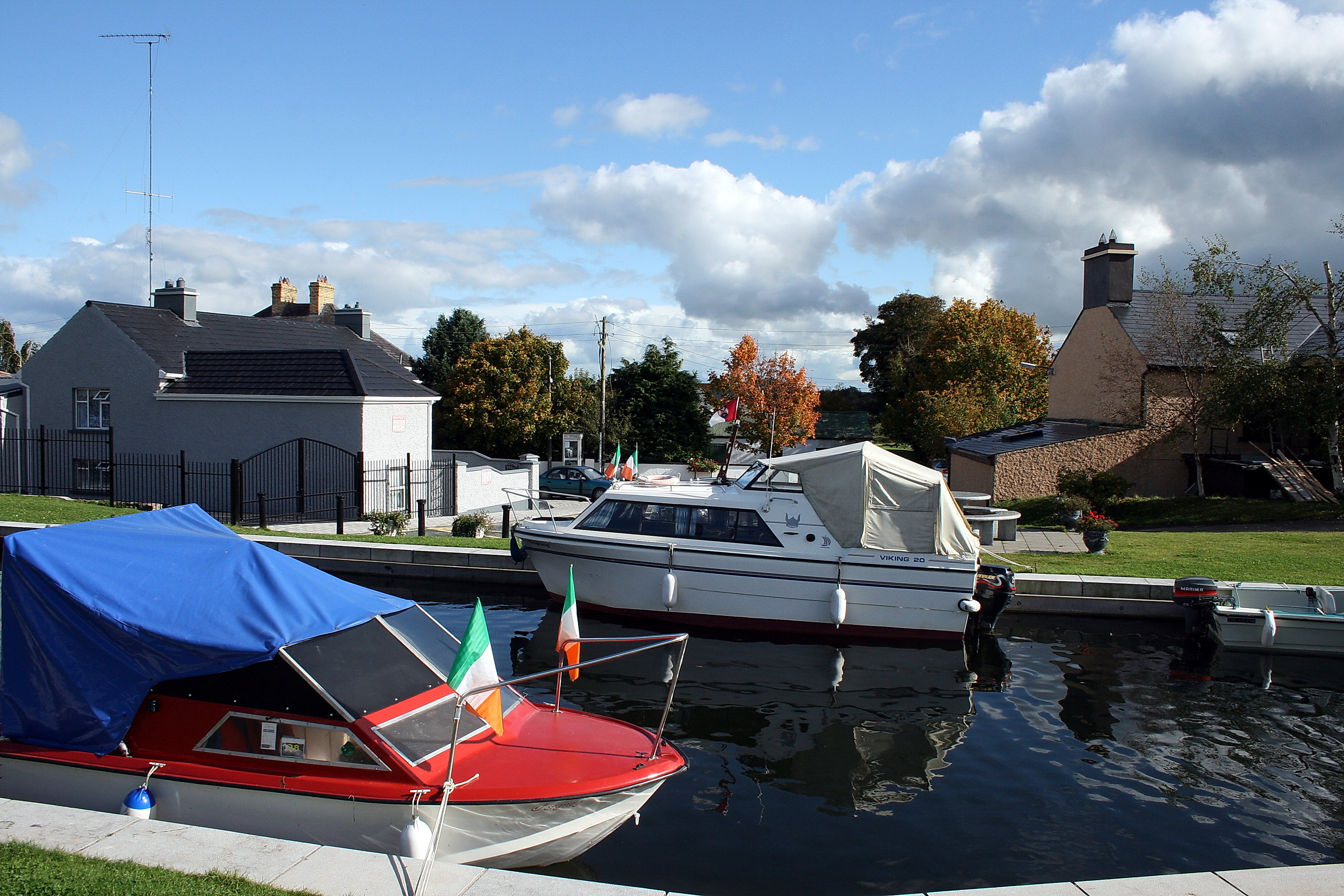
- The Royal Canal at Abbeyshrule

- Location in Ireland
- Coordinates: 53°35′00″N 7°39′00″W
- Country: Ireland
- Province: Leinster
- County: County Longford
- Elevation: 82 m (269 ft)

Population
  - Estimate (2012): 200
- Time zone: UTC+0 (WET)
  - Summer (DST): UTC-1 (IST (WEST))
- Irish Grid Reference: N213572

Abbeyshrule (Irish: Mainistir Shruthla, meaning 'monastery of the river') is a village in south-east County Longford, Ireland, on the River Inny and the Royal Canal. The village is in a civil parish of the same name.

== History ==
The village takes its name from the Irish language word for a river or stream (sruth) and from the early medieval Cistercian abbey, the ruins of which still survive on the banks of the Inny. While the original medieval settlement built up around this religious site and the nearby fording point on the river, a number of archaeological finds (including of the Clonbrin Shield in 1906) indicate activity in the area from at least the Bronze Age.

The building of the Royal Canal in the early nineteenth century, which required the construction of the Whitworth aqueduct across the Inny, brought increasing trade to the village until the mid twentieth century.

Abbeyshrule won the National Tidy Towns Award in 2012. The village, which also claimed the award for Ireland's Tidiest Village in 2012, subsequently won a Gold Medal Award at the European Entente Florale Competition.

== Notable people ==
The novelist, playwright and poet Oliver Goldsmith is believed to have been born in 1728 at Pallas, very near to the village, where his father resided as a local curate. The location is marked by a replica of the Goldsmith statue found at the entrance to Trinity College Dublin.

John Graham, a prolific author and senior officer of the Orange Order, was born here.

== Amenities ==
The village is located in the Irish midlands between Athlone, Longford and Mullingar.

The Abbeyshrule Aerodrome is located just outside the village, while the Royal Canal has been reopened to tourist water-borne traffic in recent years.

== See also ==
- List of towns and villages in Ireland
