= Illanmaster =

Island in County Mayo, Ireland

Native name: Oileán Máistir
- Location within island of Ireland

Geography
- Location: Atlantic Ocean
- Coordinates: 54°20′N 9°38′W

Administration
- Ireland
- Province: Connacht
- County: Mayo

Demographics
- Population: 0

Illanmaster or Illaunmaistir (Irish: Oileán Máistir) is an uninhabited steep rocky island rising to about 100m, lying just off the north coast of County Mayo, Ireland and 19 km (12 mi) west of Ballycastle. Grid ref: F 933 435. The island is separated from the mainland by a narrow sound.

== Wildlife ==
It has breeding puffins and storm petrels, and in winter is used by a small flock of barnacle geese. The island is managed as a nature reserve by BirdWatch Ireland. The reserve is inaccessible but can be viewed from the mainland.
