= Matt Devlin (Irish republican) =

IRA member (1950–2005)

- Born: Matthew Devlin; 30 April 1950; Ardboe, County Tyrone, Northern Ireland
- Died: 28 December 2005 (aged 55); Belfast, Northern Ireland
- Known for: 1981 Hunger Strike
- Political party: Sinn Féin
- Military career
- Paramilitary: Provisional IRA
- Rank: Volunteer
- Conflict: The Troubles

Matt Devlin (30 April 1950 — 28 December 2005) was a Provisional Irish Republican Army volunteer who took part in the 1981 Irish hunger strike and was later a leading member of Sinn Féin in County Westmeath, Republic of Ireland.

== Background ==
Matt Devlin was born in Ardboe, County Tyrone, Northern Ireland, on 30 April 1950. He was arrested in 1977, and was taken to Cookstown and Omagh Royal Ulster Constabulary (RUC) barracks and interrogated for four days. He was sentenced to seven years for the attempted murder of members of the RUC officers.

Devlin became the 15th republican prisoner to join the hunger strike in HMP Maze, when he replaced Martin Hurson who died after 46 days on hunger strike on 13 July 1981. He had been involved in the prison protests from the blanket protest right through until the hunger strikes ended, when families began to take their sons off the protest.

== Electoral politics ==
For several years, Devlin lived near Tang, a village in the west of County Westmeath. In 2004, despite serious illness, he stood in local elections in the Republic of Ireland and, although failing to get elected, is credited for building up the Sinn Féin party in County Westmeath.

He died on 28 December 2005 at the age of 55, in hospital in Belfast.

Sinn Féin deputy leader Martin McGuinness said: "It was a testament to Matt’s determination and courage that even when seriously ill he still put himself forward to stand for Sinn Féin in the last Southern elections. Matt continued to play a key role organising and building the party in Westmeath right up until his untimely death a few days ago."

He was buried on 31 December 2005 in his hometown of Ardboe. A monument and tombstone to commemorate him were unveiled on 1 April 2007. The ceremony was attended by thousands.
