= Inishbeg =

Irish-language placename

Inishbeg or Inish beg (Gaeilge: Inis Beag, 'small island') is a name given to several mostly uninhabited islands in Ireland.

== List of islands named Inishbeg ==
- Inishbeg, County Donegal
- Inishbeg, County Cork
- Inishbeg, County Sligo
- Inis Beag, a pseudonymous island near the Aran Islands described by US cultural anthropologist John Cowan Messenger in several academic texts

== Inishbeg, County Cork ==
Inisheg is a former island now connected to the mainland by a bridge joining the R595 road. It is part of Carbery's Hundred Isles

=== Demographics ===
Historical population

Year	Pop.	±%
1841	335	—
1851	88	−73.7%
1861	57	−35.2%
1871	44	−22.8%
1881	57	+29.5%
1891	50	−12.3%
1901	17	−66.0%
1911	14	−17.6%
1926	16	+14.3%

Year	Pop.	±%
1936	5	−68.8%
1946	20	+300.0%
1951	24	+20.0%
1956	16	−33.3%
1961	17	+6.2%
1966	21	+23.5%
1971	10	−52.4%
1979	24	+140.0%
1981	18	−25.0%

Year	Pop.	±%
1986	19	+5.6%
1991	17	−10.5%
1996	19	+11.8%
2002	13	−31.6%
2006	8	−38.5%
2011	25	+212.5%
2016	34	+36.0%
2022	23	−32.4%

Source: Central Statistics Office. "CNA17: Population by Off Shore Island, Sex and Year". CSO.ie.
