= Ballymahon =

Town in County Longford, Ireland

Ballymahon Baile Uí Mhatháin
- Town
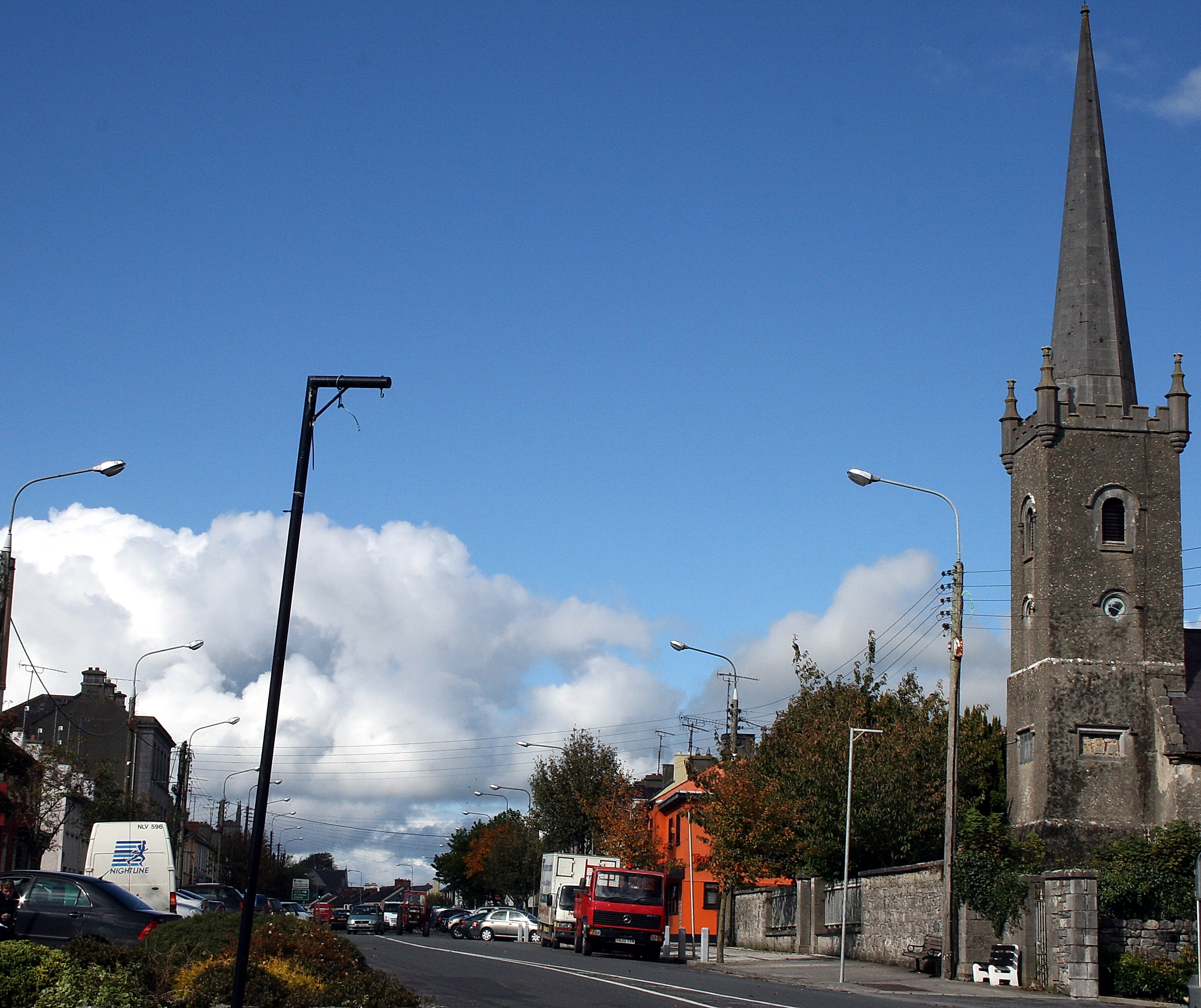
- Ballymahon

- Location in Ireland
- Coordinates: 53°34′00″N 7°46′00″W
- Country: Ireland
- Province: Leinster
- County: County Longford
- Elevation: 82 m (269 ft)

Population (2022)
  - Total: 1,714
- Time zone: UTC+00:00 (WET)
  - Summer (DST): UTC+01:00 (IST)
- Eircode routing key: N39
- Telephone area code: +353(0)90
- Website: ballymahontown.com

Ballymahon (Irish: Baile Uí Mhatháin, meaning 'Mahon's town') on the River Inny is a town in the southern part of County Longford, Ireland. It is 19 km north-east of Athlone, at the junction of the N55 and R392 roads.

== History ==
Ballymahon derives its name from the Irish language term Baile Uí Mhatháin or Baile Mathúna, meaning "Town of Mahon". This may refer to Mahon (Mathgamain mac Cennétig), a southern chieftain and the elder brother of Brian Boru, who is believed by some to have fought a battle in 960 in the vicinity of Ballymahon at Shrule (in Irish Sruaith Fhuil, River of Blood) where he defeated O'Rourke of Cavan and laid claim to lands in the area. This is disputed by others who suggest that it more likely refers to Mathghamhain Ua Fearghail (Mahon O'Ferrall), taoiseach of Anghaile, who died in 1353.

The earliest documentary evidence of Ballymahon is from the year 1578, when lands in the area were granted to the Dillon family, later Earls of Roscommon. By 1654, the maps of William Petty's Down Survey shows Ballymahon as a group of houses situated at the southern end of the present town, on the right bank of the River Inny.

Two main families, the Shuldham family of Moigh House and the King-Harman family of Newcastle House, developed the town in the mid-nineteenth century. The buildings in the town are of late Georgian architecture, with two and three-storey gabled houses, colour-washed and in rows of three and four. From 1788 to 1853, the Roman Catholic bishops of Ardagh and Clonmacnoise resided in the town, and the parish church served as a Pro-Cathedral until St Mel's Cathedral was built in Longford.

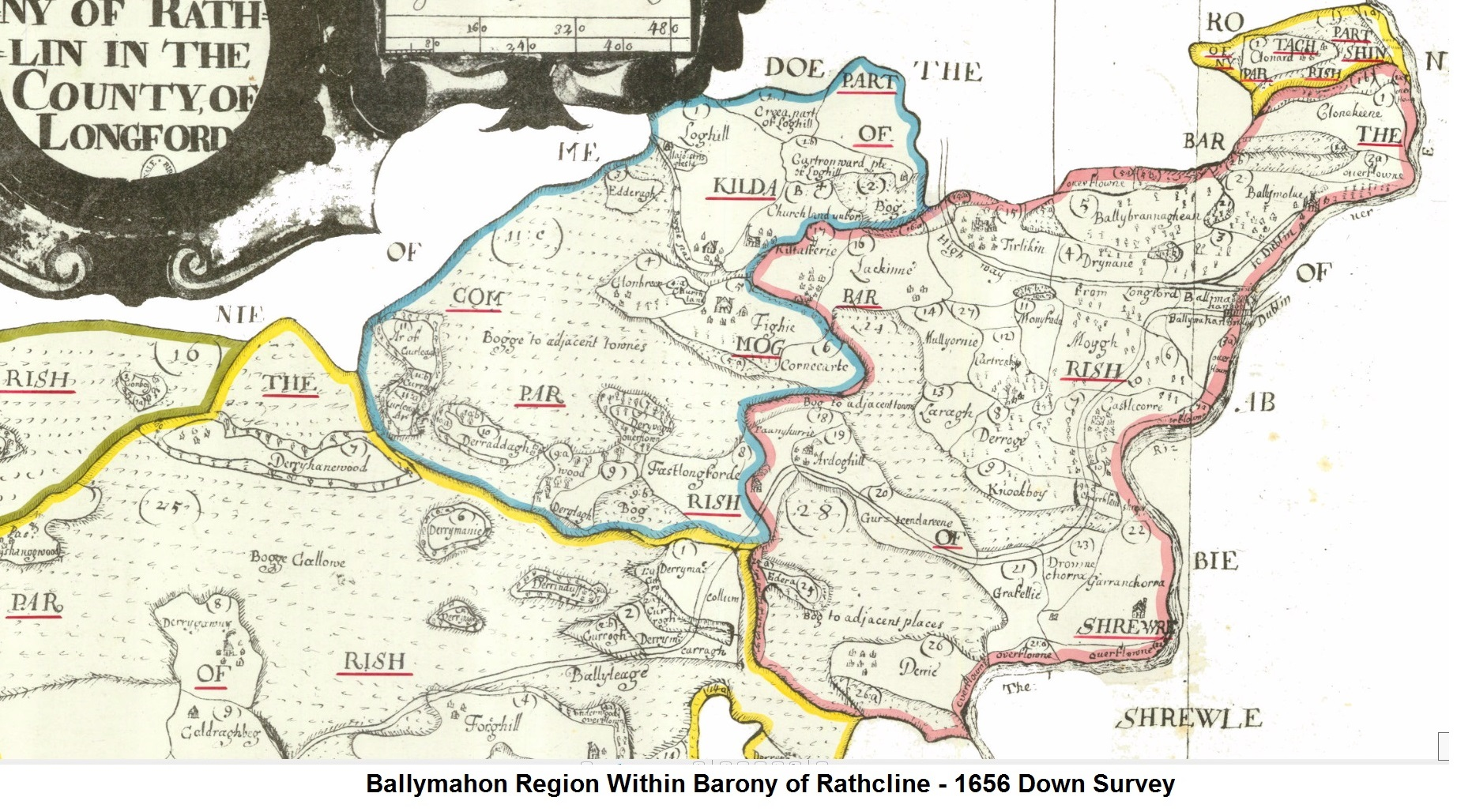
Ballymahon Region within Barony of Rathcline - Down Survey 1659

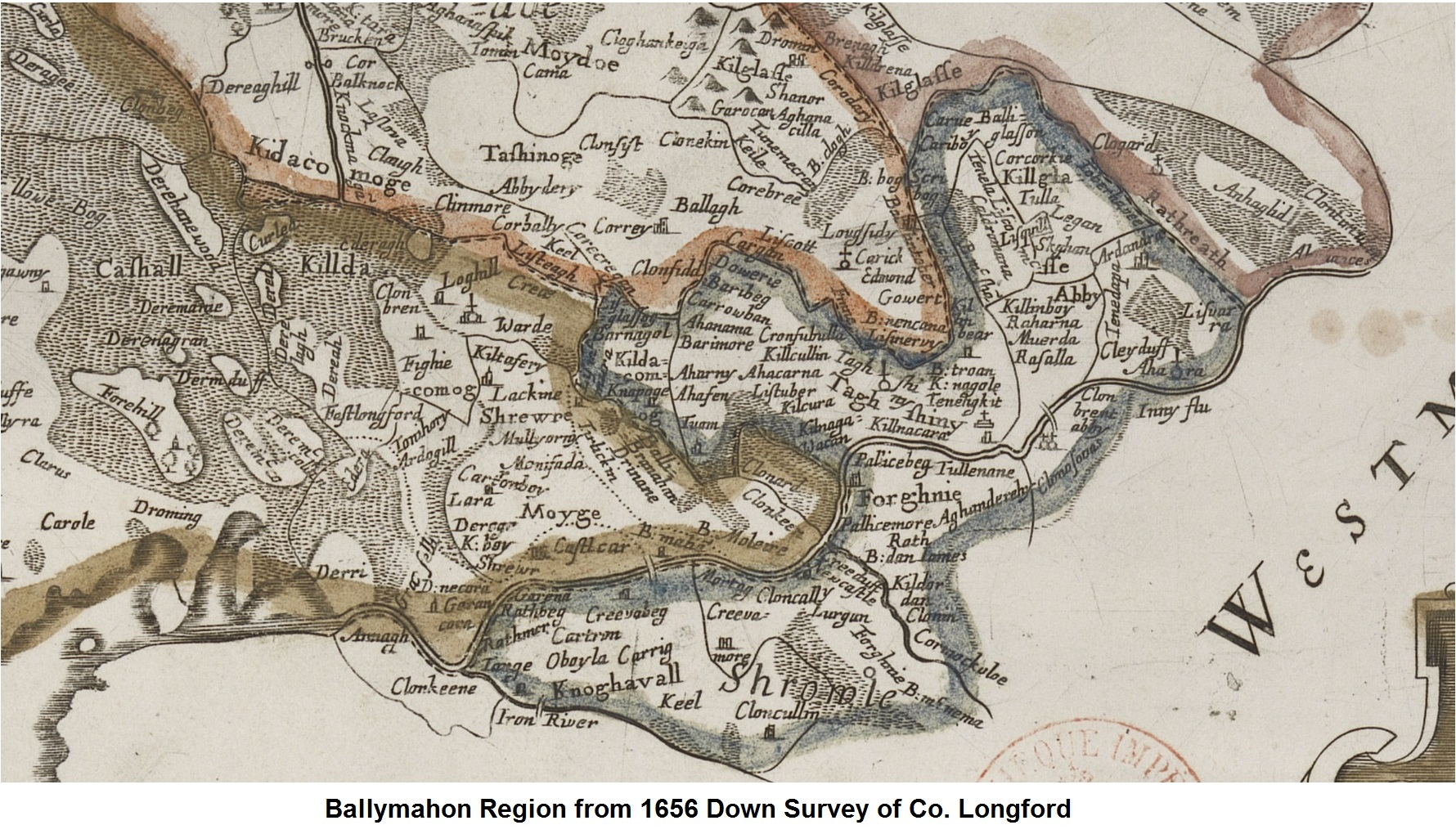
Ballymahon Region Within County Longford - Down Survey 1656

== Geography ==
The River Inny, a tributary of the River Shannon, flows westwards through Ballymahon in the direction of Lough Ree three miles from the town. A stretch of the Inny from Newcastle Bridge to Ballymahon town is used for beginner to intermediate kayaking, canoeing and time trials.

The Royal Canal also passes westwards through Ballymahon from Dublin to Clondra, County Longford. Following extensive works the canal has been restored and is now fully navigable. Brannigan Harbour, c.1 km from Ballymahon town, is on the Royal Canal and is a common point for boats and barges to stop and pass.

== Built heritage ==
Churches in the town include St Matthew's Roman Catholic church (built 1906) which is constructed in a Gothic-style and located on the northwest side of Ballymahon. St Catherine's Church of Ireland church (built 1800, rebuilt 1824) has a narrow spire which is a prominent feature in the town.

Ballymahon Courthouse and Market House, originally built in the early 19th century, is a community library. It is situated in the centre of the town (built 1819).

Opposite St Catherine's Church is the old RIC police barracks built on the northern edge of what local tradition holds was a castle or fortress of the O'Farrell Clan, earthworks of which can still be seen off the Fairgreen/Thomand Lodge Road. It became a Garda station after the establishment of the Irish Free State and remained in service until 1996 when a new, smaller, station was built on the southern bank of the river opposite the old mill. The barracks was attacked during the War of Independence in August 1920. The attack was led by General Seán MacEoin, Seán Connolly (who fired the first shot in the Easter Rising and was later killed himself in the Selton Hill ambush) and Frank Davis. A small party of local volunteers also took part in the raid which mainly aimed to seize firearms. MacEoin later visited the barracks to campaign during an election campaign in the 1950s. Ruairí Ó Brádaigh was held here in the 1950s during the IRA Border War which ended in 1962.

== Transport and communications ==
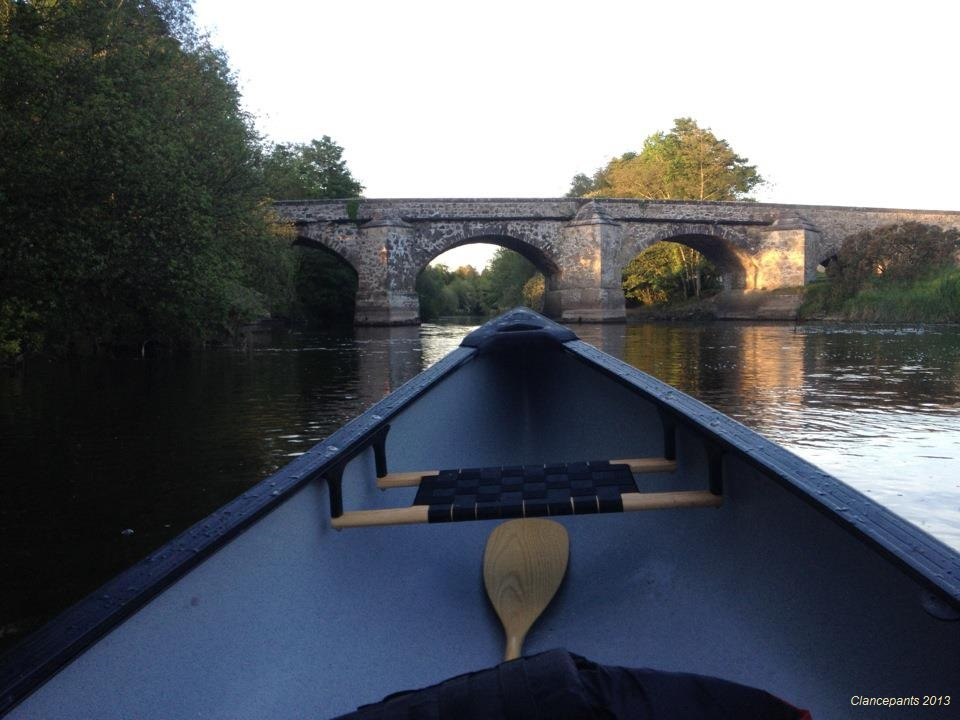
River Inny at Newcastle Bridge

Ballymahon is on the N55 road, a National Secondary route leading from Athlone, 22 kilometres by road to the south, towards Belfast and Northern Ireland. The county town of Longford lies 22 kilometres by road to the north.

The R392 road links Ballymahon to Mullingar in the east and to Roscommon in the west, via Lanesborough–Ballyleague. This route was a portion of an ancient ceremonial way from Rathcroghan to the Hill of Tara. Intact portions of the ancient roadway can be seen at the nearby Corlea Trackway and the ceremonial route attests to the straightness of the R392.

The Royal Canal links Ballymahon to Dublin, via several towns such as Mullingar and Maynooth, and to the River Shannon at Clondra.

Bus services include Bus Éireann route 466 which links Ballymahon with Athlone railway station in County Westmeath, and Local Link route 24 to Longford town and Longford railway station.

== Education ==
Ballymahon has a primary school, St. Matthew's National School, which had an enrollment of over 360 pupils as of 2019. There are also two secondary schools in the area: Mercy Secondary School and Ballymahon Vocational School. The nearest third-level college is Athlone Institute of Technology in Athlone, approximately 22 km away.

== Culture and sport ==
Ballymahon is home to the Bog Lane Theatre. It also hosts the Oliver Goldsmith Summer School, a festival of literature which is held on the June Bank Holiday Weekend, with poetry readings held at Goldsmith's birthplace in Pallas. Ballymahon also plays host to the annual Still Voices International Film Festival.

The town's Gaelic football (GAA) club is Ballymahon GAA, and its association football (soccer) club is Ballymahon AFC.

== Twin towns ==
Ballymahon is twinned with the two adjacent towns of Landévant and Landaul in the Morbihan region of Brittany in north-west France. Twinning events and cross-cultural tours are held annually.

== People ==
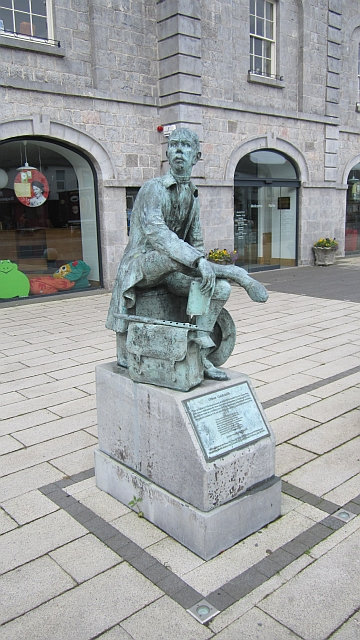
Statue of Oliver Goldsmith outside the refurbished Ballymahon library (former market house)

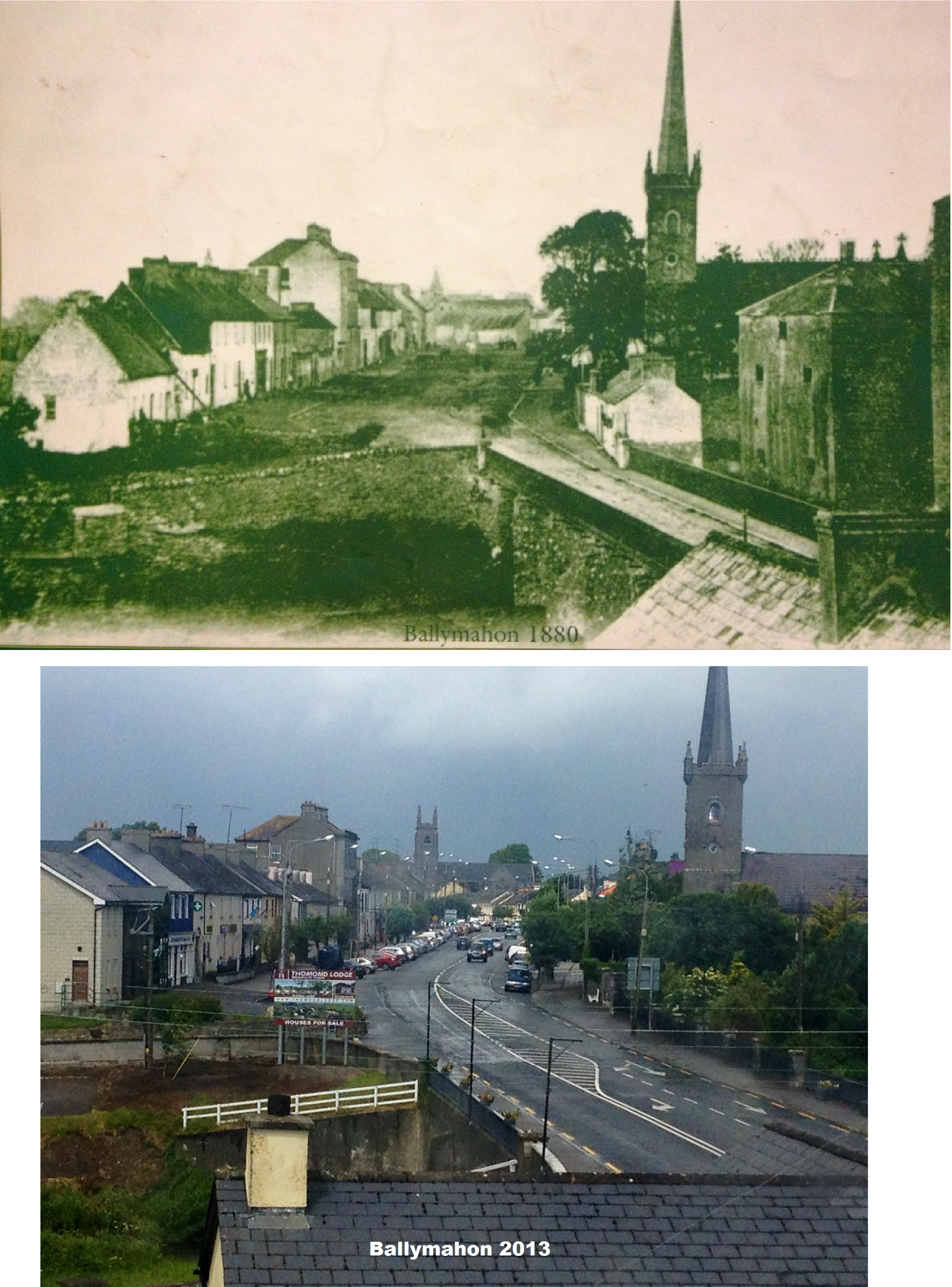
Ballymahon 1880 and 2013

- Sir Thomas Molyneux (1661–1733) and William Molyneux (1656–1698), natural philosopher and writer, were descendants of the Dowdall-Molyneux family who had large estates in Ballymulvey, near Ballymahon.
- Thomas Marlay (c.1680–1756), Lord Chief Justice of Ireland, was born at Creevagh Beg, Ballymahon.
- Oliver Goldsmith (1728–1774), author, was born in the nearby townland of Pallas and raised in nearby Lissoy (The Pigeons). His mother was resident in the town in her latter years in a building later demolished during the widening of the N55 junction in the 1990s. Ballymahon has a monument on the main street commemorating the poet as well as a commemorative monument and park at his birthplace in Pallas.
- Patrick Egan (1841-1919), Irish and American political leader
- John Keegan Casey (1846–1870), known as "the poet of the Fenians" was born in 1846 in County Westmeath before his family moved to Gurteen outside Ballymahon where his father was schoolmaster. Casey later taught in the area and became involved in the Fenian movement locally.
- John Henry Patterson (1867–1947), soldier and author, was born in Forgney near Ballymahon. His book The Man-Eaters of Tsavo (1907) details his experiences while building a railway bridge in Kenya in the late 1890s.
- Dr Kathleen Lynn, political and women's rights activist and medical doctor, lived in Ballymahon for four years in her youth from 1882 to 1886, while her father served as a Church of Ireland clergyman to the Ballymahon Parish.
- James Dooley (1877–1950), Australian politician and Premier of New South Wales, was born at Currycreaghan near Ballymahon.
- Joseph Hoare (1842–1927), the Roman Catholic Bishop of Ardagh and Clonmacnoise from 1895 to 1927
- Maura Higgins (b.1990), reality television personality and contestant on the fifth series of Love Island.

== See also ==
- List of towns and villages in Ireland
- Market Houses in Ireland
