= Lough Sheelin =

Lake in Counties Westmeath, Meath and Cavan, Ireland

- Loch Síodh Linn (Irish)
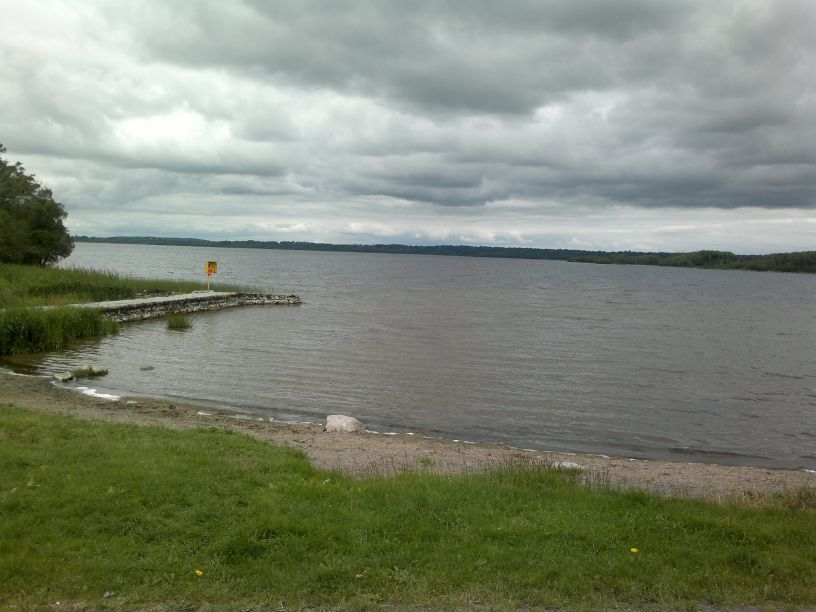

- Location of Lough Sheelin in Ireland
- Location: Counties Westmeath, Meath & Cavan
- Coordinates: 53°48′N 7°19′W
- Lake type: Freshwater lough
- Primary inflows: River Inny
- Primary outflows: River Inny
- Catchment area: River Shannon
- Basin countries: Ireland
- Max. length: 8 km (5.0 mi)
- Max. width: 4 km (2.5 mi)
- Surface area: 19 km^{2} (7.3 sq mi)
- Average depth: 4.4 m (14 ft)
- Max. depth: 15 m (49 ft)
- Islands: 10

Lough Sheelin (from Irish Loch Síodh Linn 'lake of the fairy pool'), in standard Irish Loch Síleann, is a limestone freshwater lough (lake) in central Ireland. The lake is a part of the River Inny course, and ultimately of the Shannon system.

== Geography and geology ==
Lough Sheelin lies at a meeting point of Counties Westmeath, Meath and Cavan, near the villages of Finnea (often spelled Finea) and Mountnugent, and the town of Granard, in a fourth county, (Longford). More than half its area is in County Cavan, and it takes in parts of multiple civil parishes and baronies.

The lake lies on the early course of the River Inny, a major tributary of the Shannon, a little upstream of Lough Kinale. The inflow is sometimes known as the Upper Inny or the Ross River, and the outflow as the Lower Inny. It is also fed by smaller watercourses, including the Mountnugent (Mount Nugent) River and the Bellsgrove (or Belsgrove, also known as Ballyheelan) and Crover Streams, as well as the Mauraghboy, Carrick, Rusheen, Moneybeg and Schoolhouse Streams.

The lake is 7 km (4.3 mi) long, and has a surface area of between 1,855 and 1,900 hectares (4,580 and 4,700 acres). It is underlain by limestone, as is the Upper Inny, while some tributaries are underlain by quartzite.

== Fauna and flora ==
The lake is naturally populated by brown trout whose native stocks became depleted in the latter half of the 20th century; at peak, there were 100,000 to 120,000 brown trout in the lake. Nutrient loading, notably of phosphorus, originating from intensive agricultural developments upstream caused a progressive enrichment of the Lough's waters which led to a substantial decrease in the number of trout from the 1970s to the early 2000s. Zebra mussels, an invasive species, were first seen in the lake in 2000 and there followed a huge increase in their population.

A state agency, Inland Fisheries Ireland, monitors the water quality, including the level of phosphorus, and in conjunction with local organisations, primarily the Lough Sheelin Trout Preservation Association, it and a predecessor body, the Inland Fisheries Trust, has stocked the lake with farm-reared trout. There is also an abundance of common roach in the lake, and other species present include 3- and 9-spined stickleback, pike, perch, and eels.

== Status ==
The lake is a Special Protection Area (SPA) under the EU Birds Directive (EC/79/409), as an important site for wintering waterfowl, supporting nationally important populations of great crested grebe, pochard, tufted duck and goldeneye.

== Popular culture ==
Lough Sheelin is the setting of the song "Lough Sheelin Eviction", made popular by the Wolfe Tones. The song is purportedly based on an account of an eviction of more than 700 tenants, witnessed by Dr. Thomas Nulty, Roman Catholic Bishop of Meath, in 1848, in his first year as a priest in the diocese.

== See also ==
- List of loughs in Ireland
