= River Inny (Leinster) =

Tributary of the Shannon in central Ireland

Coordinates: 51°51′N 10°11′W

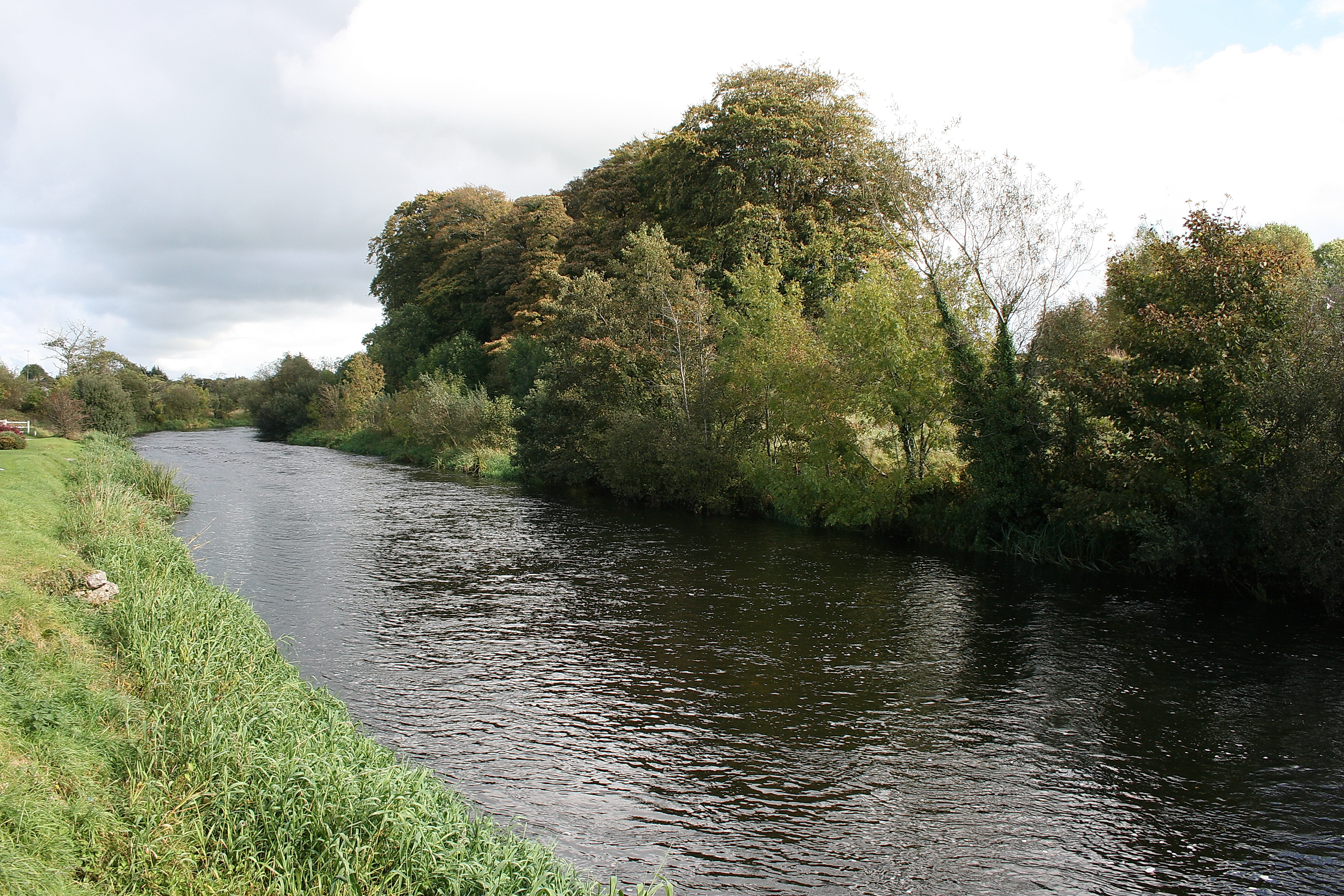
- River Inny, Ballymahon
- Etymology: From the mythological figure Ethniu
- Native name: An Eithne (Irish)

Location
- Country: Ireland

Physical characteristics
- Source
  - location: Near Oldcastle and Loughcrew, County Meath
- Mouth
  - location: Lough Ree (River Shannon)
- Length: 88.5 km (55.0 mi)
- Basin size: 1,254 km^{2} (484 sq mi)
- Discharge
  - average: 18.4 m^{3}/s (650 cu ft/s)

Basin features
- River system: River Shannon

The River Inny (Irish: An Eithne) is a river within the Shannon River Basin in Ireland. It is 88.5 kilometres (55.0 mi) in length, and has a number of lakes along its course.

== Etymology ==
The river's name derives from the mythological figure Ethniu or Eithne, who reputedly died in rapids in its lower reaches.

== Course ==
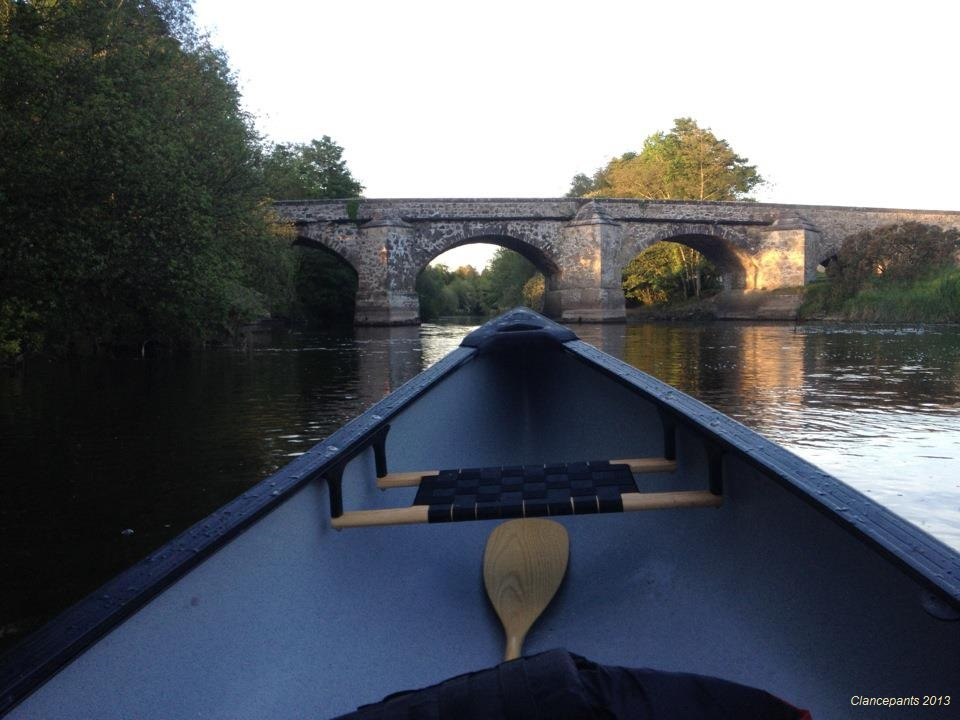
Inny River at Newcastle Bridge

The Inny begins as a stream at Slieve na Calliagh, in the townland of Tubride, near Oldcastle, a hilly area which holds the complex of megalithic tombs now more often named for Loughcrew, all in County Meath. In its upper reaches, it marks the boundary between Counties Meath and Cavan for about a short distance before it enters Lough Sheelin, which lies at a meeting points of Counties Cavan, Meath and Westmeath. The portion as far as Lough Sheelin is also sometimes known as the Upper Inny, or the Ross River.

At Lough Sheelin, multiple tributaries join, including the Mountnugent (Mount Nugent) River and the Bellsgrove (or Belsgrove, also known as Ballyheelan) and Crover Streams, as well as the Mauraghboy, Carrick, Rusheen, Moneybeg and Schoolhouse Streams. The Upper Inny and Lough Sheelin are on limestone, while some of the Lough Sheelin tributaries flow over quartzite.

From Lough Sheelin, the Inny, sometimes known as the Lower Inny from here on, forms the boundary between Westmeath and Cavan. It flows under the bridge at the village of Finea, and into Lough Kinale, where counties Cavan and Westmeath meet Longford. From there the river forms much of the boundary between Longford and Westmeath but enters Westmeath near Streete and flows into Lough Derravaragh, known for its role in the legend of the Children of Lir. It then flows near the village of Ballinalack, forms Lough Iron, and crosses into County Longford near Abbeyshrule, where the Whitworth Aqueduct suspends the Royal Canal above the river, and pumps supply the canal with water. At nearby Tenelick the mythological Princess Eithne drowned in the rapids, giving her name to the river, which powered two mills here for many years. It continues past Newcastle House to Ballymahon.

Downstream of Ballymahon, the Inny again forms the county line between Longford and Westmeath, and runs westwards into Lough Ree at Inny Bay. Lough Ree is the second major lake of the River Shannon which drains into the Atlantic Ocean.

In the 1960s the river was drained which removed the weir at Newcastle, this fed a generator and a sawmill for the "big house" nearby. It also closed off the millrace and millpond to the ruined mill at the bridge in Ballymahon. This silenced the waterfall at the mill which had roared for about 100 years.
