= Kippinstown =

Townland in County Westmeath, Ireland

Kippinstown (Irish: Baile na gCipín) is a townland in Athlone, County Westmeath, Ireland. The townland is in the civil parish of St. Mary's.

The townland stands to the north of the city, on the shores of Balaghkeeran Lough, which in turn flows into Killinure Lough. The townland is bordered by Ballykeeran to the east, Cappankelly and Garrynafela to the west and Clonagh to the south.
