= Meehan, County Westmeath =

Townland in County Westmeath, Ireland

Meehan is a townland in Athlone, County Westmeath, Ireland. The townland is in the civil parish of St. Mary's.

The townland stands to the north of the town, on the banks of the River Shannon, at the point that it meets Lough Ree. The townland is bordered by Coosan and Creaghduff to the east, and Hillquarter to the south.
