= Shannon-One-Design =

The Shannon One Design sailing dinghy is an open centreboard sailing boat raced on the River Shannon, Lough Derg and Lough Ree in Ireland. The boats are 18 feet (5.5 m) long by 4 feet 10.5 inches (1.486 m) beam, drawing 4 feet (1.2 m) with her centreboard down. They have a sail area of 140 square feet (15.6m2) set in a single sail, giving the boat what is called a gunter rig.

== History ==
During the 19th and early 20th century racing was organised for 18'-0" long open centre board boats with one sail on the Shannon lakes. These boats were effectively a restricted class, restricted by length, beam and sail area. different lakeside and riverside builders adapted their traditional rowing boats to meet an owners preferences.

The creation of the Shannon One Design sailing dinghy came about after a meeting of representatives of Lough Ree Yacht Club, Lough Derg Yacht Club and North Shannon Yacht Club (Lough Boderg) held in the Prince of Wales Hotel, Athlone, on 29 January 1920. The committee commissioned a leading British designer of the time, F.C. Morgan-Giles. Later that year Morgan-Giles delivered the plans. The first boat was ordered from Walter Levinge of Creaghduff, Coosan, Athlone, Co.Westmeath and delivered in 1921. This boat was built with a more powerful Gunter rig, and not the balanced lug as designed. The centre board as installed was of almost half the weight originally intended by F.C.M.G. (Ref) talk by Vincent Delany at LRYC February 2020 (/ref) All of this results in a dynamic dinghy.

== Builders ==
Walter Levinge: Creaghduff - 32 - 38 and all boats up to 117 not listed below.

Merne: No.39.

Charlie Ward: No.42.

Patrick Keneavy: No. 50.

Eddie Gray: Dún Laoghaire - No. 70.

Tommy Gallagher: No.71.

Lomax: No. 79, 81, 87, 89, 90, 94.

Quigley: No. 99, 104, 105, 115, 116, 119, 120, 123 - 127, 138, 141, 143, 152.

Jimmy Furey: No. 107, 112, 113, 121, 128 - 131, 139, 140, 144 - 150, 153 - 156.

Erik Goodbody: No. 142, 151

== Sailing ==
The "SOD" or "Shannon" as the class is often called requires three people to race and this produces a very sociable form of sailing. Sailing SODs has always attracted families, and generations in many cases have been involved in campaigning the same boat down through the years. Indeed, many of the same family names that attended that first meeting in 1920 still feature in SOD racing today. The SOD is an exciting boat to sail in a breeze of wind, and a serious challenge to sail well in any conditions. As a result, SOD sailing attracts a wide range of sailors from far and wide, not simply limited to Shannon riverside dwellers. At the two main events each year, the week long regattas at Ballyglass on Lough Ree and Dromineer on Lough Derg, up to 55 SODs have been counted. These will be sailed by a mixture of local sailors and others based in Dublin or elsewhere (as far away as the United States), most of whom return year on year to compete. It is not unusual to have two generations of the same family sailing together in a SOD or even have all three crew-members from the same family. There is also a very healthy influx of younger sailors joining the fleet to compete against older generations.

== The Shannon One Design Association ==
The Shannon One Design Association (‘SODA’) is the governing body responsible for promotion of the class and enforcement of the class rules. In 1989 they sanctioned changes to the original hull and rig plans to take into account new technologies.

== Background to yacht racing on the Shannon ==
Sailing has flourished on the River Shannon, and especially on Loughs Allen, Key, Ree and Derg, for hundreds of years. Initially a means of transport, it gradually became a social event. In the eighteenth century, travel by water was the safest and most convenient way. Therefore, if you were one of those who could say that "one lived in a fine house on the shores of a lake or (Cork) harbour", it was likely that "one" kept a yacht and a boatman as a means of going on house visits, going hunting, or accessing the railway.

This very quickly evolved into rendezvous for picnics, joint manoeuvres and ultimately competition. Two of these clubs still surviving are the Lough Ree Yacht Club (Ballyglass, Athlone), which traces its origins to Athlone Yacht Club est. 1770, making it the second oldest yacht club in the world, and the Lough Derg Yacht Club (est. 1835) (at Dromineer).

Sailing craft have until recently been just that: crafted by hand and eye. Each builder learned — and incorporated improvements in each successive boat. Yacht designers did the same, and the sport of yacht racing therefore evolved into a handicap sport as the boats were all different. One Design classes were created in the first quarter of the 20th century to provide evenly matched racing without handicaps.

== In the media ==
In 2010 the second episode BBC television series Three Men Go to Ireland featured the three men, Dara Ó Briain, Griff Rhys Jones and Rory McGrath, racing SODs adjacent to the Lough Derg Yacht Club the previous October.
