= 1921 in Ireland =

- Centuries: 18th; 19th; 20th; 21st
- Decades: 1900s; 1910s; 1920s; 1930s; 1940s
- See also: 1921 in the United Kingdom; 1921 in Northern Ireland; Other events of 1921; List of years in Ireland

Events from the year 1921 in Ireland.

== Incumbents ==
- President of Dáil Éireann: Éamon de Valera
- Minister for Finance: Michael Collins
- Dáil:
  - 1st (until 16 August 1921)
  - 2nd (from 16 August 1921)

== Events ==
- 31 January – Irish War of Independence: Mallow shootings in County Cork – Following the death of a Royal Irish Constabulary officer's wife in an Irish Republican Army ambush at a railway bridge, men of the RIC rounded up and shot at staff from Mallow railway station, killing three.
- 1 February
  - Captain Con Murphy from near Millstreet, County Cork was executed by British authorities, the first man to be executed in front of a firing squad since the 1916 Easter Rising.
  - The Irish White Cross was established to distribute funds raised by the American Committee for Relief in Ireland.
- 4 February – Irish War of Independence: The Irish Republican Army set fire to Summerhill House in County Meath, destroying it.
- 5 February – Katherine Parnell, the widow of Charles Stewart Parnell, died aged 76 in Brighton, England.
- 5 March – Irish War of Independence: Clonbanin Ambush: The Irish Republican Army killed Brigadier General Hanway Robert Cumming.
- 16–17 March – Irish War of Independence: The Irish Republican Army killed two Royal Irish Constabulary constables in Clifden. The Black and Tans were called in and killed one civilian, seriously injured another, burned 14 houses and damaged several others.
- 19 March – Irish War of Independence: Crossbarry Ambush: British troops failed to encircle an outnumbered column of Irish Republican Army volunteers in County Cork, with at least ten British and three IRA deaths.
- 21 March – Irish War of Independence: Headford Ambush: The Irish Republican Army killed at least nine British troops.
- 27 April – Viscount FitzAlan of Derwent was appointed Lord Lieutenant of Ireland, the first Roman Catholic granted the office since 1685.
- 3 May – The state of Northern Ireland was created within the United Kingdom under the terms of the Government of Ireland Act 1920.
- 13 May – Irish elections, under the terms of the Government of Ireland Act 1920: At close of nomination for elections to the new Parliament of Southern Ireland, all 128 candidates were returned unopposed and deemed elected. All 124 Sinn Féin candidates regarded themselves as elected to the Second Dáil.
- 24 May – 1921 Irish elections: In the Northern Ireland general election for the new Parliament of Northern Ireland (held by single transferable vote), it was apparent by 29 May that the Unionists had a substantial majority (40 out of 52 seats).
- 25 May – Irish War of Independence: The Irish Republican Army occupied and burned the Custom House, Dublin, the centre of local government in Ireland. Five IRA men were killed and over eighty captured by the British Army which surrounded the building.
- 7 June – The opening of the Parliament of Northern Ireland. The forty elected Unionist members of parliament gathered in Belfast City Hall. James Craig was elected as the first Prime Minister of Northern Ireland.
- 20 June – Irish War of Independence: British Major-General Lambert died at Athlone of a gunshot wound sustained in an IRA ambush; early on 2 July six farmhouses in the area were burned, apparently in retaliation, and the following day the IRA, in turn, burn down Moydrum Castle.
- 22 June – The new Parliament of Northern Ireland met at Belfast City Hall and was opened by George V of the United Kingdom, making a speech (drafted by Jan Smuts) calling for reconciliation in Ireland.
- 28 June – The new Parliament of Southern Ireland met at the Royal College of Science for Ireland in Merrion Street, Dublin and was opened by the Lord Lieutenant of Ireland, Viscount FitzAlan. In addition to the appointed Senate, only the four Unionist MPs representing Dublin University attended the House of Commons. Having elected Gerald Fitzgibbon to be Speaker, the House adjourned sine die. This was its only formal meeting and it never enacted any legislation.
- 4 July – James Craig refused to attend a peace conference in Dublin because the invitation by President Éamon de Valera was addressed to him personally instead of to the Prime Minister of Northern Ireland.
- 8 July – At the Peace Conference in the Mansion House, Dublin, President de Valera accepted an invitation to meet the prime minister of the United Kingdom, David Lloyd George, in London.
- 10 July – Bloody Sunday: Clashes between Catholics and Protestants in Belfast resulted in 16 deaths (23 over the surrounding four-day period) and the destruction of over 200 (mostly Catholic) homes.
- 11 July – Under the terms of the truce (signed on 9 July) which became effective at noon, the British Army agreed that there would be no provocative display of forces or incoming troops. The Irish Republican Army agreed that attacks on Crown forces would cease.
- 21 July - The Belfast Pogrom began with the one-day removal of thousands of Belfast shipyard, factory and mill workers from their jobs.
- 16 August – Following the uncontested election for the Parliament of Southern Ireland, 125 Sinn Féin TDs assembled as the Second Dáil at the Mansion House in Dublin. Six represented constituencies in Northern Ireland (five of them jointly with constituencies in the South).
- 23 August – The Northern Cabinet agreed that Stormont Castle would be the permanent site of the Northern Houses of Parliament.
- 7 September – Lloyd George summoned a meeting of the Cabinet of the United Kingdom at Inverness in Scotland to discuss an independent Ireland's relationship with the British Empire.
- 8 September – Lloyd George's final offer was delivered to Éamon de Valera. Sinn Féin was invited to discuss the proposals which would grant limited sovereignty within the British Empire.
- 14 September – Dáil Éireann selected five delegates to negotiate agreement with Lloyd George in London, including Michael Collins and Arthur Griffith.
- 8 October – The Irish delegation left for London to discuss the Anglo-Irish Treaty.
- 9 October – Large crowds greeted the Irish delegation at Euston Station in London. Griffith told the crowd that de Valera would not travel to London.
- 11 October – The Irish Treaty Conference opened in London.
- 1 November – Frances Kyle and Averil Deverell were called to the Bar of Ireland, becoming the first female barristers in Britain or Ireland.
- 6 December – Agreement was reached in the Anglo-Irish Treaty negotiations in London. The main points included the creation of an Irish Free State within the Commonwealth, an Oath of Allegiance to the Crown, and retention by the British naval services of the use of certain Irish ports. Following this, Éamon de Valera accused the Irish delegation to London of having ignored its instructions, and Arthur Griffith accused de Valera of knowing at the time that a Republic could not be achieved.
- 16 December – The British House of Commons accepted the Articles of Agreement. The House of Lords also voted to accept the Treaty by a large majority.
- Undated – Bethany Home established in Dublin as a home for Protestant unmarried mothers, reformed prostitutes and those convicted of petty offences.

== Arts and literature ==
- 6 January – George Shiels' play Bedmates premiered at the Abbey Theatre, Dublin.
- 24 February – Terence MacSwiney's play The Revolutionist (set and published in 1914) had its stage premiere posthumously at the Abbey Theatre. His writings Principles of Freedom were collected from Irish Freedom (1911–12) and published this year also.
- Ina Boyle's pastoral for orchestra Colin Clout premiered.
- George Moore published the novel Heloise and Abelard.
- L. A. G. Strong published the poetry Dublin Days (in Oxford).
- W. B. Yeats published the poetry Michael Robartes and the Dancer and Four Plays for Dancers.

== Sport ==
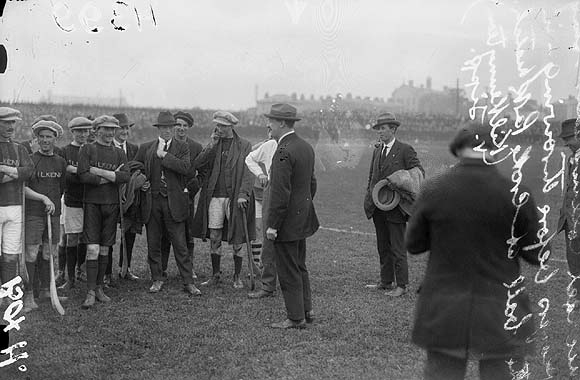
Leinster Senior Hurling Championship

=== Association football ===
- The new Football Association of Ireland was formed in Dublin after a split from the Belfast-based Irish Football Association. Shelbourne FC and Bohemian FC were amongst the eight founder members of the new League of Ireland. (See: FAI – Split from the IFA).

=== Gaelic games ===
- The All-Ireland Champions were Limerick (hurling) and Dublin (football).

== Births ==
- 3 January – Eddie Gannon, association football player (died 1989).
- 24 January
  - Sybil Connolly, fashion designer (died 1998).
  - Patrick Scott, painter (died 2014).
- 17 January – Donogh O'Malley, Fianna Fáil party teachta dála (TD) and cabinet minister (died 1968).
- 22 February – Cecil King, painter (died 1986).
- 8 March – James Comyn, Justice of the High Court of England (died 1997).
- 10 March – Bernard Devlin, Roman Catholic bishop of the Diocese of Gibraltar.
- 21 March – Yaakov Herzog, Dublin-born Israeli diplomat (died 1972).
- 25 March – John Joe McGirl, chief of staff of the Irish Republican Army (died 1988).
- 14 April – Mona Tyndall, missionary sister and development worker (died 2000).
- 31 May – Billy Walsh, association football player and manager (died 2006).
- 29 June – Desmond Leslie, pilot, filmmaker and writer (died 2001).
- 23 July – Malachi Martin, Roman Catholic priest and author (died 1999).
- 27 July – Tom Nolan, Fianna Fáil TD, minister of state and Member of the European Parliament (MEP) (died 1992).
- 7 August – Éamonn Young, Cork Gaelic footballer (died 2007).
- 22 August – Michael Yeats, Fianna Fáil Seanad member and MEP (died 2007).
- 8 September – Patrick Flynn, Liberal Party of Canada member of parliament (died 1996).
- 22 November – Brian Cleeve, writer and television broadcaster (died 2003).
- 17 December – Alice Glenn, Fine Gael party politician (died 2011).
- 24 December – Gerard Victory, composer (died 1995).

== Deaths ==
- 5 January – James Rankin, lighthouse keeper in America (born 1844).
- 21 April – Rosa Mulholland, Lady Gilbert, novelist, short-story writer and poet (born 1841).
- 28 April – Maurice Moore, Irish republican who fought in the Irish War of Independence, executed (born 1894).
- 9 June – Sir Henry Bellingham, 4th Baronet, politician and barrister (born 1846).
- 18 August – Samuel Cleland Davidson, inventor and engineer (born 1846).
- 9 October – Egerton Bushe Coghill, painter (born 1853).
- 10 December – George Ashlin, architect (born 1837).
- Full date unknown – James Gogarty, participant in the Easter Rising and first known Irish Republican Brotherhood casualty of the Irish War of Independence (born 1890).
