= Portlick Motte =

Motte and National Monument in County Westmeath, Ireland

- Móta Phort Lice (Irish)
- Location within Ireland
- 53.491193°N 7.910627°W
- Type: motte
- Periods: c. AD 200
- Location: Portlick, Glassan, County Westmeath, Ireland

Site notes
- Material: earth, stone
- Height: 3 m (9.8 ft)
- Diameter: 14 m (46 ft)

National monument of Ireland
- Official name: Portlick
- Reference no.: 624

Portlick Motte is a motte and National Monument located in County Westmeath, Ireland.

== Location ==
Portlick Motte is located on the eastern shore of Lough Ree, 3.6 km (2.2 mi) west of Tubberclare.
