= Moydrum =

Townland in County Westmeath, Ireland

Coordinates: 53°25′40″N 7°52′25″W

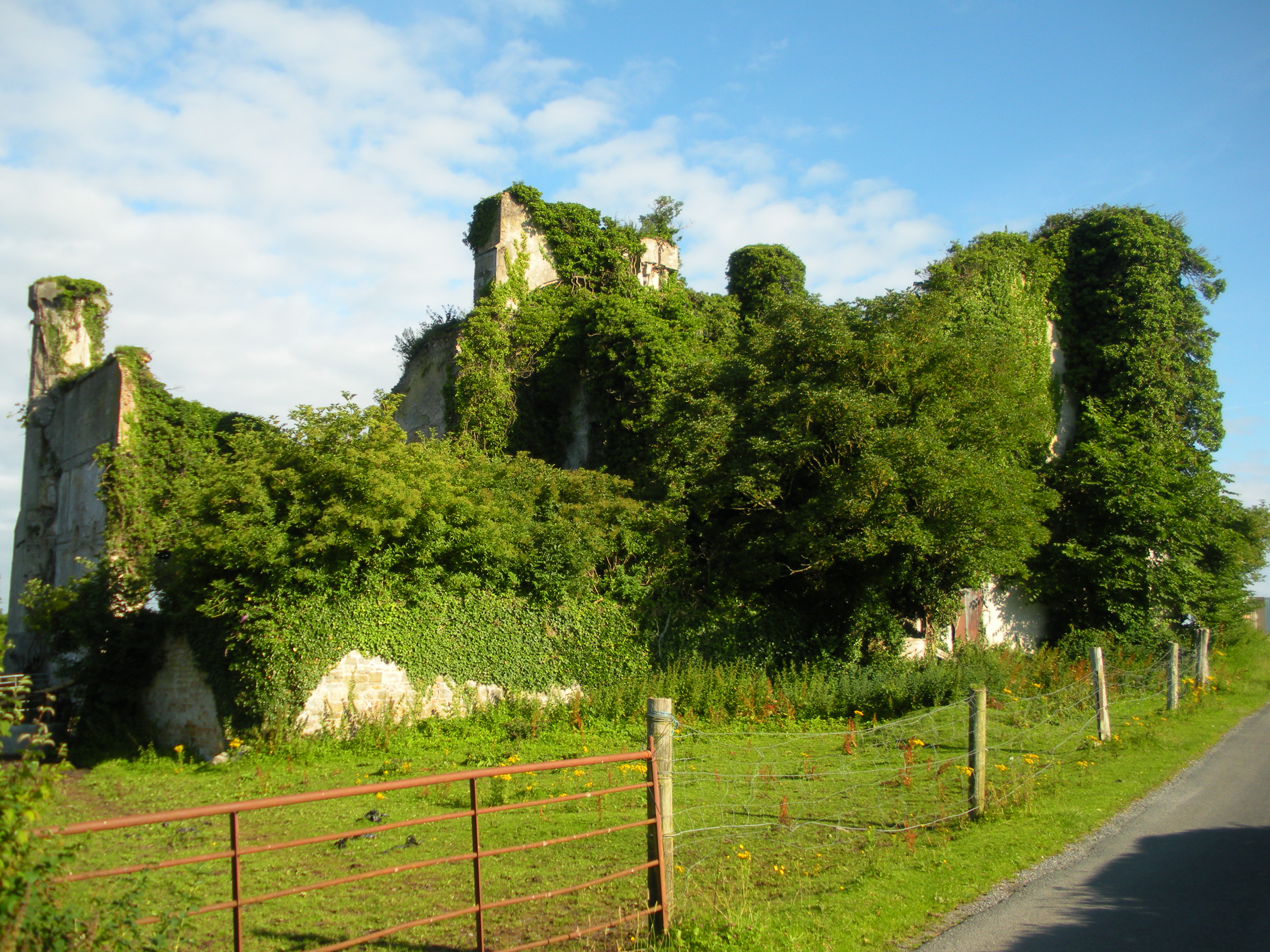
Moydrum Castle lies within Moydrum townland near Athlone

Moydrum is a townland near Athlone, County Westmeath, Ireland. The townland is in the civil parishes of St. Mary's and Ballyloughloe (Clonlonan).

The townland stands to the east of the town. The Athlone to Mullingar Cycleway cuts through the centre of the area. The townland is bordered by Blyry Lower, Blyry Upper, Creggan Lower, and Garrycastle to the west, Annaghgortagh and Tullycross to the north, Crosswood and Creggan Upper to the south and Carn Park to the east.

Moydrum also lends its name to an electoral division which covers the area to the north of Athlone.

== Moydrum Castle ==
Moydrum Castle, a ruined 19th century castle, is in the east of the townland. It was burned down by the IRA during the Irish independence war, as a reprisal after the Black and Tans burned down several farms in the area.
