= Brawny (barony) =

Barony in County Westmeath, Ireland

Brawny Breámhaine
- Barony
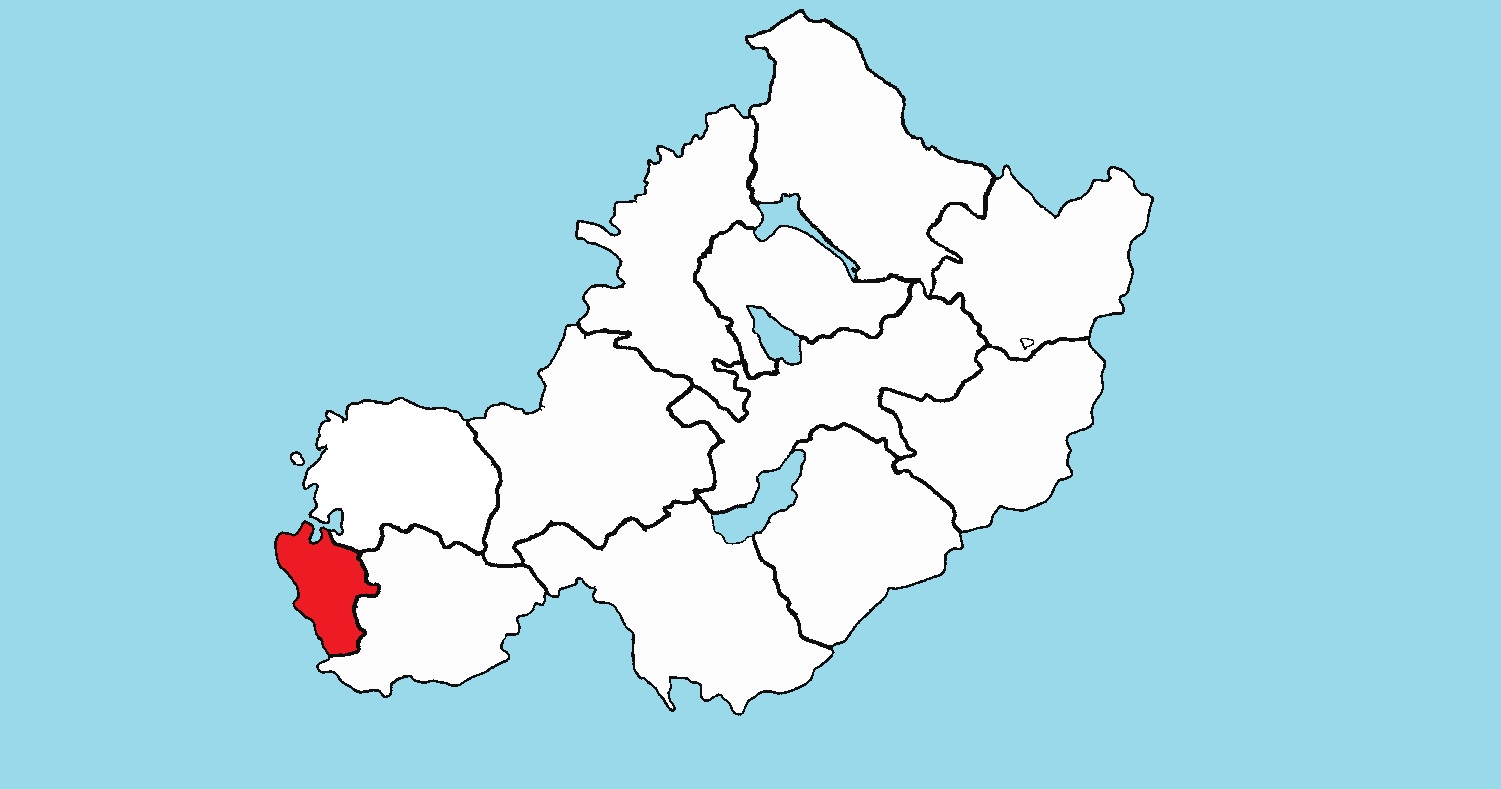
- Location of Brawny on a map of Westmeath

- Location in Ireland
- Coordinates: 53°25′26″N 7°54′29″W
- Country: Ireland
- Province: Leinster
- County: Westmeath

Area
  - Total: 48.8 km^{2} (18.8 sq mi)
- Time zone: UTC+0 (WET)
  - Summer (DST): UTC+1 (IST (WEST))
- Irish Grid Reference: N061415

Brawny (Irish: Breámhaine) is a barony in south–west County Westmeath, Ireland. It was formed by 1672. It is bordered by County Roscommon to the west. It also borders two other Westmeath baronies: Kilkenny West (to the north–east) and Clonlonan (to the south-east). The largest centre of population in the barony is the town of Athlone.

== Geography ==
Brawny has an area of 12,069.4 acres (48.843 km^{2}).

The barony contains a small part of the southern end of the second largest lake on the River Shannon, Lough Ree. It also includes part of the eastern half of the Shannon as far as Long Island to the south. The River Shannon is the longest river in Ireland at 360.5 km (224 miles).

Several significant roads pass through the barony. The M6, a motorway forming part of the N6 Dublin to Galway national primary road, the N55 national secondary road connecting Athlone to Cavan and the N62 connecting the M6 to the M8.

A railway line carrying several of the national rail company Iarnród Éireann's intercity services also passes through the barony.

== Civil parish ==
The barony is unusual in Ireland in having a single civil parish - St Mary's - that comprises the entire barony. It should not be confused with an Ecclesiastical parish of the same name.

== Towns, villages and townlands ==
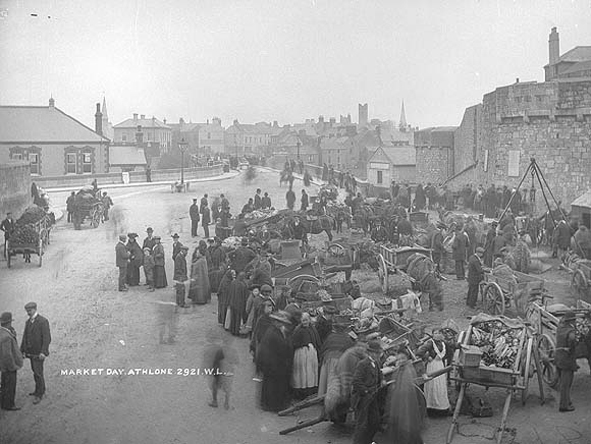
Market Day, Athlone c. 1890

- Athlone, a large town on the River Shannon.
- Ballykeeran, a small village located on the N55 road near Glassan.
- Coosan, a small village and townland on the banks of Lough Ree.

There are 62 townlands in the barony of Brawny.

== Places of interest ==
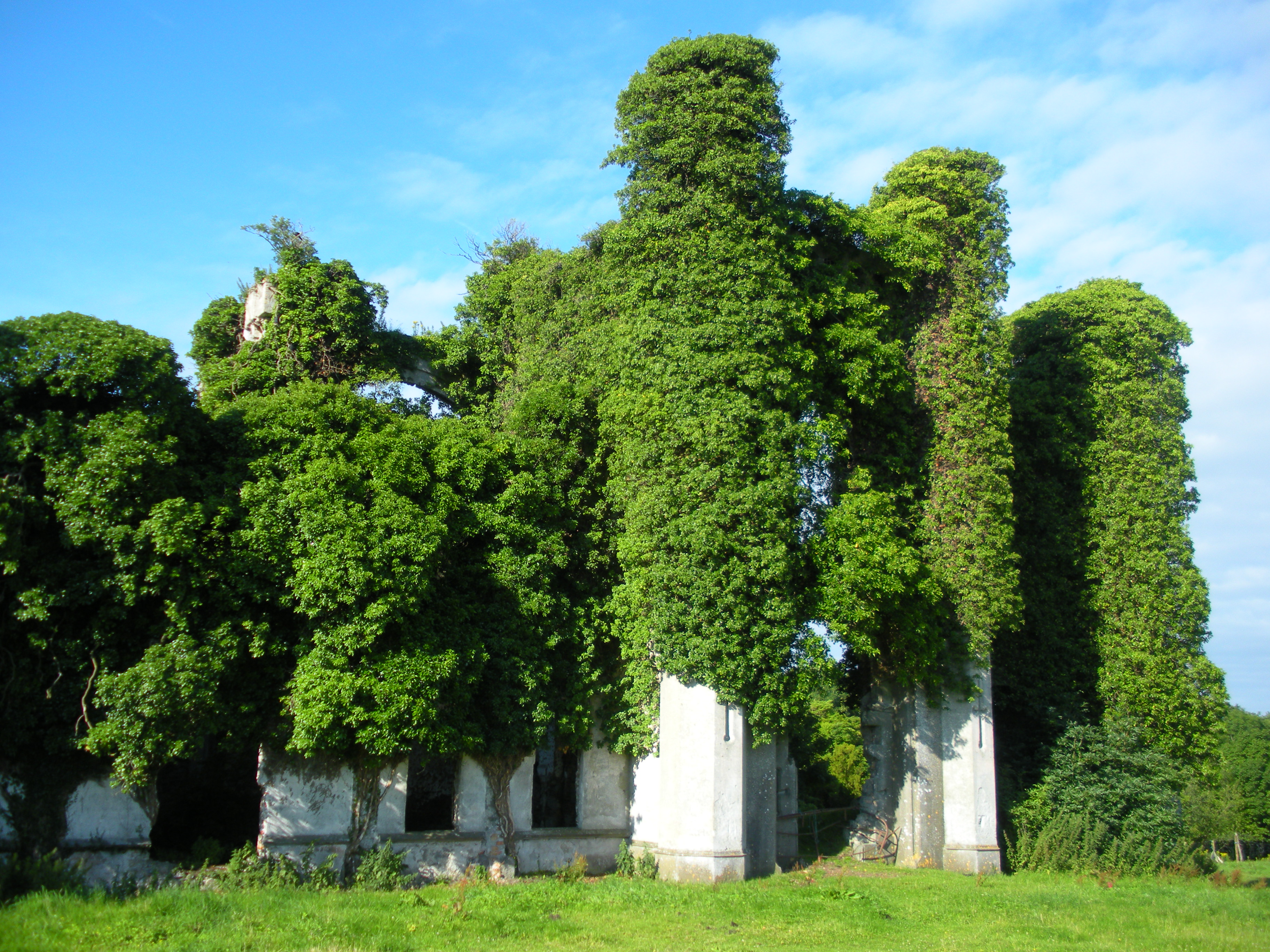
Moydrum Castle

Moydrum Castle is a ruined gothic-revivalist castle in the area. It was completed in 1814 and destroyed by fire in 1921.
