= Kilmacuagh =

Kilmacuagh may refer to:

- Kilmacuagh (Castlemaine), a townland in County Westmeath, Ireland
- Kilmacuagh (Cooke), a townland in County Westmeath, Ireland
- Kilmacuagh (Mechum), a townland in County Westmeath, Ireland
