= Retreat, County Westmeath =

Townland in County Westmeath, Ireland

Retreat (Irish: An Díthreabh) is a townland in Athlone, County Westmeath, Ireland. The townland is in the civil parish of St. Mary's.

The townland stands in the east side of the town. The Athlone to Mullingar Cycleway passes through the townland, and the Athlone Community College stands in the western area.

The townland is bordered by Cloghanboy (Homan) and Curragh to the north and west, Collegeland, Kilnafaddoge and Lissywollen to the east and south,
