= Kilmacuagh (Mechum) =

Killmacuagh (Mechum)
- Townland
- Location in Ireland
- Country: Ireland
- County: Westmeath
- Civil parish: St. Mary's

Killmacuagh (Mechum) is a townland in Athlone, County Westmeath, Ireland. The townland is in the civil parish of St. Mary's.

The townland stands in the southeast area of the town, the Dublin–Westport/Galway railway line passes through the area in the south. The townland is bordered by Kilmacuagh (Castlemaine) and Garrycastle to the east, Bunnavally to the north, Derries to the west and Bunnahinly to the south.
