= Cookanamuck =

Uninhabited island in Ireland

Coordinates: 53.45945°N 7.9174°W

Cookanamuck (Irish: Cnocán na Muc) is a small uninhabited island (isthmus) in County Westmeath, Ireland. It is located near Friars Island in Lough Ree. It is in the civil parish of St. Mary's.

== See also ==
- Creaghduff
