= Ardnaglug =

Townland in County Roscommon, Ireland

Ardnaglug Ard na gClog
- Townland
- Interactive map of Ardnaglug
- Country: Ireland

Ardnaglug (Irish: Ard na gClog) is a townland in Athlone in County Roscommon, Ireland. The townland is in the civil parish of St. Mary's.

The townland lies to the east of Athlone Town Centre. The Athlone to Mullingar Cycleway which is part of the cross country Dublin-Galway Greenway forms the northern border.
