= Loughanaskin =

Townland in County Westmeath, Ireland

Loughanaskin is a townland in Athlone, County Westmeath, Ireland. The townland is in the civil parish of St. Mary's.

The townland stands to the centre of the city, with the Dublin–Westport/Galway railway line passing through the north of the area. St. Mary's Roman Catholic Church and Saint Mary's National School are located in the townland. The townland is bordered by Aghacocara, Ankers Bower, Cannonsfield, and Loughandonning to the east, Athlone and Cloghanboy West to the west, and Curragh (Mechum) to the north.
