= Killinure Point =

Peninsula in Lough Ree, County Westmeath, Ireland

Coordinates: 53.466°N 7.924°W

Killinure Point is a peninsula at the south-eastern end of Lough Ree in County Westmeath, Ireland on the River Shannon. Surrounded on three sides by water, it is the south-western peninsula of the Killinure electoral division. Killinure Point is on the mouth of the Inner Lakes namely Killinure Lough, Coosan Lough and Ballykeeran Lough. It is roughly 0.2 km from Coosan Point (by line of sight), which is the opposite side of the narrow waterway forming the mouth of the Inner Lakes.

== Etymology ==
The name Killinure derives from the Irish Coill an Iúir meaning 'wood of the yew tree'.

== Facilities ==
Killinure Point has a private marina with 100 berths, full services including a 25-ton travel hoist, boat hire and boat maintenance and repair facilities. The marina has been awarded the Blue Flag every year since 2003.

== History ==
The land at Killinure Point was the property of the local Waterston (or Waterstown) House landlord, originally granted in the Cromwellian era eventually changed into private hands in the late 19th century.

Killinure Point has historically been a crossing point (to reduce the distance on the journey into Athlone town) for people from Killinure and surrounding areas. There was a ferry service at Killinure Point operating for many years which ended only after a tragedy during the 19th century in which several people were drowned.
