= Tullycross, County Westmeath =

Townland in County Westmeath, Ireland

Tullycross is a townland near Athlone, County Westmeath, Ireland. The townland is in the civil parish of St. Mary's.

The townland stands to the east of the town, and is bordered by Annagh, Annaghgortagh and Moydrum to the east, Blyry Lower to the west and Ballykeeran to the north.
