= Thomas Stanton Lambert =

British Army general (1870/71–1921)

Major-General Thomas Stanton Lambert CB CMG
- Portrait by Walter Stoneman, 1919
- Born: 1870 or 1871
- Died: 20 June 1921 (aged 50); Athlone, Ireland
- Burial place: Brookwood Military Cemetery
- Military career
- Allegiance: United Kingdom
- Branch: British Army
- Service years: 1892–1921
- Rank: Major-General (temporary rank); Colonel (substantive rank)
- Unit: East Lancashire Regiment
- Commands: 1st Battalion, East Lancashire Regiment (1914–1915); 2nd Battalion, East Lancashire Regiment (1915–1916); 69th Infantry Brigade (1916–1918); 32nd Division (1918–1919); 13th Infantry Brigade (1919–1921)
- Conflicts: First World War; Irish War of Independence
- Awards: Companion of the Order of the Bath; Companion of the Order of St Michael and St George; Mentioned in Despatches five times

Major-General Thomas Stanton Lambert CB CMG (1870/71 – 20 June 1921) was a British Army officer who served in the First World War. He joined the East Lancashire Regiment in 1891 and held a succession of regimental and staff positions in the pre-war period. During the First World War, Lambert took part in the retreat from Mons and afterwards commanded his regiment's 1st Battalion at the First Battle of the Marne and the First Battle of the Aisne. He later commanded the regiment's 2nd Battalion and, temporarily, the 24th Infantry Brigade. He was placed in command of the 69th Infantry Brigade in March 1916 and from May 1918 commanded the 32nd Division. Lambert was mentioned in despatches five times for his work during the war and was appointed a Companion of the Order of St Michael and St George and a Companion of the Order of the Bath.

Lambert retained command of the 32nd Division for a time after the war, before reverting to brigade command. He was posted to Ireland just before the Irish War of Independence to command the 13th Infantry Brigade. On 20 June 1921, Lambert's car was ambushed by the Irish Republican Army, while he was travelling from a tennis match with a fellow officer and their wives. The party escaped but Lambert was wounded in the neck and died later that night.

== Early life and career ==
Thomas Stanton Lambert was brought up in Bradford-on-Avon, Wiltshire. He was the son of the Reverend R. U. Lambert and attended Charterhouse School in Surrey until 1889. Lambert attended the Royal Military College, Sandhurst, and was commissioned as a second lieutenant in the East Lancashire Regiment on 17 June 1891. Lambert was promoted to lieutenant on 18 October 1892 and to captain on 24 May 1900. Lambert was married to Geraldine Rachel Lambert. They had at least two sons: Edward Thomas Lambert, born on 19 June 1901 and William Harold Lambert, born 29 May 1905; both sons also attended Charterhouse. Lambert made a donation to the Lord Mayor of London's fund for the relief of the Indian famine of 1899–1900.

Lambert served as adjutant of his regiment between 26 January 1902 and 23 December 1904. He attended the Staff College, Camberley, from 23 January 1905 and returned to his regiment on 4 June 1907. On 2 August 1907 he was appointed a staff officer.

On 13 April 1910 he was made a staff captain at the War Office and on 15 February 1911 became a deputy assistant adjutant general (DAAG). Lambert was promoted to major on 13 September 1911 and returned to his regiment on 13 April 1914.

== First World War ==
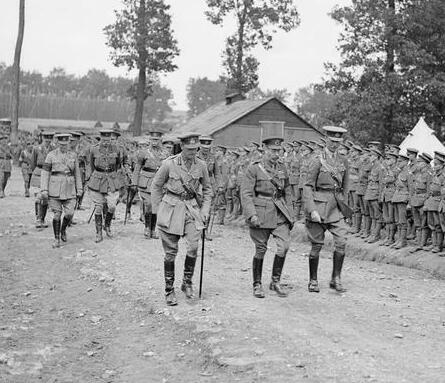
King George V with Major-General Eric Girdwood, GOC 74th (Yeomanry) Division, and Major-General T. S. Lambert, GOC 32nd Division, during his visit to the Second Army, possibly La Brearde, 6 August 1918. General Sir Herbert Plumer, GOC-in-Chief Second Army, can be seen in the background.

After the First World War broke out in August 1914, Lambert served on the Western Front with the 1st Battalion of his regiment. He was present during the Great Retreat from Mons and took photographs of his men with a personal camera. He commanded the battalion at the First Battle of the Marne and the First Battle of the Aisne in September.

Lambert was again appointed as a DAAG on 9 April 1915, serving in that post until 14 June. He then returned to his regiment to command its 2nd Battalion. Between 24 June and 16 July Lambert held temporary command of the 24th Infantry Brigade, his battalion's parent formation, and was granted the temporary rank of lieutenant colonel, which he relinquished, only to be granted it again two days later. On 7 November 1915 Lambert was appointed an assistant adjutant general (AAG), serving in that role until 1 January 1916.

On 9 March, Lambert was appointed to the temporary rank of brigadier general and placed in command of the New Army's 69th Infantry Brigade, part of the 23rd Division, which he led on the Italian front in late 1917 and into the spring of 1918. He was promoted to the substantive rank of lieutenant colonel on 28 May and to the brevet rank of colonel on 1 January 1917. Lambert was appointed a Companion of the Order of St Michael and St George in the 1918 New Year Honours. He was promoted to the temporary rank of major general on 31 May 1918, when he was appointed to command the 32nd Division, which, like the 69th Brigade, was a New Army formation, at the time serving on the Western Front. Lambert was appointed a Companion of the Order of the Bath "for valuable services rendered in connection with Military Operations in Italy" in the June 1918 Birthday Honours. During the course of the war Lambert was mentioned in despatches five times.

== Irish War of Independence ==
Lambert had formally left the East Lancashire Regiment in January 1919, as he had been confirmed in his appointment to command the 32nd Division. On 15 March he relinquished command of the division, along with his temporary major general's rank, reverting to his substantive rank of lieutenant colonel. On the same date he became commander of a brigade, and was granted the temporary rank of brigadier general. He relinquished command of the brigade on 25 September, though he managed to retain the temporary rank of brigadier general. He was promoted to the substantive rank of colonel on 13 October and the same month was granted command of the 13th Infantry Brigade, which was stationed in Athlone, Ireland, as part of the 5th Division.

Lambert's temporary rank became that of colonel commandant on 1 January 1921 as the army transitioned away from brigadier generals.

== Assassination and reprisals ==
In January 1919, the First Dáil, which was dominated by members of the Irish republican Sinn Féin political party, convened at Mansion House in Dublin and declared Ireland independent from both the United Kingdom and the British Empire. This resulted in what is now called the Irish War of Independence, which was fought from 1919 to 1922.

In early 1921, the First Dáil's paramilitary wing, the Irish Republican Army (IRA), learned that Col.-Com. Lambert often travelled by motorcar to play tennis with other British Army officers at Midges House, near Coosan. Meanwhile, IRA Director of Intelligence and guerilla warfare strategist Michael Collins had been determined to secure the release of Irish Volunteers General Seán Mac Eoin since the latter had been captured by the British in March 1921. Collins knew that, if a British officer of the same rank were also captured, General Mac Eoin could be released as part of a prisoner exchange. For this reason, Lambert was selected for abduction and orders were accordingly dispatched to the IRA flying column based in Tubberclare, which was part of the Athlone Brigade.

Lambert's car was ambushed on the way back from a tennis match on 20 June 1921. There were five occupants: Lambert, Colonel Challoner and Challoner's niece in the back seats and Mrs. Lambert, who was driving, and Challoner's wife in the front seats. A party of 14 IRA men, commanded by Captain John J. Elliott, lay in wait near Moydrum with rifles, pistols and shotguns; Lambert's car approached around 7.30 pm. Mrs. Lambert spotted the ambush and accelerated to break through it as no road block had been put in place. A warning shot was fired over the motorcar and, when it was ignored, it was followed by two more shots directed at the car's occupants. Col.-Com. Lambert was hit in the neck and Mrs Challoner slightly wounded, but the party escaped to safety. Lambert died at 9 pm that night at the Church of Ireland Military Hospital in Athlone, aged 50. He was buried at the Brookwood Military Cemetery in Surrey. His grave is in the care of the Commonwealth War Graves Commission.

On 21 June 1921, a group of Black and Tans burned down many homes in Knockcroghery, in reprisal for the attack on Colonel Commandant Lambert the day before.

After the ambush the British carried out an intensive search for the responsible IRA men. The Black and Tans knew that most IRA members in the area were farmers and so focused on farmhouses. In the early hours of 2 July a group of masked men in "trench coats and tweed caps" burnt five farmhouses in Coosan district and one at Mount Temple in retaliation for the assassination of Col.-Com. Lambert. The following day the IRA retaliated by burning down Moydrum Castle, the home of Anglo-Irish landlord Albert Handcock, 5th Baron Castlemaine.

Lambert was posthumously granted permission to wear the insignia of a commander of the Italian Order of Saints Maurice and Lazarus on 2 March 1923. He is remembered by a plaque in the Royal Memorial Chapel at Sandhurst. His personal papers are held in the archives of the Imperial War Museums.
