= Curragh (disambiguation) =

The Curragh is a plain in County Kildare, Ireland.

Curragh or Curraghs may also refer to:

Associated with the Curragh of Kildare

- Curragh Racecourse
  - Curragh Cup run at the course
- Curragh Camp, of the British Army and later the Irish Army
  - Curragh incident 1914 "mutiny" by British officers
  - Curragh Camp GAA
- Battle of the Curragh, 1 April 1234 between forces of the Lord of Ireland and the Lord of Leinster

Other

- Curragh coal mine in Central Queensland, Australia
- Curragh, Kilcumreragh, a townland in Kilcumreragh civil parish, barony of Moycashel, County Westmeath, Ireland
- Curragh, St. Mary's, a townland in St. Mary's civil parish, barony of Brawny, County Westmeath, Ireland
- Curraghs, Isle of Man wetland area
  - Curraghs Wildlife Park
- Currach, occasionally curragh, traditional Irish rowing boat

Note: There are more than 20 other townlands in Ireland with the name Curragh.
