= Hillquarter =

Townland in County Westmeath, Ireland

Hillquarter is a townland in Athlone, County Westmeath, Ireland. The townland, which is in the civil parish of St. Mary's, stands to the north of the town on the coast of the River Shannon and the adjoining Lough Ree. Coosan borders the townland to the east, and Clonbrusk is to the south.
