= Cornamagh, Westmeath =

Townland in County Westmeath, Ireland

Coordinates: 53.5295°N 7.7190°W

Cornamagh (Irish: Corr na mBeach) is a townland in Athlone, County Westmeath, Ireland. The townland is in the civil parish of St. Mary's.

The townland, which is bordered by Coosan to the west, is in the north of the town. Dubarry Park stands in the townland.
