= Lough Derg Yacht Club =

Boat club in County Tipperary, Ireland

- Burgee

- Ensign
- Short name: LDYC
- Founded: 1835
- Location: Dromineer, County Tipperary, Ireland
- Website: https://www.ldyc.ie/

Lough Derg Yacht Club is a boat club based in the lakeside village of Dromineer in County Tipperary, Ireland. Founded in 1835, it is one of the world's oldest yacht clubs. (Note: Neva Yacht Club 1718, Water Club, Cork 1720, Lough Ree Yacht Club 1770, Starcross Yacht Club 1772, Cumberland Fleet 1775, Royal Cork Yacht Club 1800, Royal Yacht Squadron 1815, Royal Northern Yacht Club 1824, Royal Western Yacht Club 1827, Royal North of Ireland Yacht Club 1827, Royal Swedish Yacht Club 1830, Royal Irish Yacht Club 1831.) The club is based in a modern clubhouse on the east shore of Lough Derg.

Lough Derg Yacht Club (LDYC) is one of a limited number of yacht clubs in Ireland with a fleet of Shannon-One-Design sailing dinghies. Other classes of boats sailed at LDYC include: Shannon one-design dinghy (founded 1922), National Squib one-design keelboat, International Laser Class, and International Mirror Class.

LDYC provides covered floating accommodation for fishing boats belonging to its members. The RNLI Lough Derg Lifeboat Station, the first inland lifeboat station to open in Ireland, is also located in the yacht club premises.

== History ==
Although Lough Derg Yacht Club was founded in 1835, it may have been in existence in some form before that date. The club's first regatta, led by Commodore Viscount Avonmore, was held in 1837 with events in Killaloe, Williamstown and Dromineer Bay and at Portumna. Through the early period of the club's life, they sailed large cutter rigged keelboats of displacement between 5 and 16 tons.

Commodores at the club in the mid-19th century included James Spaight Esq. of Derry (commodore in 1846), Bassett Holmes Esq. (1848 and 1859), Viscount Avonmore of Belle Isle (1849), and Hon. G.F.W. Yelverton (1857 to 1858). Up until 1883 the club organised events under its own rules- thereafter it operated under Yacht Racing Association (YRA) rules.

The first mention of centreboard boats racing at the club is 1893 when a race was held for mermaids.

The first one-design boat adopted by the club was the Dabchick class of centre-boarder designed by Linton Hope c. 1895. These boats were about 20 feet L.O.A. with a beam of 6 feet. They carried 200 sq.ft. sail area in a Bermudian rig with spinnaker. The Dabchick was followed by the Shannon one-design class designed by Francis Charles Morgan-Giles which began racing in 1922.

It is not known when the club merged with the Lough Derg Boat Club and thereby acquired a clubhouse at Dromineer, but it was about 1901.

The Mirror class world championships were hosted at Dromineer during summer 2013.
