= Clonbrusk =

Townland, County Westmeath, Ireland

Clonbrusk (Irish: Cluain Bhorraisc) is a townland in Athlone, County Westmeath, Ireland. The townland is in the civil parish of St. Mary's.

The townland covers the north section of the town, bordered by the River Shannon to the west, which forms the border with County Roscommon, and by the townlands of Athlone, Cloghanboy (Cooke), Cloghanboy (Homan), Coosan to the east.
