= Tubberclare =

Village in County Westmeath, Ireland

Tubberclare Tobar Chláir
- Village
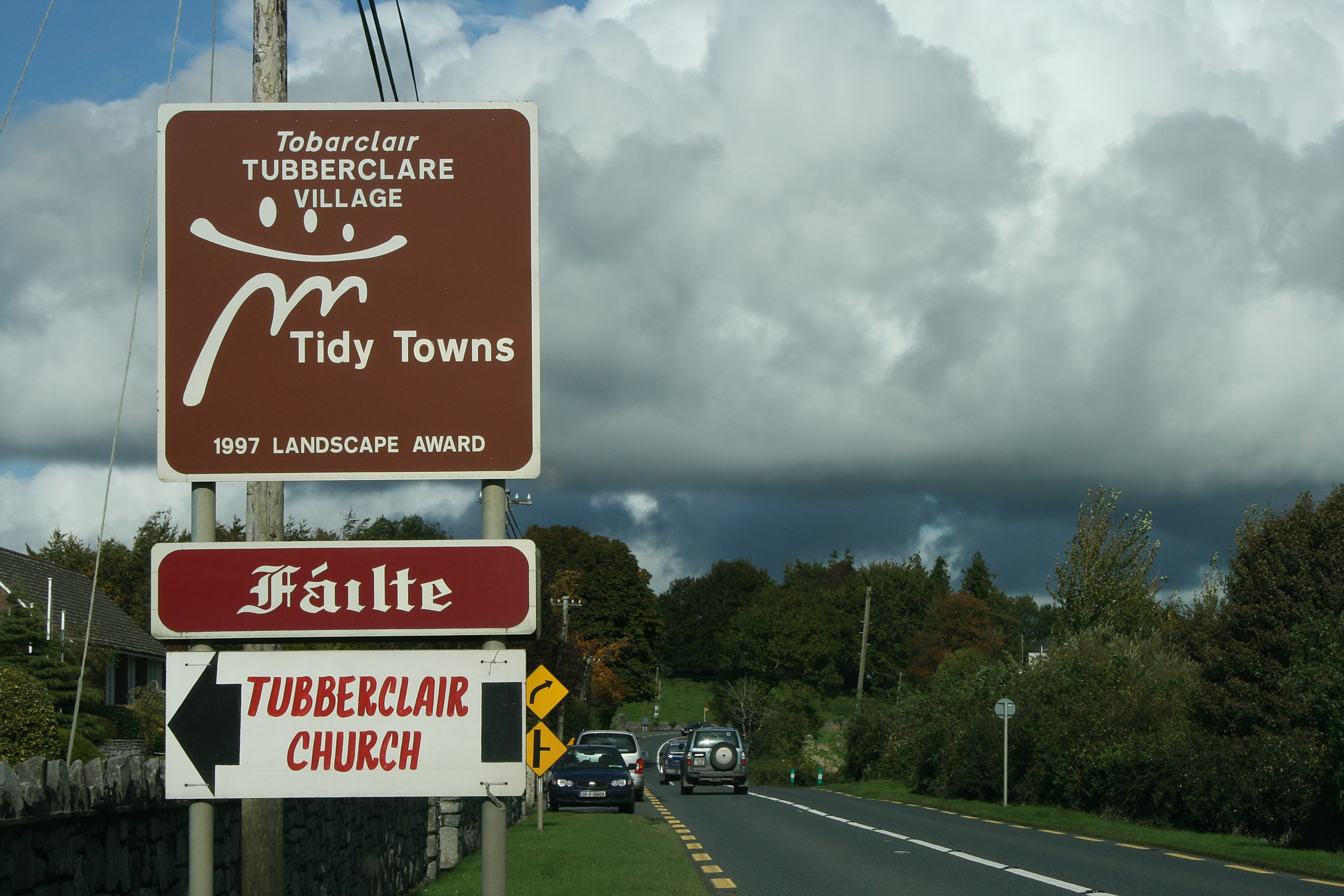
- Signage entering Tubberclare

- Location in Ireland
- Coordinates: 53°29′39″N 7°51′19″W
- Country: Ireland
- Province: Leinster
- County: County Westmeath
- Elevation: 80 m (260 ft)
- Time zone: UTC+0 (WET)
  - Summer (DST): UTC-1 (IST (WEST))
- Irish Grid Reference: N096493
- Website: www.westmeathcoco.ie

Tubberclare or Tubberclair (Irish: Tobar Chláir) is a village and townland in County Westmeath, Ireland, between Ballymahon and Athlone. It lies 9 km (6 mi) from Athlone, on the N55 national secondary road, and 2 km (1 mi) north of Glasson. Toberclare is the official spelling of the name in English.

Tubberclair is also the name of the surrounding parish, which includes the villages of Glasson and Ballykeeran. It borders Lough Ree on the Westmeath side.

== Name ==
The exact meaning of Tobar Chláir in Irish is uncertain. While the first element refers to a well, the second element clár may refer to a board. Alternatively, it could mean the well of the plain, as Tubberclare is a largely flat, fertile plain.

== Amenities ==
It is home to a primary school, community centre, heritage centre, shops, pubs, restaurants and many small businesses including marinas. It is also home to Tubberclair Gaelic football club which has provided several inter-county players over the years. It is also home to the Glasson Golf Hotel and Country Club, with a course designed by Christy O'Connor Jnr that borders Lough Ree.

== See also ==
- List of towns and villages in Ireland
