= Clonagh, Westmeath =

Townland (land division), Ireland

Coordinates: 53°26′36″N 7°54′11″W

Clonagh is a townland in County Westmeath, Ireland. The townland is in the civil parish of St. Mary's.

The townland stands to the north of Athlone, to the south of Kilinure Lough and Lough Ree.
