= Creaghduff South =

Townland in County Westmeath, Ireland

Creaghduff South is a townland in County Westmeath, Ireland. The townland is in the civil parish of St. Mary's.

The townland stands to the north of Athlone, on the shores of Coosan Lough. The townland is bordered by Creaghduff to the north, Coosan to the west and Tullin to the east.
