= Carrickobreen =

Townland in County Westmeath, Ireland

Coordinates: 53.3988°N 7.9232°W

Carrickobreen or Carrickobrien (Irish: Carraig Uí Bhraoin) is a townland in County Westmeath, Ireland. The townland is in the civil parish of St. Mary's.

The townland is located to the south of Athlone, and stands on the banks of the River Shannon, which forms the border with County Roscommon.
