= Friars Island =

Townland, Athlone, County Westmeath, Ireland

Coordinates: 53.456°N 7.904°W

Friars Island is a small townland near Athlone, County Westmeath, Ireland. The townland, which is 0.39 square kilometres (0.15 sq mi) in area, is in the civil parish of St. Mary's. The townland stands to the north of Athlone town, on the shores of Killinure Lough. As of the 2011 census, the townland contained no houses and was unpopulated.
