= Carberry Island =

Island in lake in Westmeath, Ireland

Coordinates: 53.4581°N 7.9582°W

Carberry Island (Irish: Oilean Chairbre) is a small uninhabited island in Lough Ree in County Westmeath, Ireland. Located near Athlone, the island was previously used by Athlone Yacht Club.
