= Ankers Bower =

- Townland
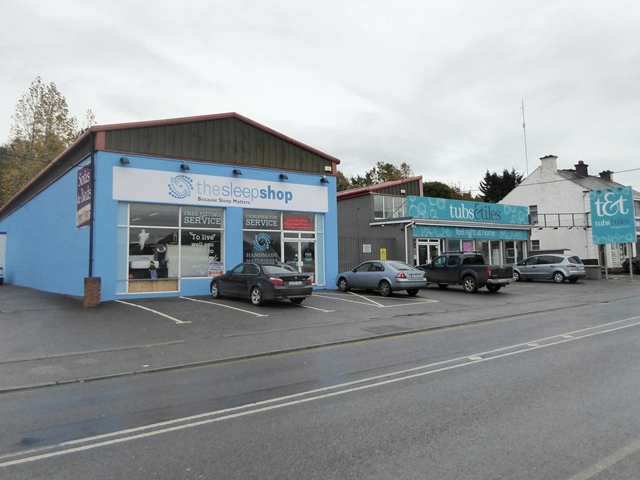
- Shops along R446 road in the northern part of Ankers Bower
- Interactive map of Ankers Bower
- Coordinates: 53.420°N 7.9255°W
- Civil parish: St. Mary's
- County: County Westmeath
- Country: Ireland

Ankers Bower (also Anker's Bower, Ankers' Bower, Ankersbower, or Anchor's Bower) is a townland and hill in St. Mary's civil parish in the barony of Brawny, County Westmeath, Ireland. It is partly within the former urban district of Athlone. The name may derive from John Ankers, who was vicar of St. Mary's in 1608.

== Population and area ==
The townland of Ankersbower, which has an area of 58.38 acres (23.63 ha), was uninhabited in 1841 and 1851, and had a population of 60 in 1861. The decennial censuses of Ireland from 1841 to 1911 included demographic data broken down by townland, except that from 1871 the area under the jurisdiction of town commissioners was combined into a single figure, with any rural portion of a townland listed separately. The rural portion of Ankersbower in 1871–1911 was uninhabited; its area was 21.96875 acres (8.89044 ha) in 1891 and 22.7625 acres (9.2117 ha) in 1911. A 2003 statutory instrument, the Athlone Town Boundary Alteration Order, 2003, included more of the townland within the Athlone town boundary; the Local Government Reform Act 2014 abolished Athlone town council.

Sitting largely within the town of Athlone in the Athlone East Urban electoral division, the townland had a population of 341 as of the 2011 census.
