= Moydrum Castle =

19th century ruin near Athlone, Ireland

- Caislean Maigh Droma
- Part of Moydrum demesne
- Moydrum, County Westmeath; Near Athlone in Ireland
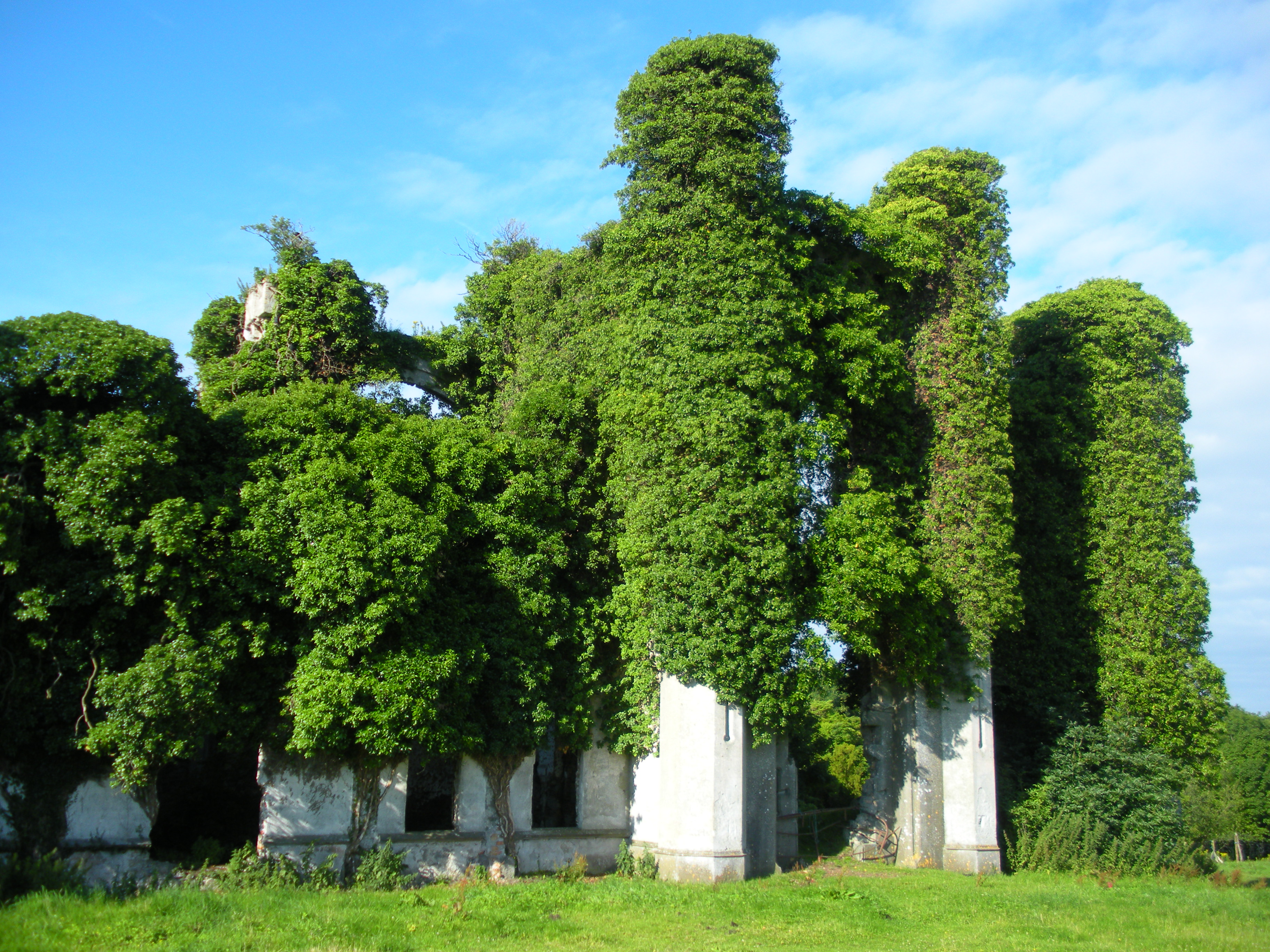
- Main facade covered in climbing ivy, 2010

Site information
- Type: Castle
- Condition: Ruin

Location
- Location within Ireland
- Area: 11,444 acres (46.3 km^{2})

Site history
- Built: 1812
- Architect: Richard Morrison
- In use: 1814—1924
- Fate: Set alight on 4 July 1921 by the IRA

Moydrum Castle (Irish: Caisleán Maigh Droma meaning "plain of the ridge") is a ruined castle situated in the townland of Moydrum in County Westmeath in Ireland, just to the east of Athlone. The property is privately owned.

== Background ==
The lands of Moydrum were granted by the English Crown to the Handcock family, originally from Devon in England, during the Cromwellian plantations of Ireland in the 17th century. From then on the family remained one of the most prominent landowning dynasties and landlords in the area. Moving forward several generations, head of family William Handcock served as a Member of Parliament (MP) in Grattan's Parliament, representing Athlone until the parliament’s dissolution following the Acts of Union 1800 with the United Kingdom. Handcock had originally been an opponent of the Act, but was promised a peerage should he vote in favour of it. He duly succumbed and finally, in 1812, Handcock was created 1st Baron Castlemaine. The Baron decided to create an appropriate stately home on his lands at Moydrum, and therefore asked architect Richard Morrison to remodel and enlarge an existing house belonging to the family there, built c.1750. The resulting gothic-revivalist castle was completed in 1814 and was described in A Topographical Dictionary of Ireland, published in 1837 by Samuel Lewis, as "a handsome castellated mansion [..] beautifully situated in an extensive demesne, on one side of which is a small lake".

By the 1880s, and the time of the 4th Baron, the Barony of Moydrum comprised 11,444 acres (46.3 km^{2}).

== Yachting ==
The Lords Castlemaine were prominent members of Lough Ree Yacht Club, and Major G.S. Handcock was Hon. Secretary of the club. In 1920, he was appointed chairman of a committee to agree on the design of an 18-foot one design dinghy for the Shannon Yacht Clubs which became known as the Shannon-One-Design.

== Destruction ==
During the Irish War of Independence, Major-general Thomas Stanton Lambert was killed by a flying column of the Irish Republican Army (IRA) near Moydrum on 20 June 1921, in a failed attempt to take him prisoner for a planned prisoner exchange with general Seán Mac Eoin. In reprisal, the Black and Tans burned several farmsteads in south Westmeath. Angered by the burnings, local IRA members decided to burn Moydrum Castle in retaliation. The castle was selected as a symbolic target given that it was the seat of Lord Castlemaine, a member of the House of Lords. On the night of 3 July, a group of IRA members went to the castle. Though Lord Castlemaine was not in Ireland at the time, his wife and daughter along with several servants were then at the castle, and were awoken by the IRA knocking on the castle's door. The IRA gave the occupants a brief period of time to gather some valuable belongings before being forced out, and the castle was set alight and completely destroyed.

Following the establishment of the Irish Free State, much of the land belonging to the Barony was improved, divided and sold on by the Irish Land Commission. The Baron, his wife and family were never to return to Moydrum. Photographer Anton Corbijn photographed Moydrum Castle for the cover of the Irish rock band U2's fourth studio album, 1984's The Unforgettable Fire and gave it a sepia tone. The photograph, however, was a virtual copy of a picture on the cover of a 1980 book In Ruins: The Once Great Houses of Ireland by Simon Marsden, for which U2 had to pay compensation. It was taken from the same spot and used the same polarising filter technique, but with the addition of the four band members. This photo was shot with infrared photographic film giving the leaves a light tone and the blue sky a very dark tone.

== Other Westmeath castles ==
- Ballinlough Castle
- Clonyn Castle
- Killua Castle
- Knockdrin Castle
- Tyrrellspass Castle
- Tullynally Castle
