= Cartrontroy =

Irish townland

Cartrontroy (Irish: Cartún Chruaich) is a townland in Athlone, County Westmeath, Ireland. The townland is in the civil parish of St. Mary's.

The townland is located in the east of the town, the R445 road runs through the centre of the area and the Dublin–Westport/Galway railway line runs through the south.
