= Garrynafela =

- Townland
- Location of Garrynafela within County Roscommon in the Republic of Ireland
- Coordinates: 53°26′50″N 7°55′03″W
- Country: Ireland
- Province: Leinster
- County: County Roscommon

Garrynafela (Irish: Garraí na Féile) is a townland in Athlone, County Westmeath, Ireland. The townland is in the civil parish of St. Mary's.

The townland stands to the north of the town, on the shores of Coosan Lough, and to the south of Killinure Lough.
