= Goldenisland =

Townland, Athlone, County Westmeath, Ireland

Goldenisland is a townland in Athlone, County Westmeath, Ireland. The townland is in the civil parish of St. Mary's.

The townland is located to the south of the town, on the banks of the River Shannon, which also forms the border with County Roscommon.
