= Portrun =

Townland in County Roscommon, Ireland

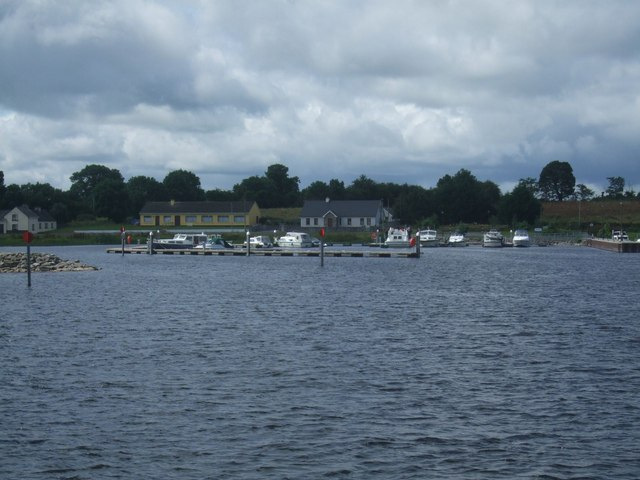
Moorings and jetty at Portrunny Bay

Portrun or Portrunny (Irish: Port Reanna, meaning 'bank of the point') is a lakeside townland, located on the bank of Lough Ree on the River Shannon in County Roscommon. It is 11.26 acres (0.046 km^{2}) in area.

It has mooring facilities for boats, a children's playground and picnic tables; and is a tourist destination in the summer months.

St. Diarmuid's holy well, associated with Diarmaid the Just, is located here. It is said that he often stopped in Portrun here on the way to the sanctuary of Inchcleraun (Quaker Island), where the ruins of seven churches can still be seen.
