= Lough Ree Yacht Club =

Irish sailing club

Lough Ree Yacht Club

Lough Ree Yacht Club is a sailing club based in Ballglass, Coosan, near Athlone, Ireland. Founded in 1770, albeit under the name Athlone Yacht Club, it claims to be one of the oldest yacht clubs in the world, although another Irish yacht club, The Royal Cork Yacht Club (formerly The Cork Water Club) has proven to be the world's first and oldest yacht club. In any event it is probably the oldest club based on an inland lake.

== History ==
The tradition of organised pleasure boating in Athlone goes back to at least 1731, with a regatta on the River Shannon amongst the 'diversions' promised for a festival week in the town. Athlone is founded on the River Shannon, just south of Lough Ree, the second largest of Ireland's big lakes.

Early activities included an annual regatta which was located around the hill in Hillquarter townland. This hill gave the organising committee a viewing position from which they could review the progress of the yachts. Other events appear to have involved a rendezvous at some agreed place and a cruise in company in the manner of a naval flotilla but racing eventually developed. From these incidental activities an organisation in the form of a club was established. Originally it was known as Athlone Yacht Club and was renamed Lough Ree Yacht Club in 1895, probably due to the financial difficulties which had been run into over the previous years. By this time most its members sailed out of a small, sheltered bay at Ballyglass, on Lough Ree itself; Ballyglass is recorded as the venue of the Annual Regatta as early as 1836.

The club members have since, the early twentieth century, owned their own premises. In July 2006, new, larger premises were officially opened, as the second substantial expansion of the clubhouse premises. Yet the original building built in the early twentieth century is now a "building-within-a-building", in that it now functions as the office housed entirely within the clubhouse proper. Jetty space was expanded with the addition of floating jetties with full facilities (power and water), and a new 2-level boathouse was constructed a year later.

In 2012, the club completed the acquisition of 3 acres of adjacent lands, which will enable further expansion of the club's facilities to meet the needs of its burgeoning membership.

== Longevity ==
Although the record of pleasure sailing on the waters around Athlone goes back to 1731, organised club sailing did not commence before 1770. And notwithstanding the change in name and premises during subsequent years, Lough Ree Yacht Club is said to be the second or third oldest club in the world. Ultimately this claim relies upon the club's own assertions on its origins. On the other hand, it has never been publicly challenged.

Whether the club is second or third oldest in the world depends upon whether an organisation described as the Flotilla of the Neva, St Petersburg, Russia, is a Yacht Club by modern or historical standards. It has been claimed that the Flotilla was established in 1718. However, there is little presence of the club on the World Wide Web, and one visitor in September 2005 described it as "not quite a yacht club". Although all old yacht clubs could be described thus at some point during their histories, not for their entire duration.

Accordingly, Lough Ree Yacht Club is arguably the second oldest yacht club in the world. The eldest, as it happens is also Irish, the Royal Cork Yacht Club.

== Watercraft ==
The club is closely, but not exclusively, associated with the Shannon-One-Design (SOD), a single-sail class of open clinker built boat designed for a crew of two. Subsequently, it was considered desirable to bring a third person along, and this has now become the class rule. The SOD was modelled on a traditional 18'-0" lake boat. The SOD was designed by Morgan Giles of Teignmouth. It was introduced to the Club in 1922 in response to a growing demand for a one-design competitive and less expensive dinghy. Over a hundred and forty have now been built for the Shannon Lakes. Some of the original fleet still continues to race. Sail numbers started at No. 32.

The largest and most significant event run by the club annually is a week-long event commencing on the August Bank Holiday.

Other than SOD's, the club is made up of a growing number of barge owners, as well as a large mixed cruiser class and a junior section. Junior sailing was introduced in 1968, and today instructs beginners with a fleet of Optimist, Laser, Mirror and Laser Pico dinghies.
