= Ballygowlan =

Townland (administrative area) in County Westmeath, Ireland

Coordinates: 53.3898°N 7.9171°W

Ballygowlan is a townland in County Westmeath, Ireland. The townland is in the civil parish of St. Mary's.

The townland lies to the south of Athlone, and is bordered to the west by the River Shannon.
