= Cloonbonny =

Townland in County Westmeath, Ireland

Coordinates: 53.3971°N 7.886°W

Cloonbonny or Clonbonny is a townland in County Westmeath, Ireland. The townland is in the civil parish of St. Mary's.

The townland stands to the southeast of Athlone, The River Shannon forms part of its western border, which in turn forms the border with County Roscommon. The Dublin–Westport/Galway railway line crosses the townland to the northeast.

The local national (primary) school is Clonbonny National School which, as of 2019, had an enrollment of 121 pupils.
