= Creggan Lower, Westmeath =

Townland in County Westmeath, Ireland

Creggan Lower is a townland in County Westmeath, Ireland. The townland is in the civil parish of St. Mary's.

The townland stands to the east of Athlone. The junction between the M6 motorway and the N62 road stands in the townland. The townland of Creggan Upper borders the area to the south.
