= Garrycastle, St. Mary's =

Townland in County Westmeath, Ireland

Garrycastle is a townland in Athlone, County Westmeath, Ireland. It is in the civil parish of St. Mary's.

The townland stands in east side of the Athlone town, and contains a section of the M6 motorway. The townland also contains a section of the Athlone to Mullingar Cycleway, which is part of the larger Dublin-Galway Greenway, as well as the Athlone Business and Technology Park. This business park contains a number of businesses including IDA Ireland, ESB Group and Teleflex.

The local GAA team is Garrycastle GAA.
