= Bunnavally =

Townland in County Westmeath, Ireland

Bunnavally is a townland in Athlone, County Westmeath, Ireland. The townland is in the civil parish of St. Mary's.

The townland covers an area in the south-east of the City Centre, with the Dublin–Westport/Galway railway line cutting through the area. The Athlone Institute of Technology stands in the north of the townland.
