= St. Mary's, Athlone (civil parish) =

Civil parish in County Westmeath, Ireland

St. Mary's
- Civil parish
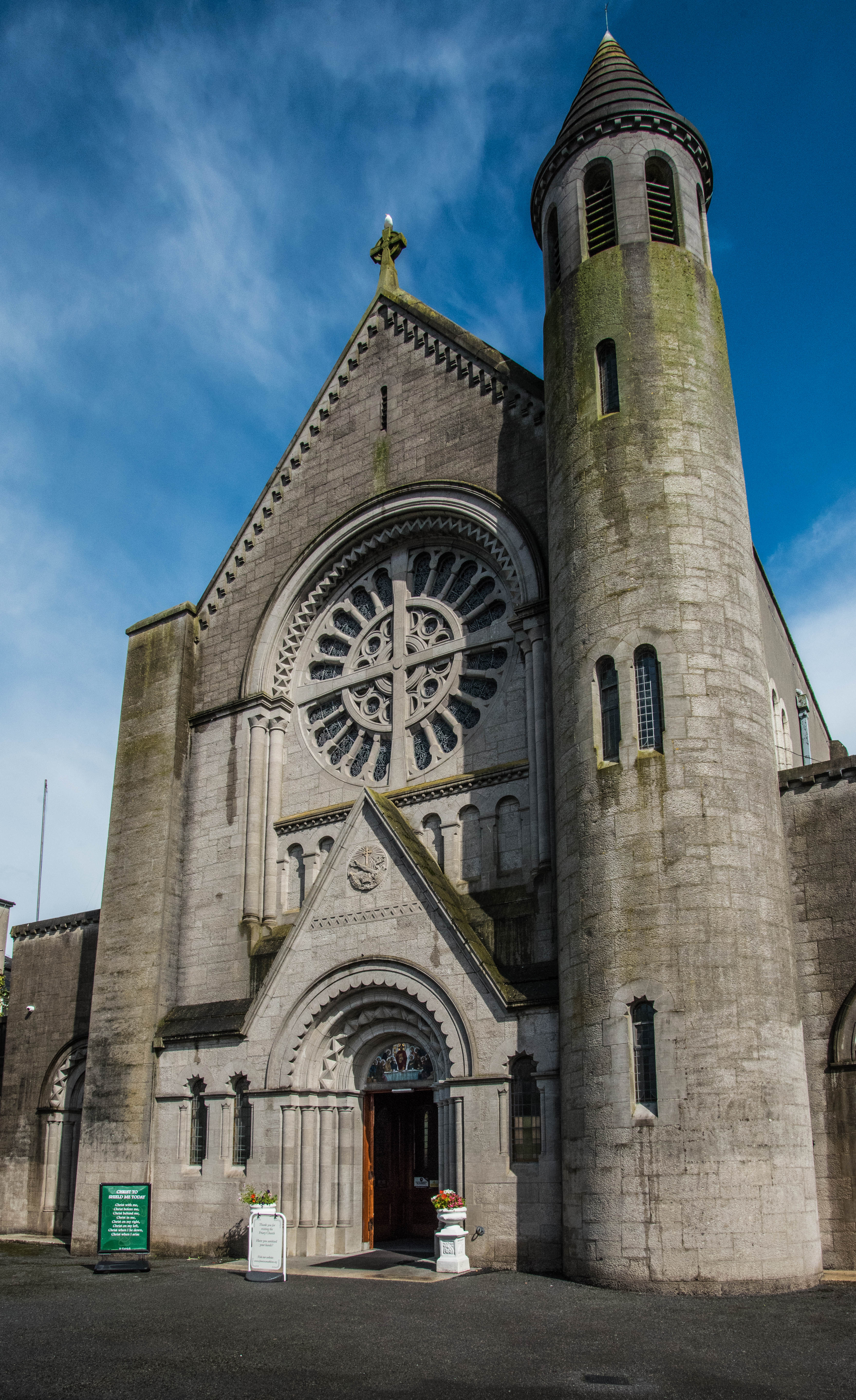
- St Anthony's Church, Athlone

- Location of St. Mary's within County Westmeath, Ireland
- Coordinates: 53°25′26″N 7°54′29″W
- Country: Ireland
- Province: Leinster
- County: County Westmeath
- Irish grid reference: N061415

St. Mary's is a civil parish in County Westmeath, Ireland. It is located about 40 km (25 mi) west–south–west of Mullingar.

St. Mary's is the sole civil parish in the barony of Brawny in the province of Leinster. The civil parish covers 12,069.4 acres (48.843 km^{2}).

St. Mary's civil parish comprises part of the town of Athlone, the village of Ballykeeran and 62 townlands: Aghacocara, Ankersbower, Ardnaglug, Athlone, Ballygowlan, Ballykeeran, Blyry Lower, Blyry Upper, Bunnahinly, Bunnavally, Cannonsfield, Cappankelly, Carrickobreen, Cartrontroy, Cloghanboy (Cooke), Cloghanboy (Homan), Cloghanboy (Strain), Cloghanboy West, Clonagh, Clonbrusk, Cloonbonny, Cloondalin, Collegeland, Cookanamuck, Coosan, Cornamaddy, Cornamagh, Corralena, Creaghduff, Creaghduff South, Creggan Lower, Creggan Upper, Crosswood, Curragh, Curragh (Mechum), Derries, Friars Island, Garrankesh, Garrycastle, Garrynafela, Goldenisland (St. George), Goldenisland, Goldenisland (Kilmaine), Hillquarter, Kilmacuagh (Castlemaine), Kilmacuagh (Cooke), Kilmacuagh (Mechum), Kilnafaddoge, Kippinstown, Lissywollen, Loughanaskin, Loughandonning, Magheranerla, Meehan, Moydrum (West), Retreat, Srameen, Tullin, Tullycross and Warrensfields.

The neighbouring civil parishes are: Kilkenny West to the north, Ballyloughloe to the east, Kilcleagh to the south–east and St. Peter's (County Roscommon) to the west.
