= Bunnahinly =

Townland (land division), Athlone, Ireland

Bunnahinly is a townland in Athlone, County Westmeath, Ireland. The townland is in the civil parish of St. Mary's.

The townland covers an area in the south-east of the town centre, with the Dublin–Westport/Galway railway line cutting through the area.
