= Creaghduff =

Townland in County Westmeath, Ireland

Coordinates: 53°27′25″N 7°55′48″W

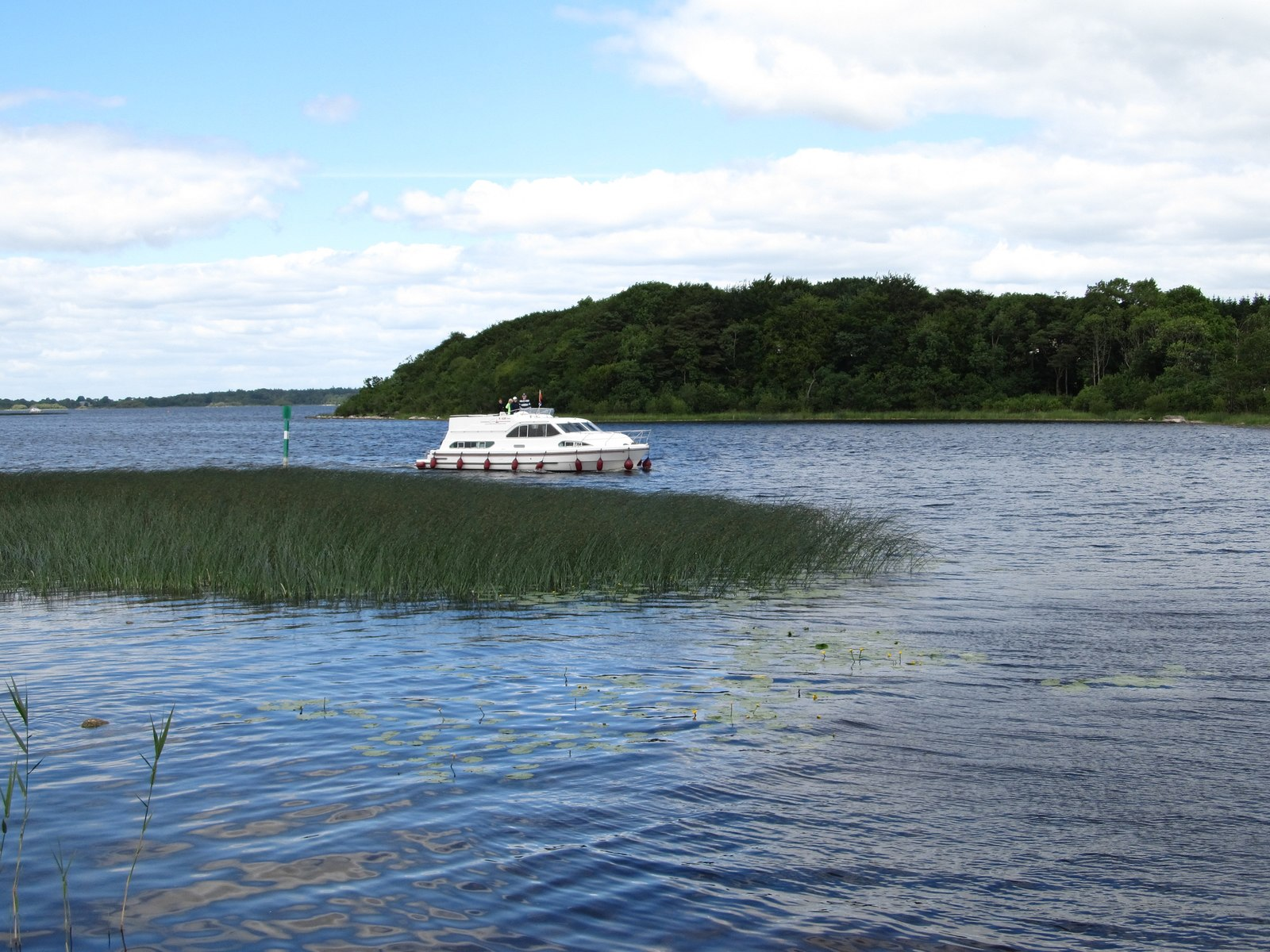
View of Lough Ree from Coosan Point

Creaghduff (Irish: An Chria Dhubh) is a townland in County Westmeath, Ireland. The townland is in the civil parish of St. Mary's.

The townland stands to the north of Athlone, on the shores of Lough Ree and Coosan Lough in an area known as Coosan Point. The townlands of Coosan and Creaghduff South border the townland to the south.
