= Creggan Upper, Westmeath =

Townland in County Westmeath, Ireland

Creggan Upper is a townland in County Westmeath, Ireland. The townland is in the civil parish of St. Mary's.

The townland stands to the east of Athlone. The j M6 motorway and the N62 road stands in the townland. The townland of Creggan Lower borders the area to the north.
