= Athlone (townland) =

Townlands in County Westmeath, Ireland

Coordinates: 53.4249°N 7.9390°W

Athlone is the name given to two bordering townlands in County Westmeath, Ireland. The townlands are in the civil parish of St. Mary's.

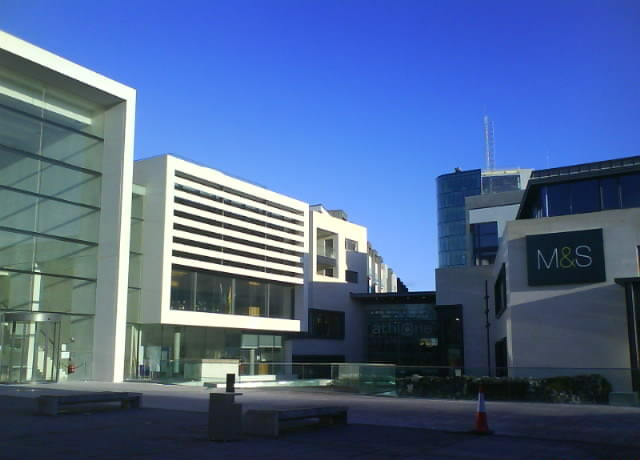
Athlone Towncentre, a shopping centre that opened in 2007, is located within the townland

The northern townland covers much of the northern area of the town of Athlone, with the M6 motorway cutting through the northern part of the area. The southern townland contains most of the shopping district of the town, including the Athlone Towncentre shopping centre. Athlone railway station is also within the southern townland. Both townlands are bordered to the west by the River Shannon.
