= Ship's articles =

Legal documents for maritime commerce

The ship's articles (shipping articles, more formally the ship's articles of agreement) is the set of documents that constitute the contract between the seafarer and the captain (master) of a vessel. They specify the name of the ship, the conditions of employment (including the size and ratings of the intended complement), seafarer's compensation (shares or payments), the nature of the voyage(s) and duration, and the regulations to be observed aboard ship and in port, including punishable offenses and punishments. Traditionally, each seafarer is required to sign the articles, and the articles include for each seafarer, their rating, the place and the day of signing on and the place and the date of signing off of the ship.

== History ==
Ships' articles developed as part of the Law Merchant (Lex mercatoria). Early trading vessels were often cooperative efforts where the crew, or some members, contributed to the initial costs of ship, cargo and operations; and payment was in shares at the end of the voyage. Thus all members of a crew were considered participants in the enterprise, even if they only contributed labour. This became widely recognized under the legal concept of a "community of joint hands" (Gesamthand in German, comunidad in mano in Spanish).

Early ship's articles were not written, as few were literate. But by the eighteenth century most sailors expected the articles to be written, even if they themselves could not read. Finally in the 1800s legislation in many countries required that ships' articles be written down, and freely available to any ensigned sailor.

=== Privateers and pirates ===
In the seventeenth and eighteenth centuries, the ship's articles of privateers and pirates evolved into an authority independent of the laws of any nation. Although the such articles were not completely uniform across ships and crews, there were common themes that came to be known as the "Jamaica discipline".

== Compensation ==
In addition to monetary payments, seafarers on ships traditionally received housing (berth), board (food and provisions), medical care (ship's doctor), and sometimes things like laundry services or an alcohol allowance. This as often expressed in the ship's articles as so much "a month and found".

== Usage ==
Ship’s articles are considered part of a "ship's papers", which constitute the legal environment aboard ship. They are required in resolving disputes between seafarers and their captains, as well as between seafarers and the ship's and cargo's owners. They are presented to port authorities and foreign consular officials to establish the bona fides of a ship.
