= Crosswood =

Townland in County Westmeath, Ireland

Crosswood (Irish: Coill na Croise) is a townland in County Westmeath, Ireland. The townland is in the civil parish of St. Mary's.

The townland stands to the east of Athlone. The Dublin–Westport/Galway railway line runs through the centre of townland.
