= Curragh, St. Mary's =

Townland in County Westmeath, Ireland

Curragh is a townland in Athlone, County Westmeath, Ireland. The townland is in the civil parish of St. Mary's.

The townland stands in the north of the town. Athlone Town Stadium stands partly in the townland (with half in the neighbouring townland of Lissywollen), along with a portion of the M6 motorway.
