= Athlone Towncentre =

Shopping centre in County Westmeath, Ireland

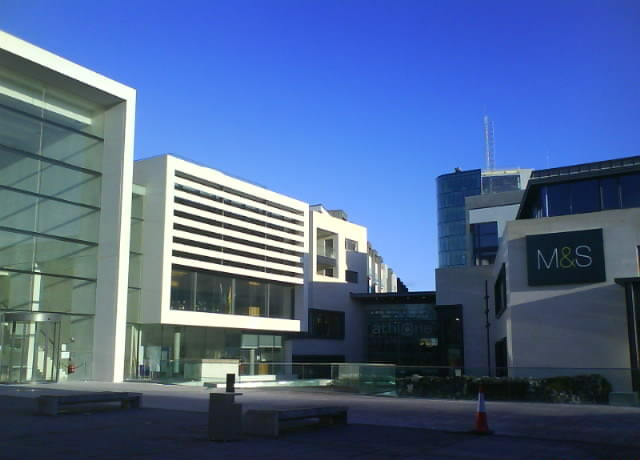
- Location: Athlone, County Westmeath, Ireland
- Coordinates: 53°25′25.784″N 7°56′10.161″W
- Opened: 1 November 2007; 19 years ago
- Owner: Davidson Kempner Capital Management (2015–present)
- Num. of stores: 60
- Num. of anchor tenants: 2
- Floor area: 13,000 square metres (140,000 sq ft)
- Floors: 2
- Parking: Multi-storey (1,200 spaces)
- Website: athlonetowncentre.com

Athlone Towncentre is a shopping centre located in central Athlone, County Westmeath, Ireland. It opened in November 2007. It is the largest shopping centre in the Irish midlands, with over 13,000 square metres of retail space and over 60 stores, including ZARA, TK Maxx, Marks and Spencer, River Island, Starbucks, Tommy Hilfiger, JD Sports, Next, Skechers, Sports Direct and H&M. The shopping centre is located at the site of the former Royal Hoey Hotel, which closed in 2002 and was demolished in 2005.

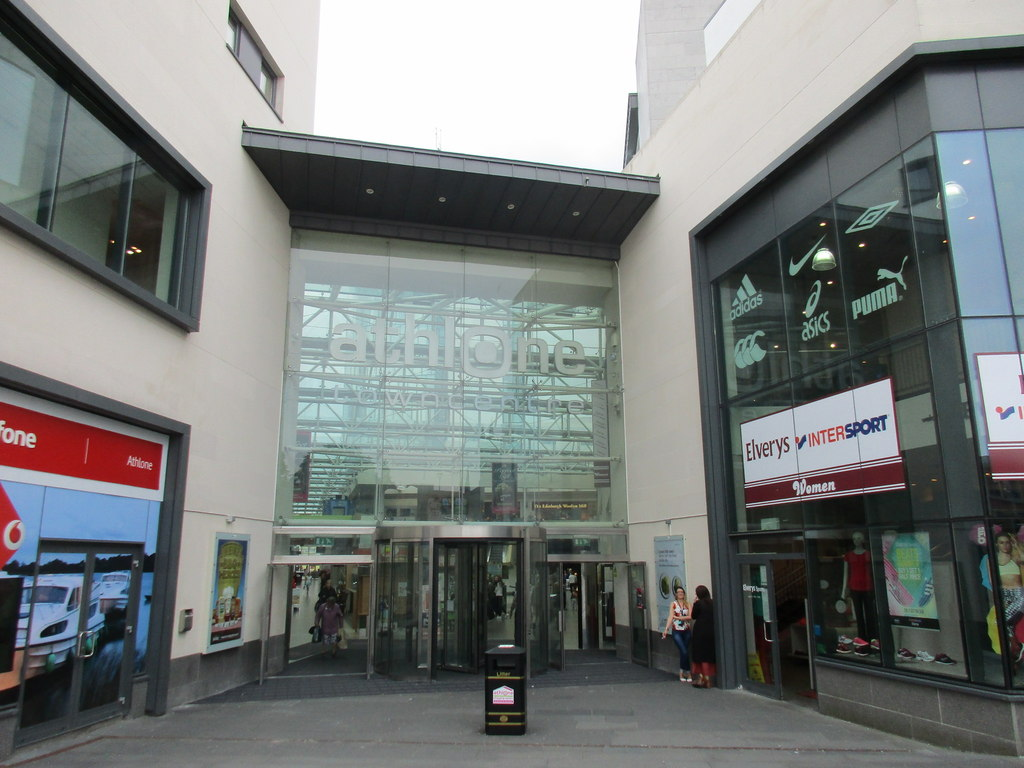
Entrance to the shopping centre

The shopping centre is located close to the centre of Athlone town, on a site accessible from Dublin Gate Street and Gleeson Street.

The 4-star Sheraton Athlone Hotel adjoins the centre, featuring a 12-storey, 42.25-metre (138.6 ft), tower building and has 161 beds. On October 16th, 2026, an incident occurred in the hotel, leading to a failure in the sprinkler system and the shopping centre underwent extensive flooding.
