= Killinure Lough =

Lake in County Westmeath, Ireland

- Loch Choill an Iúir (Irish)
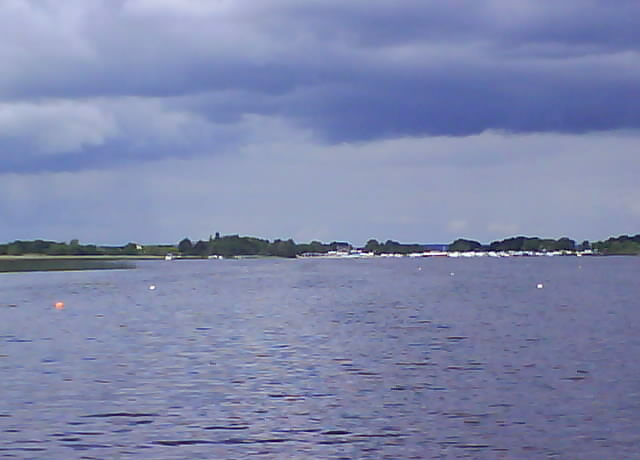

- Location within Ireland
- Location: County Westmeath, Ireland
- Coordinates: 53.459369°N 7.897106°W
- Primary inflows: Breensford River, Coosan Lough, Glassan River
- Primary outflows: Lough Ree
- Basin countries: Ireland
- Surface area: 2.6 km^{2} (1.0 sq mi)
- Surface elevation: 36 m (118 ft)
- Islands: Carberry Island, Temple's Island, Thatch Islands East, Cookanamuck, Garnagh Island, Sramore Islands,
- Settlements: Glassan, Ballykeevan

Killinure Lough is a lake in County Westmeath, Ireland, which feeds into Lough Ree on the Shannon.

== Wildlife ==
The lough is a brown trout and eel fishery.

== See also ==
- List of loughs in Ireland
