= Francis Charles Morgan-Giles =

England boat designer and builder (1883–1964)

- Francis Charles Morgan-Giles
- Born: 1883
- Died: 19 March 1964 (aged 80–81)
- Occupation: Boat builder
- Known for: Morgan-Giles Limited

Francis Charles Morgan-Giles (1883 – 19 March 1964) was a boat designer and builder from Devon, England. He built rowing boats, dinghies, yachts and large motor cruisers. His boats were known for their high quality, elegance and craftsmanship.

== Early years ==
Francis Charles Morgan-Giles was born 29 October 1882 in Kingston, Surrey.(Birth Certificate) As a boy he was interested in sailing, particularly in dinghies. In 1896, when aged 14, he began a fee-paying apprenticeship with the boat builders Pengelly and Gore of Ringmore. He then joined Gann and Palmer of Teignmouth. He had private tuition in science and mathematics.

In 1901 Morgan-Giles moved to London and started a business in Hammersmith designing small wooden boats for cruising and racing. Harry May joined him in 1909, and they formed Morgan Giles and May, Naval Architects and Yacht Builders. The partners had an office off the Strand and a boat building yard in Hammersmith beside the River Thames. In 1908–09 Morgan-Giles's future wife, Ivy Carus-Wilson, ordered a 14 feet (4.3 m) racing dinghy named Myosotis from the company, in which she competed with great success. Their first son, Morgan Charles Morgan-Giles, was born on 19 June 1914.

Morgan-Giles and May took over the former Popham yard at Hythe in 1911. In 1914 they dissolved their partnership and Morgan-Giles continued as a designer on his own. After the outbreak of World War I (1914–18) Morgan-Giles commanded coastal patrol boats in the Royal Naval Volunteer Auxiliary Patrol Service. He became a Lieutenant in the Royal Naval Volunteer Reserve.

== Morgan-Giles Limited ==
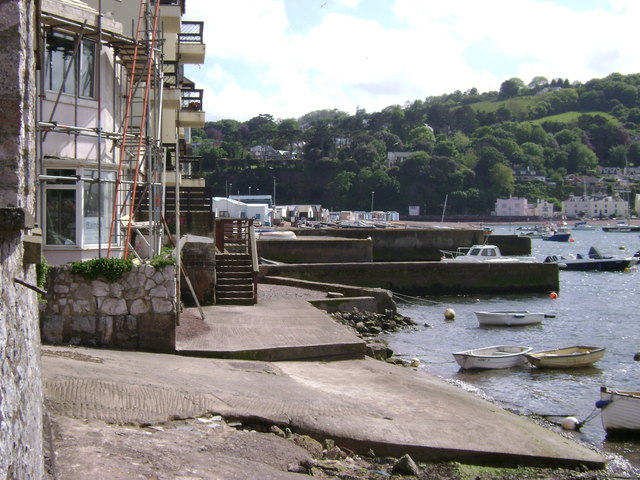
Walls and jetty of the Morgan-Giles boatyard

Morgan-Giles left the service in 1920 and bought the former Gann and Palmer shipyard in Teignmouth, naming it Morgan-Giles Limited. The shipyard was derelict and required repairs before it could start operation. The yard designed and built boats for racing and leisure, including rowing boats, dinghies, motor launches and small cabin cruisers. It built more than 1,000 yachts. The boat yard became famous internationally for its elegant and high-quality boats built by skilled craftsmen, shipwrights, engineers, joiners and riggers.

The Lady Cable, a pleasure boat built in 1923, later helped in the Dunkirk evacuation in May–June 1940 and seems to have been the last small boat to depart from the beach. His eldest son, Morgan Morgan-Giles, joined the navy in 1932 at the age of 18, served with distinction in World War II (1939–45), and later rose to the rank of rear-admiral.

With the outbreak of World War II the boatyard was expanded and selected by the Admiralty for repair and construction of naval vessels. Up to 150 men and women worked at the yard, and built pinnaces, motor launches and motor torpedo boats. After the return of peace the yard resumed construction of pleasure boats, including motor launches and canal cruisers. The yard also continued to do some work for the Admiralty including patrol boats, minesweepers and sailing boats for Royal Naval College at Dartmouth. The six sailing boats built for naval training were the Pegasus, Wyvern, Gryphis, Martlet, Leopard and Galahad. Morgan-Giles refused to work with fibreglass, saying "God made man so he could float upon a piece of wood".

Francis Charles Morgan-Giles died on 19 March 1964, aged 81. Several of his wooden or galvanised steel yachts are still in use today, such as the 8 metres (26 ft) Hispania VI, built for King Alfonso XIII of Spain. The yard was bought by John Roberts. Francis' son, Michael Morgan-Giles, directed the yard for a few more years under the Morgan Giles name. After Roberts died the yard was used by other companies. It was completely demolished by 1984 and is now occupied by apartment blocks. The old slipways have survived.

== Designs ==
The boat designs of F. Morgan-Giles were all provided with chronological numbers. The classes designed by Francis Morgan-Giles include:

Class	Length		First built	
	feet	metres		
Estuary One - Design (UK)	18.00'	5.49m	1911	
Essex One - Design (UK)	18.0Trea0'	5.49m		
Trearddur Bay Myth - design (UK)	14'-0"	4.26m.	1919	
Shannon One - Design	18.00'	5.49m	1920	Design No. 201.
West Channel Class	31.50'	9.60m	1949	
Morgan-Giles 30 (Note: The Morgan Giles 30, a sloop-rigged cruiser-racer, was designed in 1964 by Kenneth Collyer, the chief designer for Morgan Giles. F.C. Morgan Giles saw and approved a small model, but did not see the finished boat. The design was later adapted for fibreglass construction.)	30.00'	9.14m	1965	

== Sources ==
- Atkin, Gavin (12 March 2013), "Teignmouth and Shaldon Museum Opens Morgan Giles Exhibition 'Launched in Teignmouth'", intheboatshed.net
- Dalyell, Tam (7 May 2013), "Rear-Admiral Sir Morgan Morgan-Giles Naval officer who went on to become an MP", The Independent
- "F. C. Morgan Giles (1883-1964)", Sailing Networks
- "Francis Charles Morgan-Giles", sailboatdata.com
- "Morgan Giles 30 Yachts", MG30.org
- "Morgan Giles Exhibition 8 March - 5 April", Bishopsteignton
- Morgan Giles TS Monaco 38 ft Motor Yacht 1968, Sandeman Yacht Company
- "Rear-Admiral Sir Morgan Morgan-Giles", The Telegraph, 5 May 2013
- "Yacht Brokers review Morgan Giles 43' Sailing Yacht", Boatshedkent.com, 16 April 2010
