= Ballykeeran =

Village in County Westmeath, Ireland

Ballykeeran Bealach Caorthainn
- Village
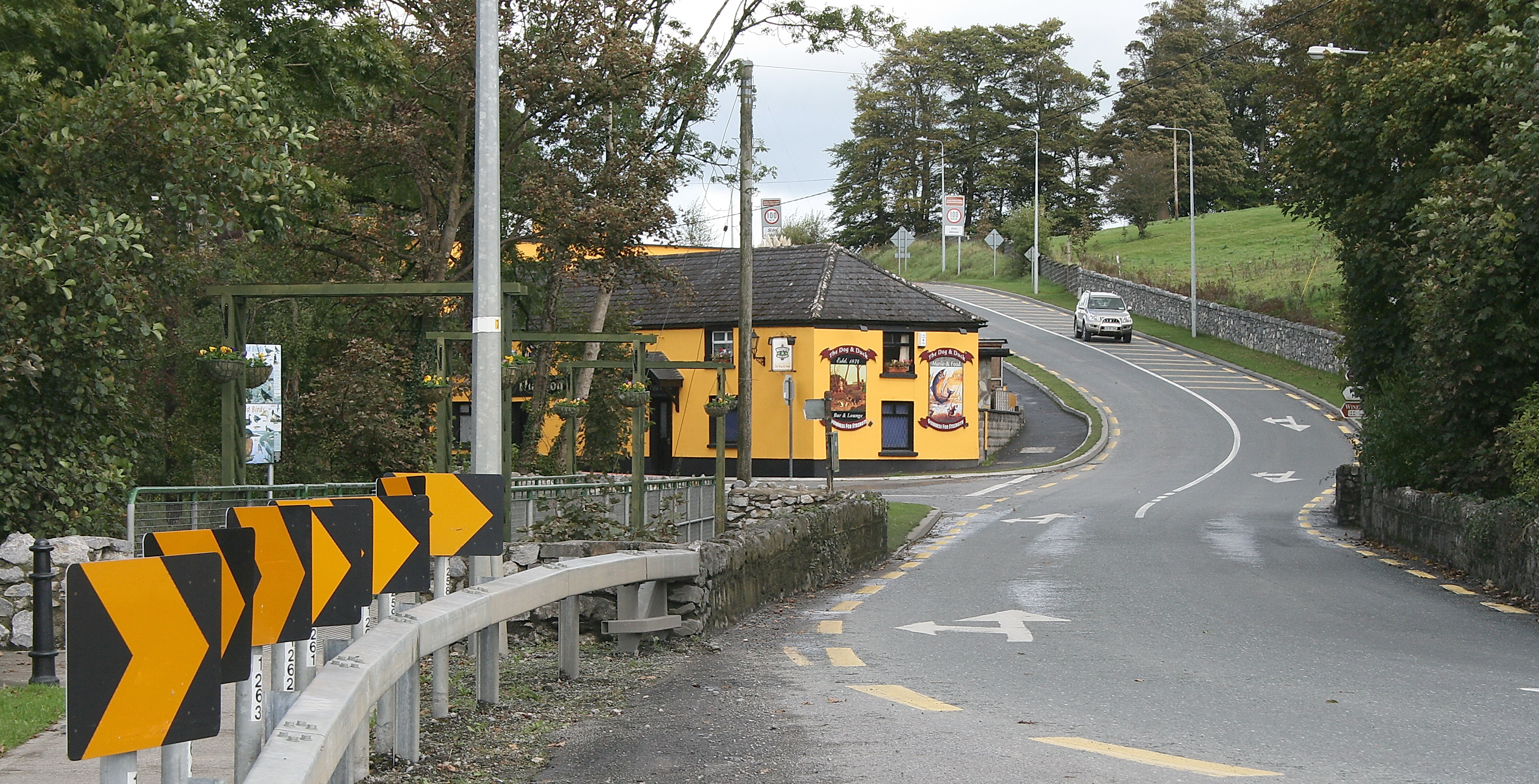
- N55 road passing the local pub in Ballykeeran

- Location in Ireland
- Coordinates: 53°27′00″N 7°53′00″W
- Country: Ireland
- Province: Leinster
- County: County Westmeath
- Elevation: 56 m (184 ft)
- Time zone: UTC+0 (WET)
  - Summer (DST): UTC-1 (IST (WEST))
- Irish Grid Reference: N072442

Ballykeeran (Irish: Bealach Caorthainn, meaning 'road of the rowan trees') is a small village in County Westmeath, Ireland, near Glassan. It is located on the N55 road in the townland of Annagh overlooking Lough Ree.

== Features ==
There are tourist accommodations, a caravan park, and a local pub. Moreover, the Breensford River, which flows through the settlement, is home to a historic mill. At one stage in history this was used as an RIC barracks.

== See also ==
- List of towns and villages in Ireland
