= Old Rail Trail =

Trail in Ireland

Coordinates: 53.435979°N 7.568348°W

Old Rail Trail (Athlone to Mullingar Cycleway)
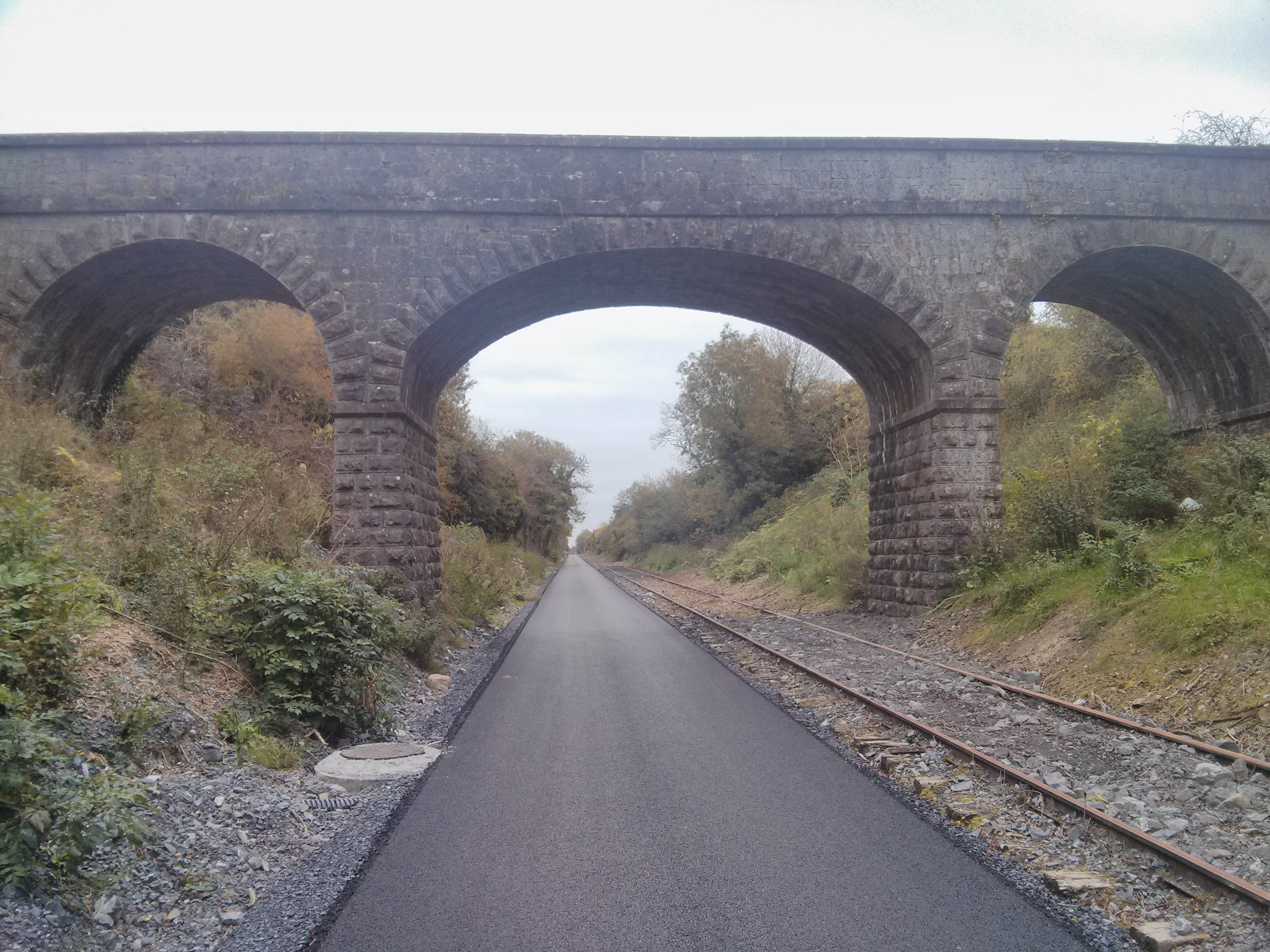
- Bridge on the greenway
- Length: 42 kilometres (26 miles)
- Location: County Westmeath, Ireland
- Trailheads: Mary O'Rourke Bridge, Athlone; Mullingar Newbrook
- Use: Cycling, walking
- Difficulty: Easy
- Season: Any
- Surface: Tarmac
- Website: Athlone.ie - Old Rail Trail

Map of the EuroVelo 2 route.

The Old Rail Trail (also known as Athlone to Mullingar Cycleway) is a long-distance cycling and walking trail in County Westmeath, which forms a section of the Dublin-Galway Greenway. It is a 42 kilometres long rail-trail over the disused Athlone-Mullingar rail line beginning in Athlone and ending in Mullingar.

== History ==
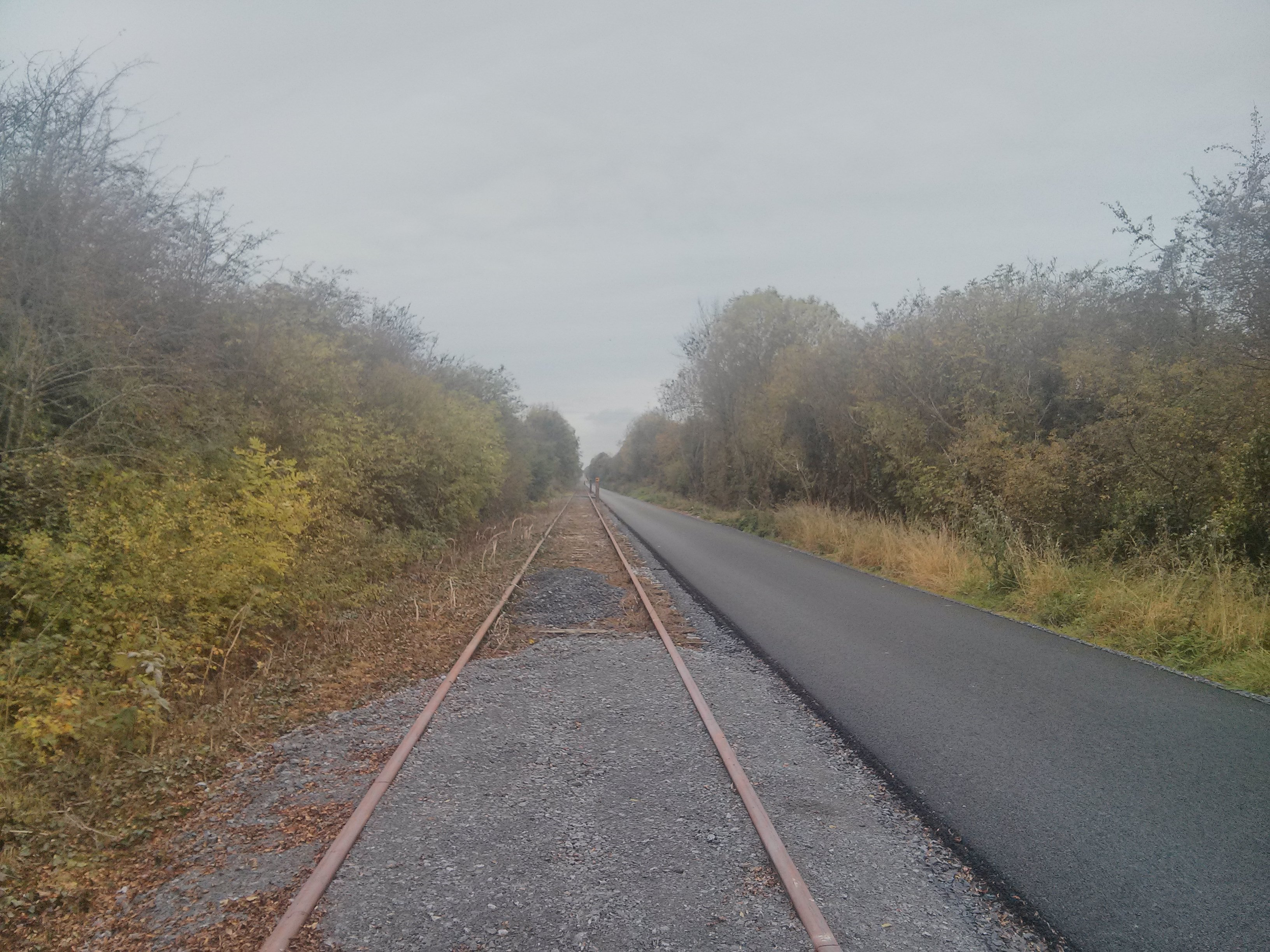
Looking towards Athlone

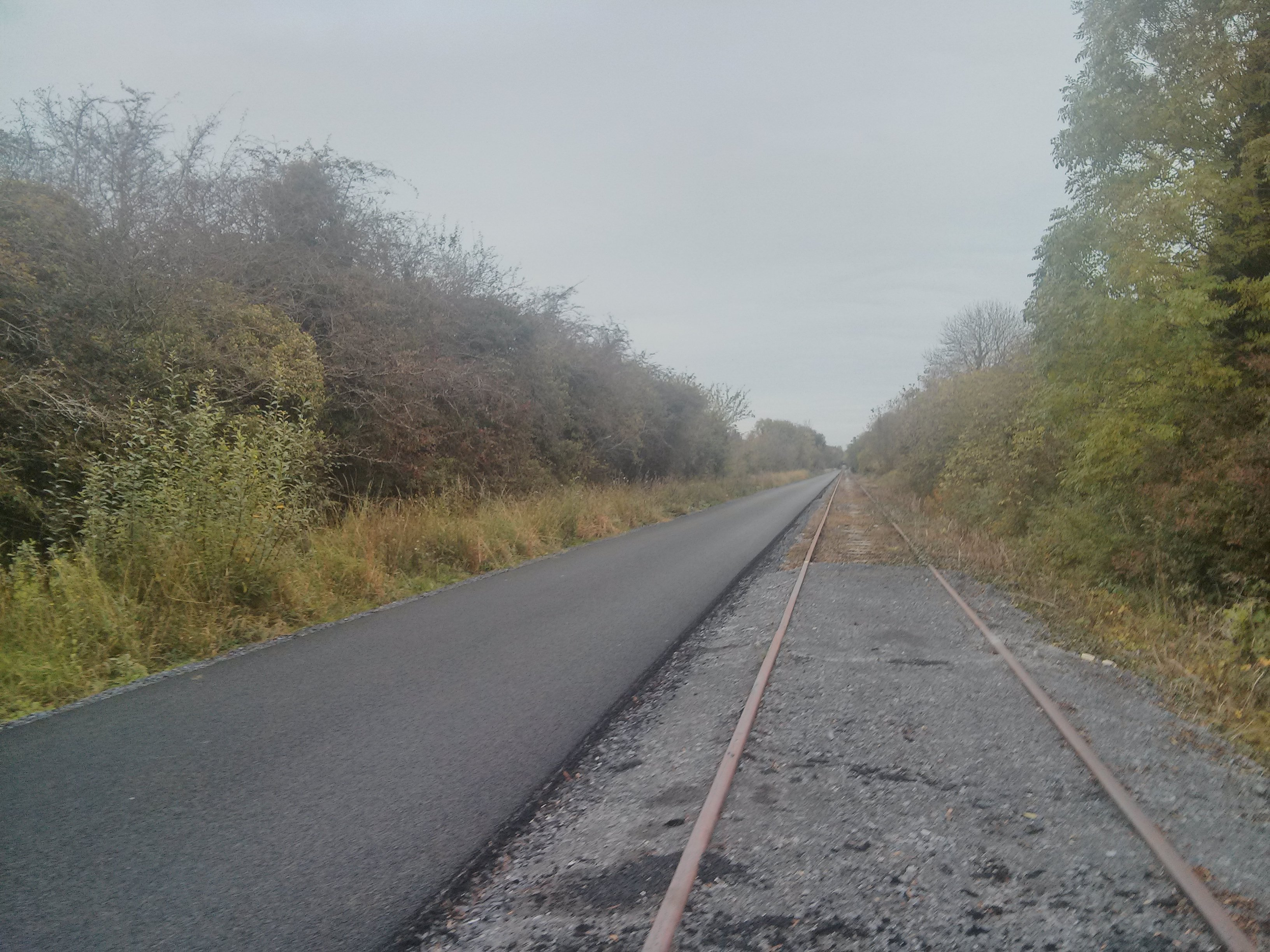
Looking towards Mullingar

The route was originally opened in 1851 as a railway line by the Midland Great Western Railway and was the first to reach Athlone from Dublin. The line was closed in 1987 with trains using the former Great Southern and Western Railway line to reach Athlone.

The Moate-Garrycastle section was officially opened by Taoiseach Enda Kenny in October 2015. In September 2015 the Westmeath Independent reported that the greenway could provide a "€15m boost" to the local economy.

The section was extended up to Ballymahon road (White gates) in December 2016, and in October of 2022, the trail expanded to athlone.

A new bridge to cross the River Shannon in Athlone was allocated €8.1m funding and began construction in 2021. The bridge, later named the Mary O'Rourke Bridge, opened in August 2023.

== Kilbeggan link ==
As of 2015, plans by a community development organisation in Kilbeggan, County Westmeath, were underway to connect the Greenway to the Offaly Cycleways at Kilbeggan with a greenway to Tullamore, County Offaly. The preferred route, extending the Kilbeggan - Ballycommon greenway, including Belvedere House and Gardens and linking the Royal and Grand Canals, was published by Westmeath County Council and Transport Infrastructure Ireland in October 2025.

== Access points ==
The following is a list of the access points to the cycleway.

Location	Distance from Athlone (km)	Distance to Mullingar (km)	Coordinates
Mary O'Rourke Bridge	-	43	53.424000, -7.943297
Abbey Road, Athlone	-	43	53.426547, -7.942494
Whitegates, Athlone	-	42	53.427995, -7.931805
Garrycastle, Athlone	-	40	53.422411, -7.899979
Mount Temple	6	34	53.402258, -7.816096
Maghermore	8	32	53.399294, -7.781841
Moate (Dún na Sí Park)	12	28	53.398406, -7.736041
Moate (Station)	12	28	53.399177, -7.723514
Rosemount	18	22	53.415931, -7.641321
Lisnagree	21	19	53.415931, -7.641321
Streamstown	23	17	53.435258, -7.570478
Garhy (R391)	26.2	13.8	53.450029, -7.531310
Castletown Station	28	12	53.454793, -7.522229
Dysart	30	10	53.476641, -7.480747
Ballinea	36	4	53.502709, -7.431523
Bellmount	37.2	2.8	53.508298, -7.403209
Kilpatrick	38.4	1.6	53.509364, -7.390320
Mullingar Newbrook (Canal Link)	40	-	53.517095, -7.368273
Mullingar Newbrook (Roundabout Access)	42	-	53.509364, -7.390320

== See also ==
- EuroVelo
