= Glassan =

Village in County Westmeath, Ireland

Glasson Irish: Glasán Glassan
- Village
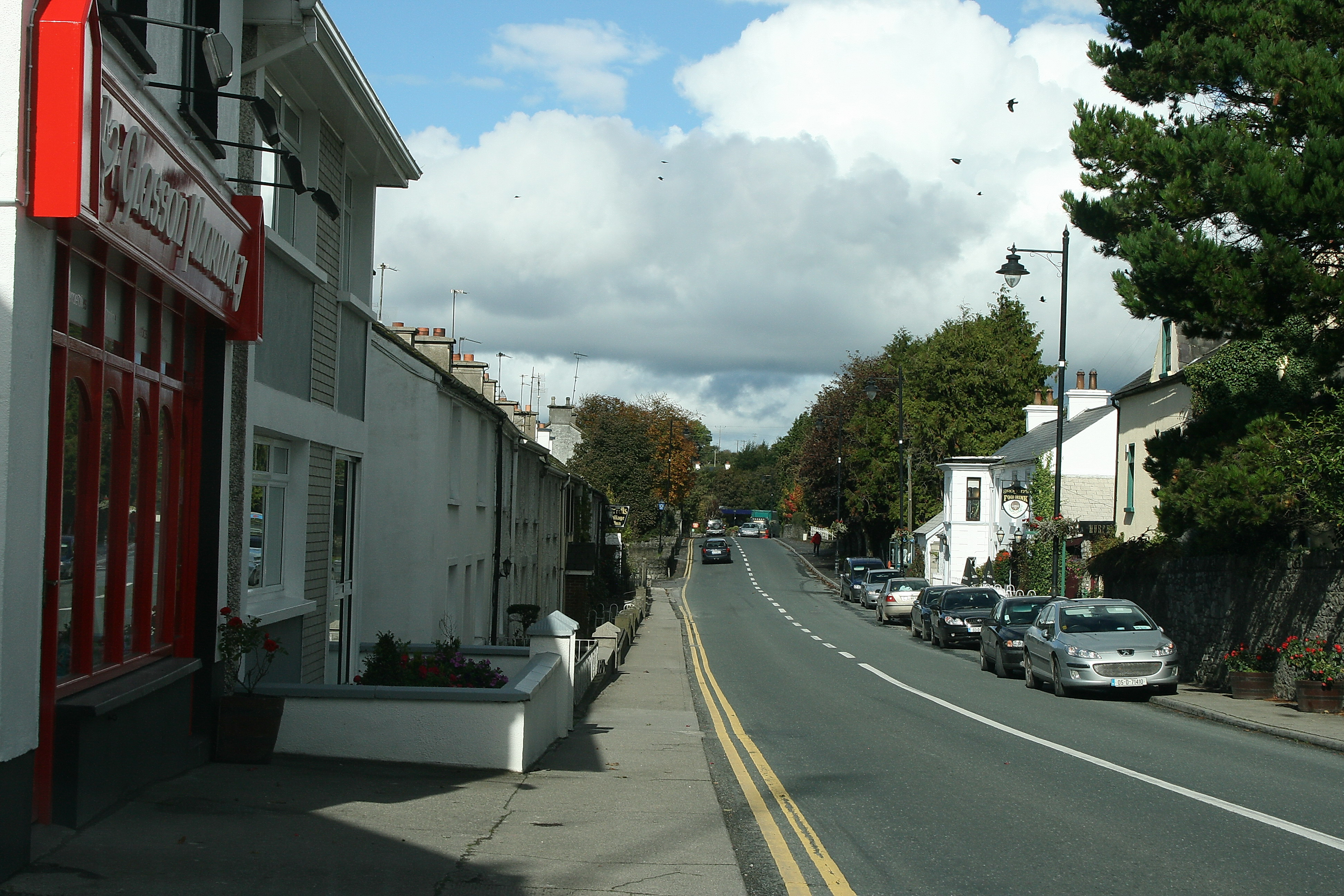
- N55 road through the village

- Location in Ireland
- Coordinates: 53°28′14″N 7°51′50″W
- Country: Ireland
- Province: Leinster
- County: County Westmeath
- Elevation: 56 m (184 ft)

Population (2022)
  - Total: 218
- Irish Grid Reference: N090467

Glassan or Glasson (Irish: Glasán) is a small village in rural County Westmeath, Ireland. It is 10 km (6.2 mi) north of Athlone, on the N55 national secondary road, not far from the shores of Lough Ree. As of the 2022 census, Glassan had a population of 218.

== History and layout ==
The village, sometimes known as "the village of the roses", was established and laid out to serve Waterstown House, the remnants of which is located on a hill south east of the village. The Harris-Temple family lived in Waterstown House which was built in the 1740s. The village was laid out as a straight street without a central square or common. At the south end the school was built to educate the children of the employees of the big house. This school was built for Isabella Harris who believed that education was one of the elements which could prevent the repetition of the distress experienced during the Great Famine of the 1840s.

The core of the village consists of a late 18th/early 19th century terrace of two-storey rose-covered houses. Modern residential developments took place on all approaches to the village in the late 20th and early 21st centuries.

A small river, the River Tullaghan, flows through the northern end of the village and then flows south to Killinure Lough, a part of Lough Ree. The village is overlooked by Caraun Hill.

Close to the village, in an area which was originally the deer park of the Waterstown demesne, is Wine Port - so named because wine was brought from France and Spain by boat and landed here, and brought to the cellars under the house by cart.

== Amenities ==
Services and businesses in the village include two pubs, both with restaurants, a restaurant in the old Garda barracks, a hairdresser, Garda station, automotive sales and repair garages, a heritage/community centre (in the old school house), service station and supermarket, a number of B&Bs, a concrete works, a stonemason's workshop, a defunct petty sessions court house, a former Royal Irish Constabulary barracks, a dispensary operated by the Health Board.

Glassan also hosts two fox hunts; namely the Glassan Farmers Hunt and the South Westmeath Harriers.

== Waterston House ==
The village of Glasson was built to service Waterston House, home of the Temple-Harris family. It is one of a number of Irish villages which were built to service an estate, or 'Big House'. Other examples include Celbridge (associated with Castletown House), Westport (Westport House) and Durrow (Durrow Castle).

All that remains of Waterston House is a corner of two of the original facades, the remains of the house basement, the farmyard, the walled garden, a pigeon loft and some minor structures. What is lost is the rest of the house, the decorative terraced gardens, the castle on an island on the lake, the canals, woods, and shipyards.

== See also ==
- List of towns and villages in Ireland
