= Coosan =

Coosan Cuasán
- Townland
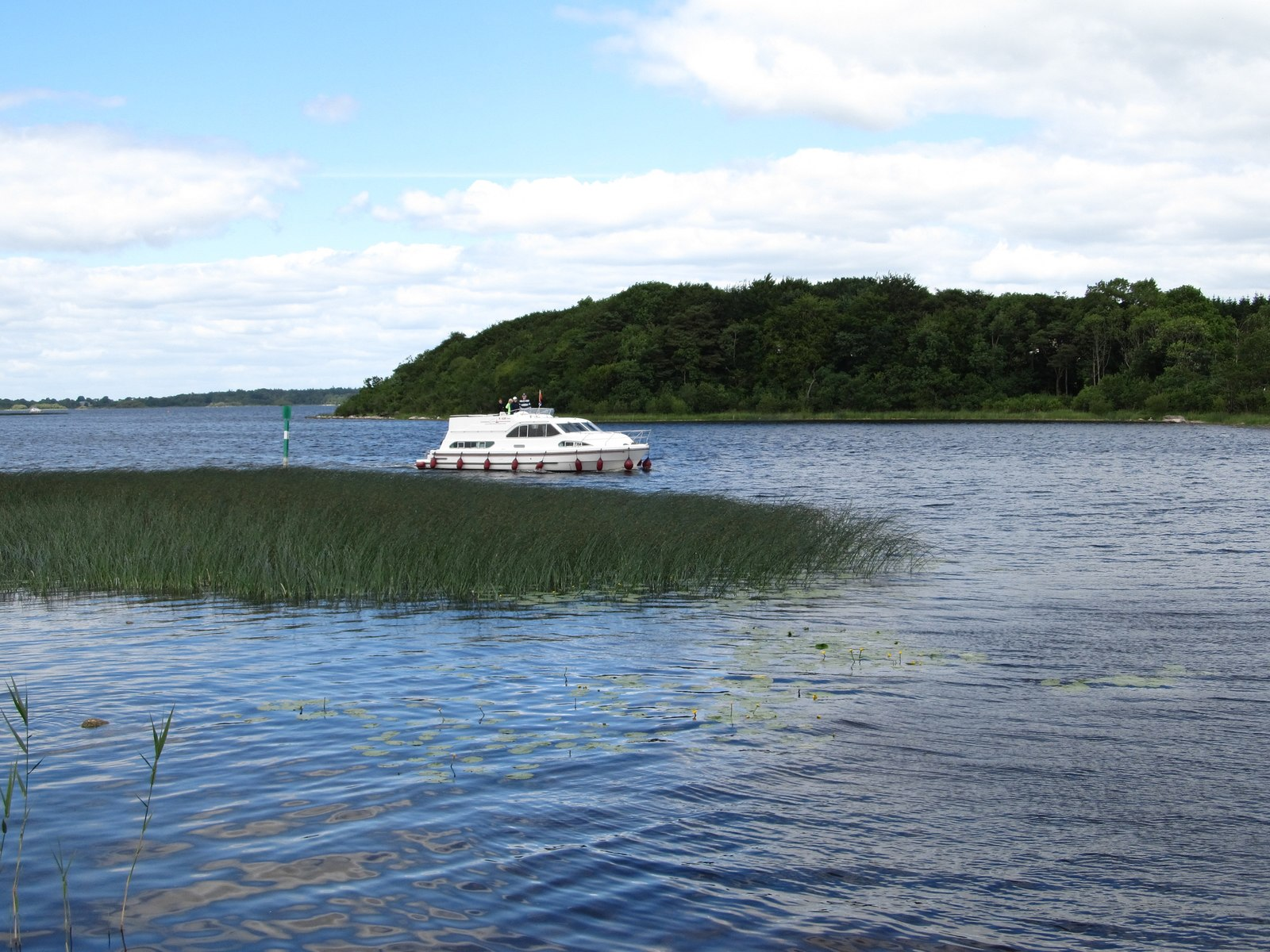
- View of Lough Ree from Coosan Point

- Location within Ireland
- Coordinates: 53.4463°N 7.9348°W
- Country: Ireland
- County: County Westmeath
- Barony: Brawny
- Civil parish: St Mary's

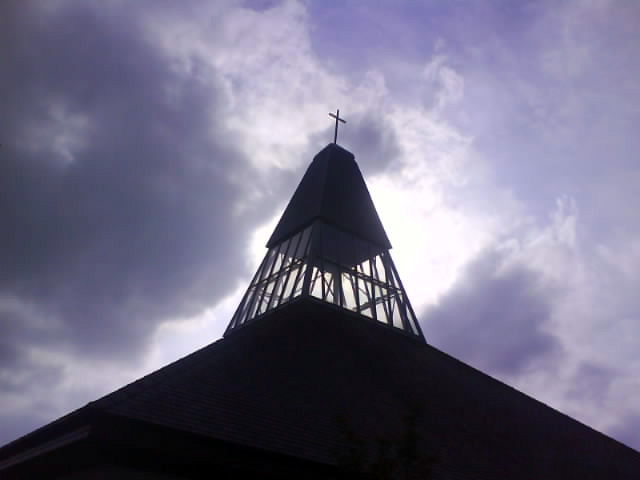
Spire of Our Lady Queen of Peace church in Coosan

Coosan (Irish: Cuasán, meaning 'cavern" or "grotto') is a townland and suburb north of Athlone, County Westmeath in Ireland. Coosan, which is situated on the shores of Lough Ree, is surrounded by water on three sides and bordered by Athlone on the fourth.

Coosan attracts tourists over the summer months due to its location on the edge of Lough Ree. Coosan Lough, one of the "inner lakes" of Lough Ree, is a common fishing spot. The Lough Ree Yacht Club is located in the area.

The area includes a number of townlands, several of which are described 'quarters'. These include Castlequarter, Hillquarter and Meehanquarter.

The local Roman Catholic parish church, Queen of Peace church, was opened in 1973.

== Notable people ==
- Ray Connellan, Gaelic footballer and Australian rules footballer
- Dessie Dolan, Gaelic footballer
- Lisa Dwan, actress
- Robbie Henshaw, International rugby player
- Alan Sheehan, football player
