= Lough Ree =

Lake in the midlands of Ireland, on the Shannon

- Loch Rí (Irish)
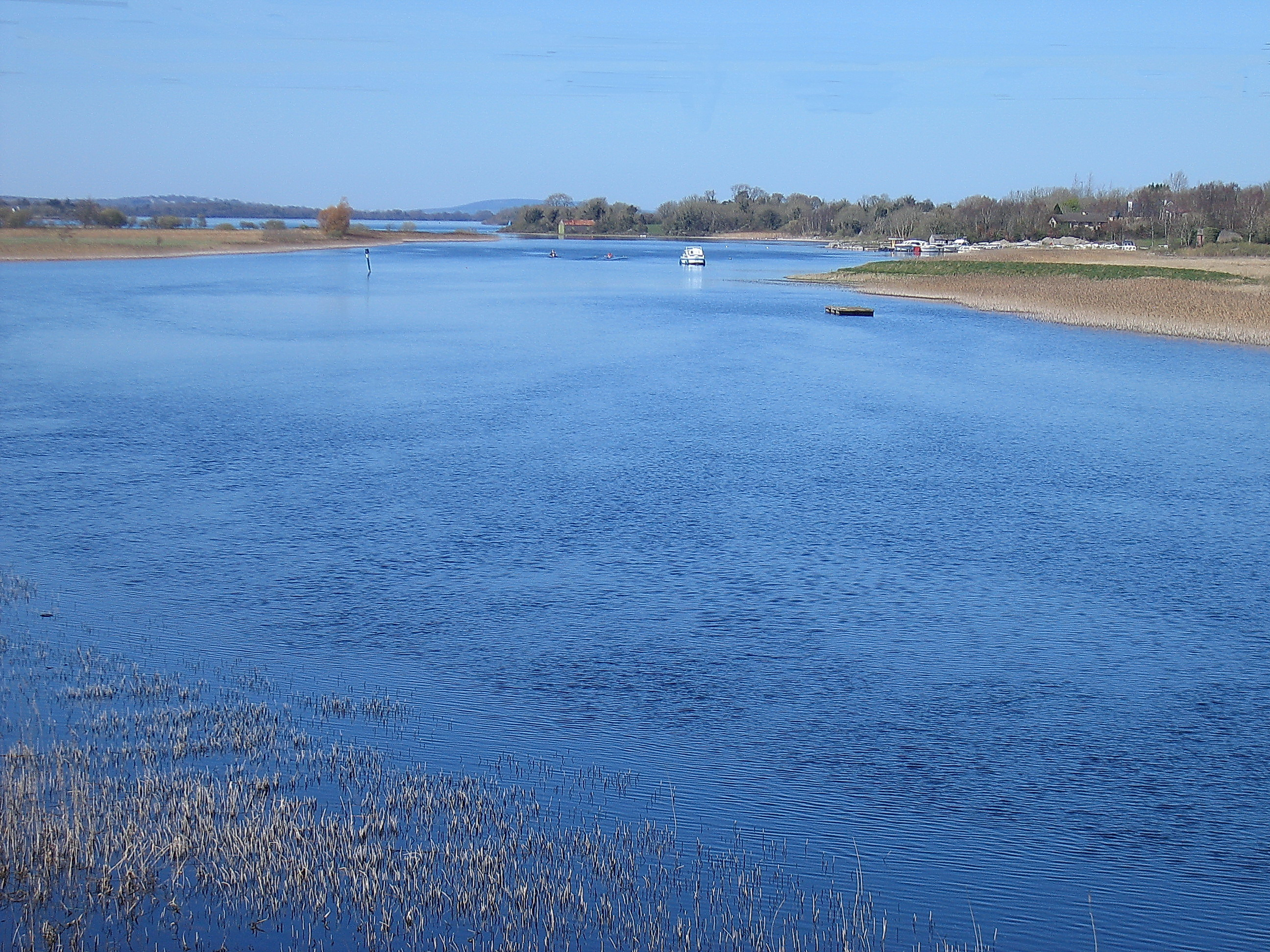

- Location of Lough Ree in Ireland
- Location: Ireland
- Coordinates: 53°30′N 7°58′W
- Primary inflows: River Shannon, River Inny
- Primary outflows: River Shannon
- Basin countries: Ireland
- Surface area: 105 km^{2} (41 sq mi)
- Surface elevation: 38 m (125 ft)
- Islands: Inchcleraun, Inchbofin, Inchmore, Inchturk, Rinanny Island, Clawinch, Inchenagh
- Settlements: Athlone, Roscommon, Ballyleague, Lanesborough, Newtowncashel, Ballykeeran, Glasson, Tang, Keenagh, Ballymahon

Lough Ree (Irish: Loch Rí), translated to English as King's Lake or King Lake,is a lake in the midlands of Ireland, the second of the three major lakes on the River Shannon. Lough Ree is the second largest lake on the Shannon after Lough Derg. The other two major lakes are Lough Allen to the north, and Lough Derg to the south. There are also several minor lakes along the length of the river. The lake serves as a border between the counties of Longford and Westmeath (both in the province of Leinster) on the eastern side and County Roscommon in the province of Connacht on the western side. The lake is popular for fishing and boating. The lake supports a small commercial eel fishery and is locally famous for its eels on wheels truck. The town of Athlone is situated at the southern end of the lake, and has a harbour for boats going out on the lake. The small town of Lanesboro is at the northern end of the lake.

The island of Inchcleraun (Inis Cloithreann) in the northern part of the lake is the site of a monastery founded in the early Christian era and contains the remains of several ancient churches. In Irish legends, it was on this island that Queen Maeve was killed. The Viking Turgesius controlled a ringfort on the shores until his death by drowning in Lough Owel.

Families lived on some of the islands in Lough Ree including Inchcleraun (Walsh & Farrell), The Black Islands (Hanly & O'Hara), Inchmore (Tiernan, Quigley, Nolan & Keefe), Hare Island (Duffy), Inchbofin (Connell), Inch Turk (Ganly, Slevin & Walsh) and Inchenagh (Shea, Killian & Connaughton) until the 1950s, when they were rehoused ashore. Like several other Irish loughs, Lough Ree has been the scene of claimed sightings of a lake monster over the years.

The geographical centre of Ireland was previously calculated to be in the townland of Carnagh East, County Roscommon on the western shore of Lough Ree, opposite the Cribby Islands Also Hodson pillar which is located on an island on the lake is said to be the most central point in Ireland. However, in 2022 Ordnance Survey Ireland did a new calculation which put the centre near Castletown Geoghegan in County Westmeath.

== Ecology ==
Lough Ree has been designated a Special Area of Conservation. The main habitat, by area, is the lake itself, but there are other habitats including bog.

Lough Ree site has been designated a Special Protection Area on the basis of its migratory waterfowl, with nationally important numbers of Tachybaptus ruficollis. It is also an Important Bird Area.

In 2021, invasive quagga mussels were discovered in the lake and in Lough Derg by a research team from UCD.

== Events ==
Jim O'Connor was the first person to solo swim the length of Lough Ree in 2012. The 33.91 km (21.07 mi) swim lasted 13 hours and 34 minutes, a mean speed of 2.5 kilometres per hour (1.6 mph; 0.69 m/s). O'Connor completed this swim to raise funds for South Westmeath Hospice.

== Human history ==
9th century Viking attacks climaxed in 845 in Ireland and they built a fortified base on Lough Ree.

=== Annalistic references ===
From the Annals of Inisfallen:

- AI907.1 Kl. The plundering of Lough Rí by the men of Mumu as far as Mairg Laigen and Mag Léna, as a result of which Mael Craíbe son of Cathalán, king of Cenél Fiachrach, and many others were slain.
- AI922.2 Tomrair son of Elgi, a Jarl of the foreigners, on Luimnech (the Lower Shannon), and he proceeded and plundered Inis Celtra and Muicinis, and burned Cluain Moccu Nóis; and he went on Loch Rí and plundered all its islands, and he ravaged Mide.

From the Annals of the Four Masters:

- M934.6.Amhlaibh Ceannchairech, with the foreigners, came from Loch Eirne across Breifne to Loch Ribh. On the night of Great Christmas they reached the Sinainn, and they remained seven months there; and Magh-Aei was spoiled and plundered by them.

From the Annals of Inisfallen

- AI988.2 A fleet, viz. 300 boats, [was put] on Loch Rí by Brian, and they harried Mide and went to Uisnech. And twenty five boats of these went into Connachta, and a great slaughter of their crews was inflicted there, including Dúnlang, king of Raithlenn, Niall Ua hEirc, Dúngalach Ua Loingsig, and many others. And by them was slain Muirgius son of Conchobar, royal heir of Connachta.
- AI993.2 A naval raid by Brian, and he reached Breifne from Loch Rí by way of Áth Liac northwards.
- AI1016.3 A great hosting by Brian's son to Loch Rí, and he plundered Inis Clothrann (Inchcleraun) and Inis Bó Finne (Inchbofin), brought away the boats of Mael Sechnaill and Leth Cuinn, and took the hostages of Mumu from Cnámhchaill westwards.

=== In popular culture ===
The lake is the subject of the 1973 song "Where The 3 Counties Meet" by Brendan Shine.

== See also ==
- Killinure Point
- List of loughs in Ireland
- Lough Ree Power Station
- Portrun
