= Dean Crowe Theatre =

Dean Crowe Theatre & Arts Centre
- Interactive map of Dean Crowe Theatre & Arts Centre
- Address: Chapel Street, Athlone, County Westmeath, N37 VF29; Ireland
- Coordinates: 53.4217°N 7.9439°W
- Capacity: 466 people
- Type: Theatre and arts space

Website
- www.deancrowetheatre.com

The Dean Crowe Theatre & Arts Centre is a theatre and arts space in Athlone, County Westmeath, Ireland.

== History ==
The theatre is located in a building that was previously used a church. Built between 1795 and 1809, it served as St. Peter's parish church until the 1930s. In 1937, when the present day Church of SS. Peter and Paul was completed, the building was converted to use as a parochial hall. The altar was placed against the wall in the middle of the building, with seating on three sides, and galleries added overhead.

In 1959, the hall was renovated by a local builder and was re-named to "The Dean Crowe Memorial Hall" - in memory of a former pastor of St. Peter's parish who had died several years previously. The renovated building was used as a theatre venue and centre for the arts.

During the 1990s, the Dean Crowe Theatre was refurbished to "create a modern theatre". This work, which was undertaken in phases, was completed in 2002. Additional renovations were also undertaken between 2017 and 2019.

== Modern activities ==
The theatre received grant funding in 2017 and 2024.

The RTÉ All-Ireland Drama Festival takes place in the theatre each May. Amateur drama groups from across the island are chosen from a long-list to present a production in the venue, and the best production is awarded the grand prize.

Athlone's Musical Society, produces a stage musical annually in the theatre. Athlone Film Club has regular screening in the theatre. A schools' "Féile" (traditional musical festival) was staged in March 2024.
