= Athlone Little Theatre =

Coordinates: 53.42347°N 7.93162°W

- Interactive map of Athlone Little Theatre
- Address: St Mary’s Place; Athlone, County Westmeath; Ireland
- Capacity: 100 people
- Type: Theatre

Construction
- Opened: 1936

Website
- www.athlonelittletheatre.ie

The Athlone Little Theatre is a theatre and performance space in Athlone, County Westmeath, Ireland.

== History ==
The Little Theatre was founded in 1936 by Capt Michael Cosgrove of the Army Signal Corps who placed an ad in the local newspaper for interested parties to meet at the Bon-Bon restaurant. At the meeting, and as the only member at the time with experience of acting and production of plays, Cosgrove was elected producer of the newly formed society. All-Ireland Drama Festival director Colm Kelly was associated with the theatre, on stage and behind the scenes, for more than 40 years.

Athlone Little Theatre is one of the oldest theatre companies in Ireland.

== Modern activities ==
The theatre continues to create original productions of existing works. Musical events and Christmas Pantomimes are also staged there.
