= Seoige (surname) =

Seoige (Irish pronunciation: [ˈʃoːɟə]) is an Irish surname that may refer to

- Gráinne Seoige (born 1973), Irish journalist and news anchor
- Marcus Seoige (born 1976), Irish actor
- Síle Seoige (born 1979), Irish television presenter
