= Baysports =

Water park in Ireland

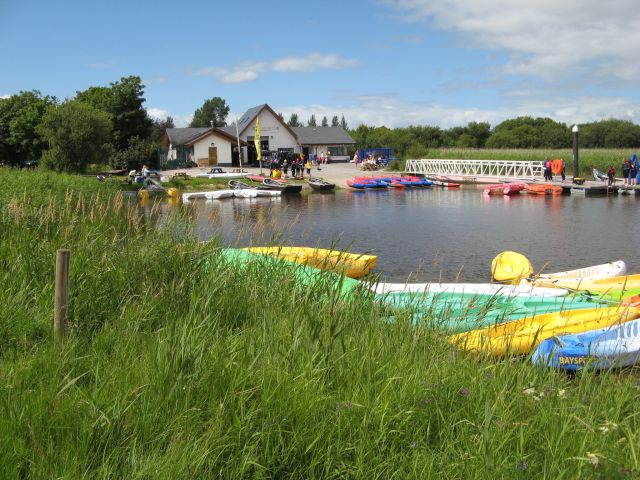
- Baysports slipway
- Interactive map of Baysports
- Location: Hodson Bay, Athlone, Kiltoom, County Roscommon, Ireland
- Coordinates: 53.469454°N 7.986906°W
- Owner: Richard O'Hara
- Opened: 22 June 2009
- Status: Operating
- Area: 1,400 square metres (15,000 sq ft)
- Website: baysports.ie

Location of Baysports in Ireland

Baysports is an outdoor watersports centre located on the outskirts of Athlone at Hodson Bay on the west shore of Lough Ree. It is home to Ireland's largest inflatable water park and adjoins the Hodson Bay Hotel. Opened in June 2009, it holds the Guinness World Record for the tallest floating waterslide in the world.

== History ==
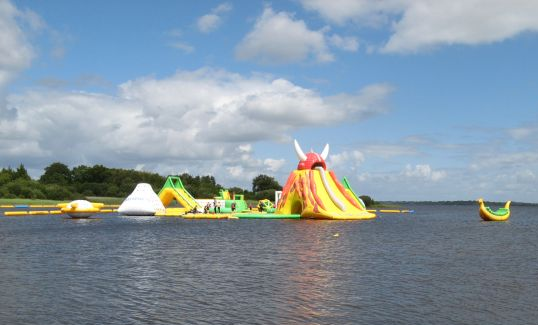
Inflatables

Baysports was opened on 22 June 2009 by Fianna Fáil TD, Mary O'Rourke. Launched as part of Ireland's Hidden Heartlands, the state-of-the art €1.5 million boat training and watersports centre aimed to exploit the tourism potential of what backers described as one of Ireland's finest natural amenities in Lough Ree. Roscommon County Council provided Baysports in conjunction with Fáilte Ireland under the National Development Plan 2000–2006.

On 18 June 2016, Guinness World Records announced that Baysports had achieved the world record for the tallest floating waterslide measuring 6.52 metres (21.4 ft) from the ground to the top of the slide, and 12.54 metres (41.1 ft) to the top of the entire structure.

== Activities ==
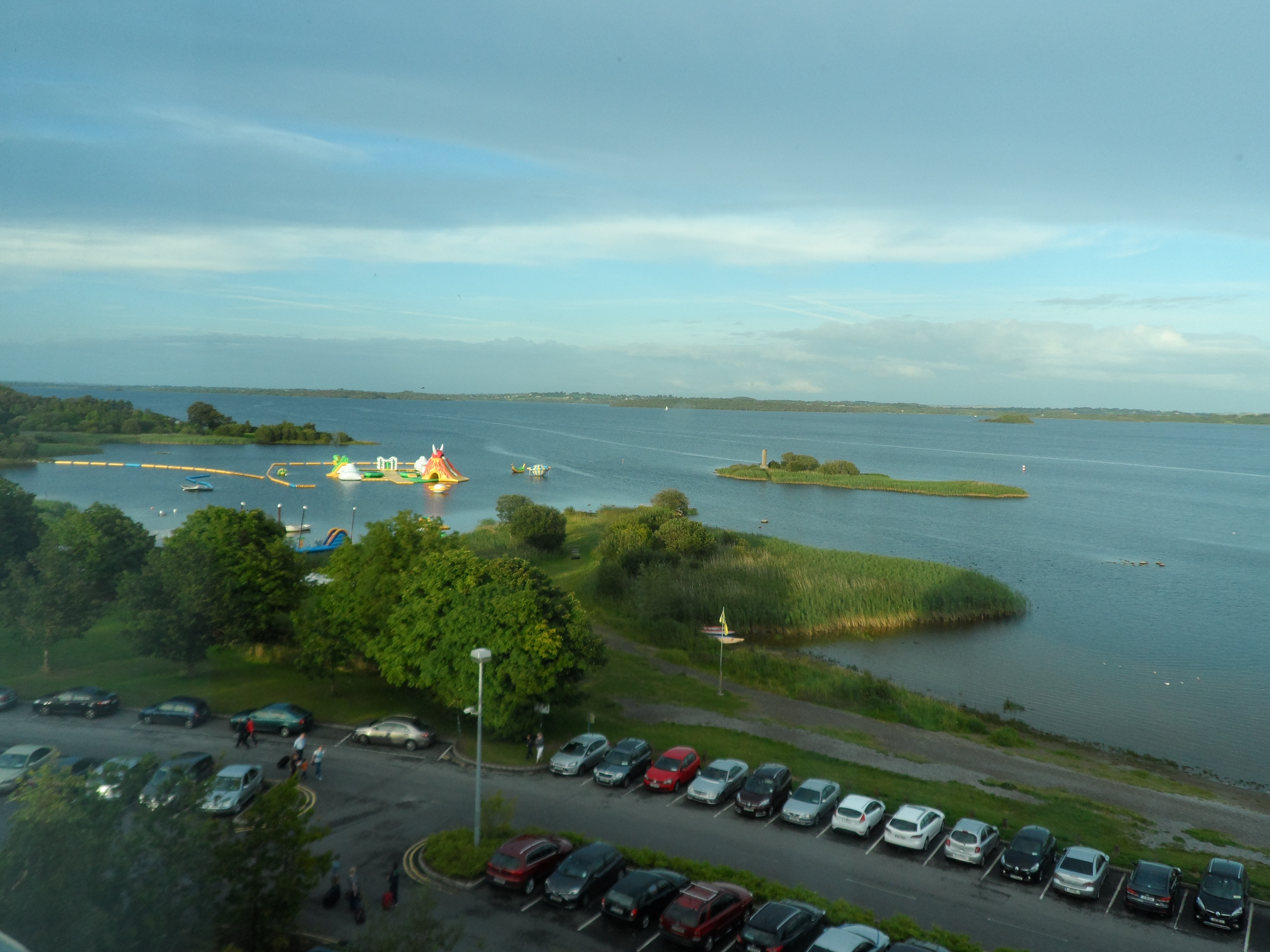
Overview

Baysports offers certified boat training, adventure sports and watersports activities to all ages on the award-winning floating slides, rockers and climbing challenges, with kayaking, powerboating, boat racing, sailing and rafting also offered. There is also a junior water park near the shore to accommodate families with younger kids.

== Awards ==
Publication	Year	World record	R. Status	Ref.
Guinness World Records	2016	Tallest floating slide	Record	
