= Dean John Crowe =

Right reverend Dean John Crowe, V.G. (died 24 May 1955) was an Irish Catholic priest based in Athlone, County Roscommon. He served as Dean of Elphin. He led the project to construct the Church of Saints Peter and Paul, Athlone in the 1950's. The Dean Crowe Theatre, formerly the St. Peter's parish church, was named in his honour in 1959. He also supported the launch of the Irish Catholic comic book The Leprechaun in the 1950's.

== Early life ==
Crowe was born in Galway and attended Summerhill College, in Sligo, and St Patrick's College, Maynooth.

== Construction of Ss. Peter's and Paul's Church ==
As Canon of St. Peter's Church, A friend of Count John McCormack, Crowe was unable to persuade him to attend a 1923 fundraiser. He made international visits to investigate fundraising opportunities to build the new church. He instituted a lottery, "Athlone Sweep" despite the monopoly held by the Irish Hospitals' Sweepstake. Future Taoiseach John A. Costello led the prosecution against the sweepstake, coming to trial in 1924. By his death in 1955, the church was debt-free.
