= Golden Island Shopping Centre =

Retail facility on the edge of Athlone, Ireland

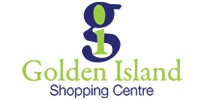

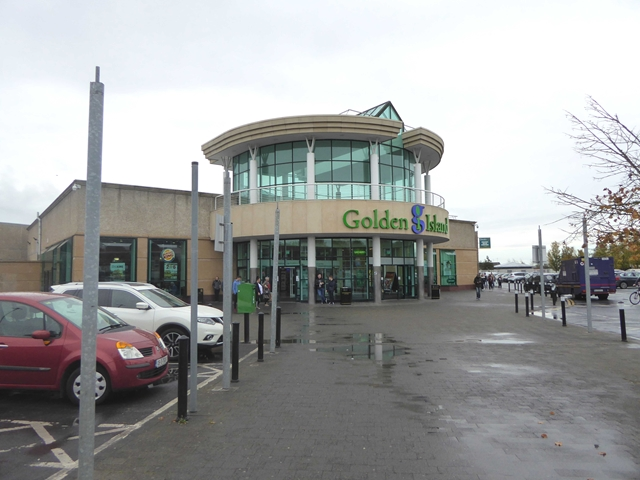
- The centre in 2018
- Location: Athlone, Ireland
- Coordinates: 53°25′12″N 7°55′58″W
- Address: Kilmaine, Athlone, County Westmeath, Ireland
- Opened: October 1997; 29 years ago
- Developer: Owen O'Callaghan; Michael Tiernan; Tom Diskin
- Owner: Tesco (2005–2016); Credit Suisse (2016–2019); Lanthorn (2019-present)
- Num. of stores: 45
- Floor area: 14,306 square metres (153,990 sq ft)
- Parking: 1,000 spaces
- Website: goldenislandshoppingcentre.ie

Golden Island Shopping Centre is a shopping centre located in Athlone, County Westmeath, Ireland.

== History ==
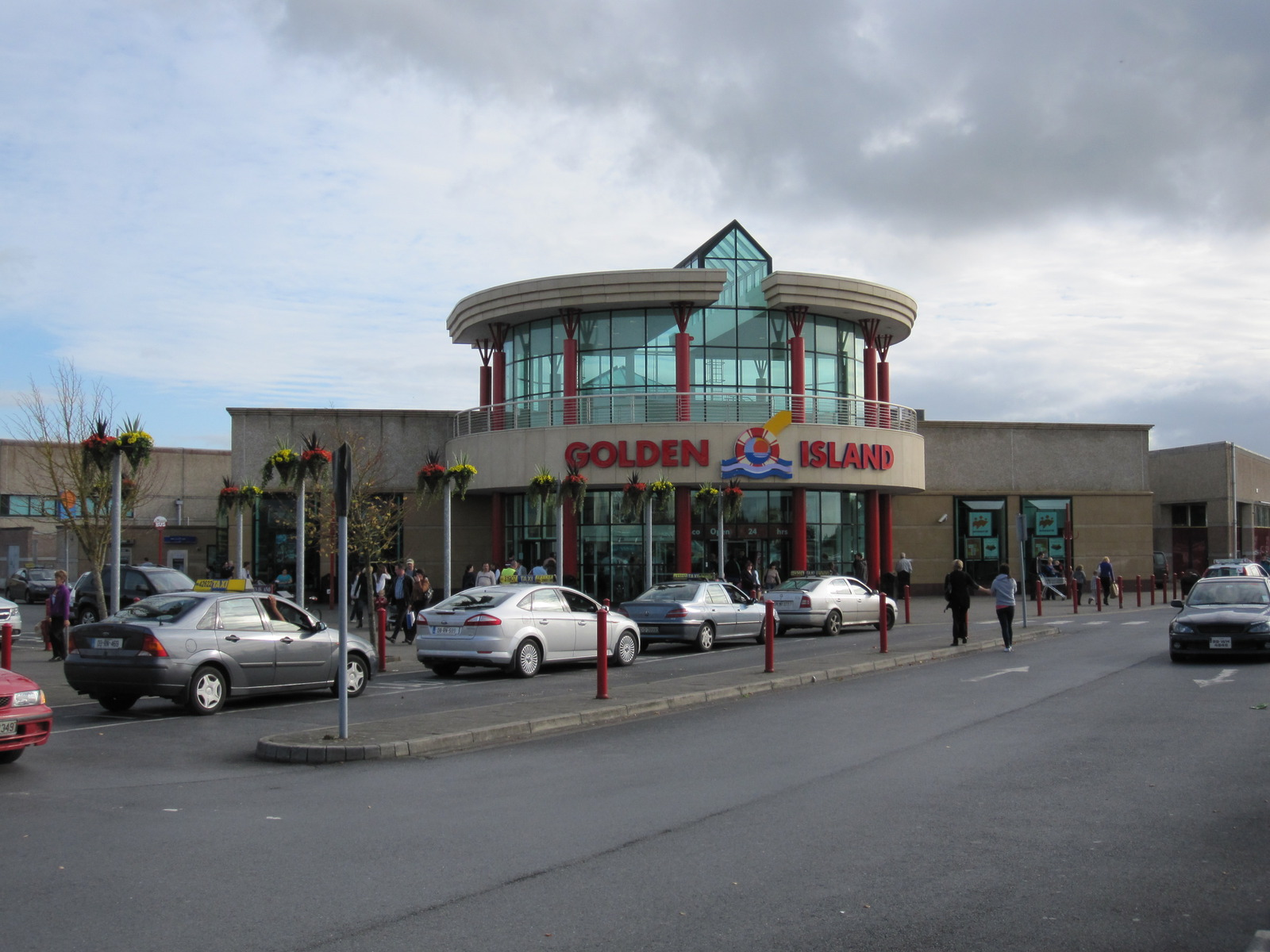
The centre in 2009, prior to rebranding in 2016

The centre, which is situated in the townland of Goldenisland (Kilmaine), was developed, on the site of a former landfill, by Owen O'Callaghan, Michael Tiernan and Tom Diskin. With the aim of attracting more business to the Midland Region of Ireland, the centre opened in October 1997, and has gained a footfall of 65,000 a week.

The shopping centre was sold to Tesco for €52 million in 2005, and it was registered on 24 February 2005.

Tesco stated in June 2015 that it was considering selling the centre, and the building was purchased by Credit Suisse on 23 March 2016 for €43.4 million.

On 1 May 2019, Credit Suisse put the centre on sale for €41 million. It was purchased by a fund managed by Davy Real Estate in late 2019.

As of 2024 the infamous islands of Golden Island have been removed.

== Retail units ==
The centre contains 45 units, including clothing retailers (such as Penney's and Diesel), health shops, mobile phone providers, cosmetic shops (such as Boots), jewelry shops and restaurants and cafés (such as Costa Coffee and Burger King) There is plans to add another restaurant unit, beside the cinema, in the future. The anchor unit at the eastern end of the centre is a large Tesco supermarket, selling food and clothes. The Tesco unit was originally intended to be a Quinnsworth supermarket, but Quinnsworth was acquired by Tesco shortly prior to the shopping centre opening.

== Cinema ==
The shopping centre also contains an IMC cinema, which opened in 1998 with six screens and a capacity of 871 seats. There have been plans put in place to add 4 new screens and to renovate the cinema but this has yet to commence development. This cinema replaced the former, four-screen, Showcase Cinema, which was located above the old Athlone Shopping Centre in Irishtown, and which opened in May 1992 and closed in early 1998, when the operator of the Showcase Cinema went into partnership with the IMC to open the cinema in the Golden Island shopping centre. Prior to that, there had been no cinema in Athlone following the closure of the Ritz Cinema located beside the Shannon bridge in 1985 and the closure in the late 1970s of the Adelphi Cinema located in Garden Vale.
