= Athlone =

Town in counties Roscommon and Westmeath, Ireland

Athlone Baile Átha Luain (Irish)
- Town
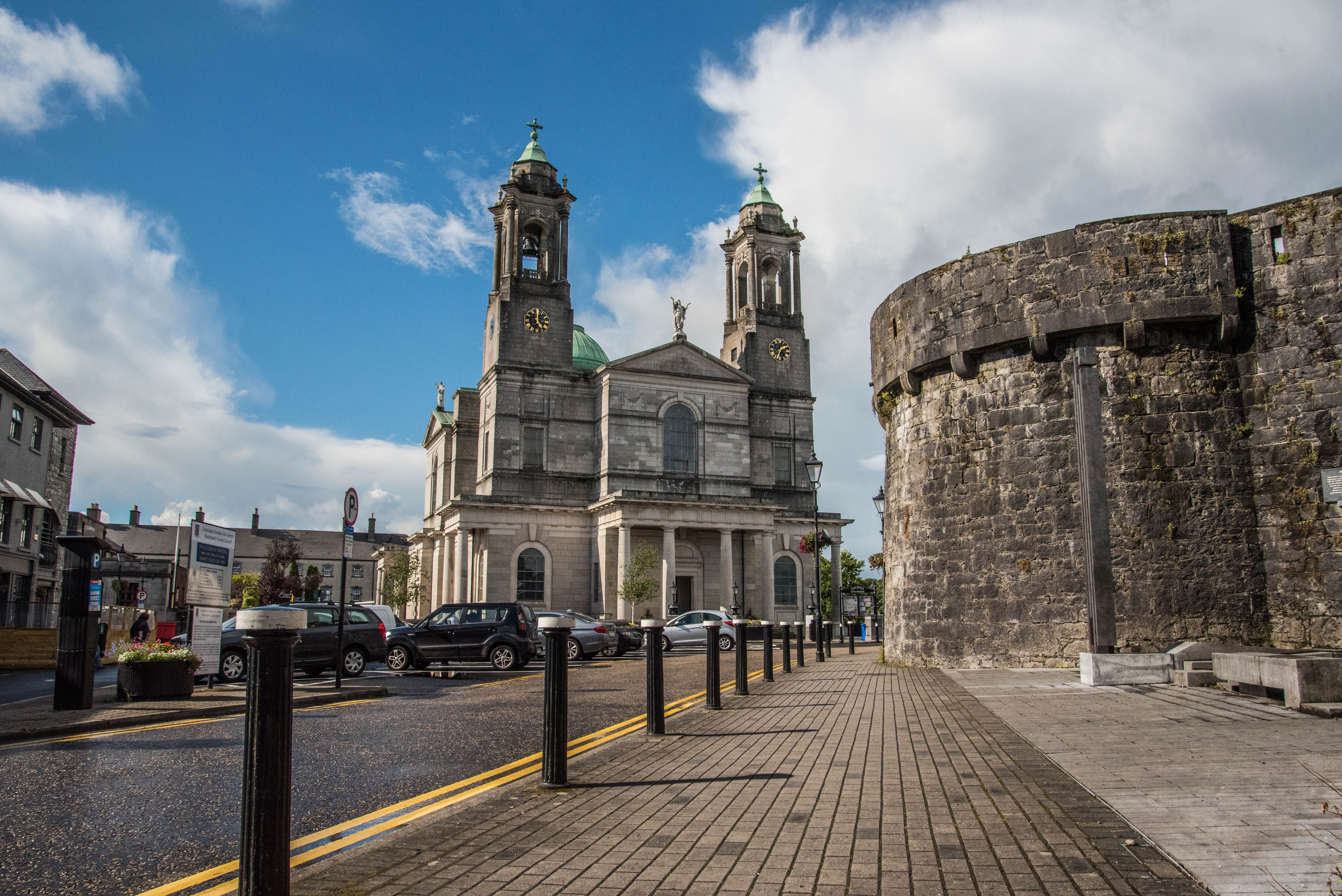
- From centre: the Church of Saints Peter and Paul sits on the bank of the River Shannon; Athlone Castle

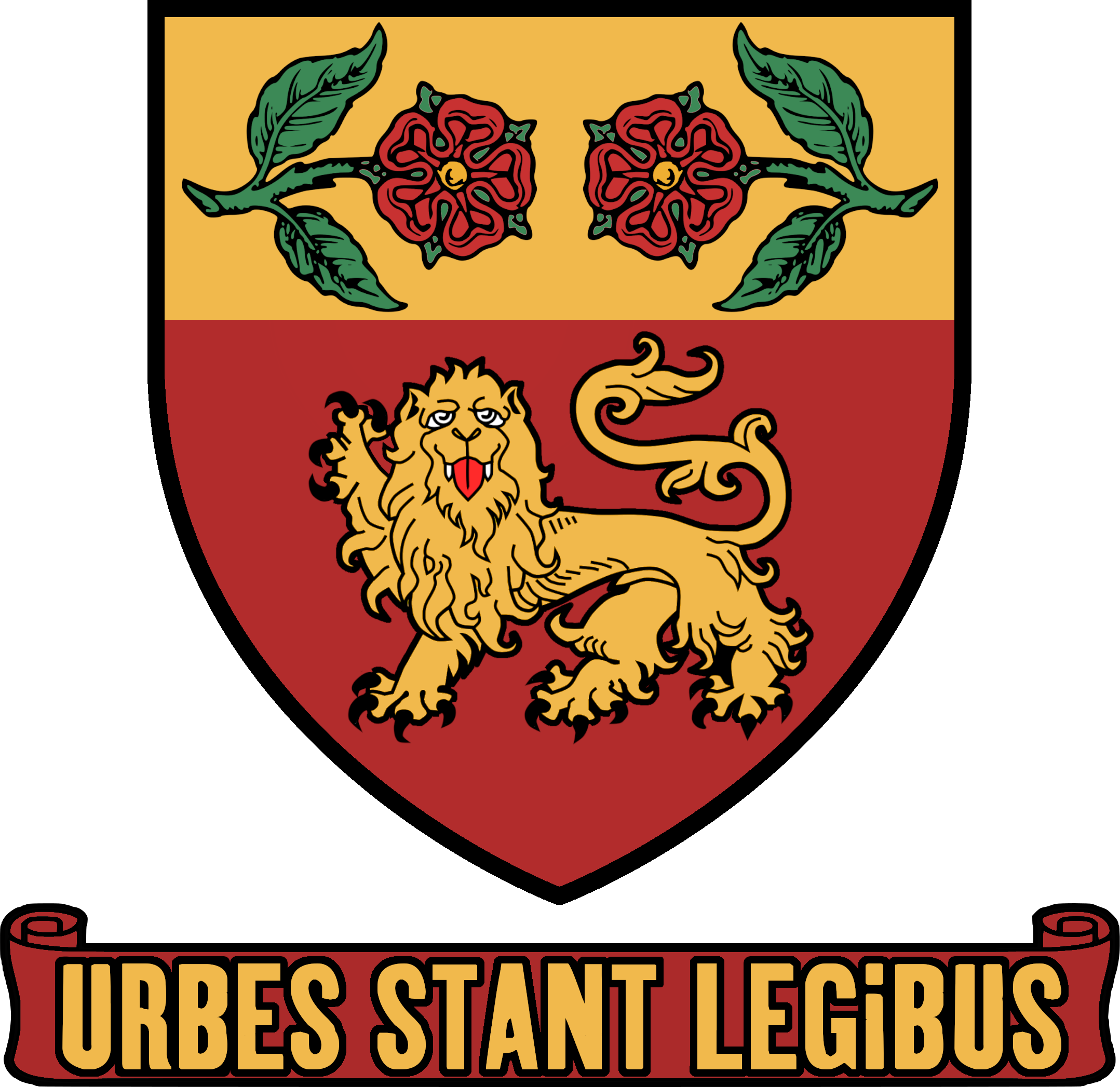
- Coat of arms
- Motto: Latin: Urbes Stant Legibus "A city stands by its laws" (literally "Cities stand by their laws")
- Location in Ireland
- Coordinates: 53°25′25″N 07°56′33″W
- Country: Ireland
- Province: Leinster, Connacht
- County: County Westmeath, County Roscommon

Government
  - Dáil constituency: Longford–Westmeath

Area
  - Total: 10.92 km^{2} (4.22 sq mi)
- Elevation: 56 m (184 ft)

Population (2022)
  - Total: 22,869
  - Density: 2,094/km^{2} (5,424/sq mi)
- Time zone: UTC±0 (WET)
  - Summer (DST): UTC+1 (IST)
- Eircode routing key: N37
- Telephone area code: +353(0)90
- Irish Grid Reference: N033420
- Website: athlone.ie

Athlone (/æθˈloʊn/; Irish: Baile Átha Luain, meaning 'The town of Luan's ford' [ˌbʲlʲɑː ˈl̪ˠuənʲ]) is a town on the border of County Roscommon and County Westmeath, Ireland. It is located on the River Shannon near the southern shore of Lough Ree. It is the second most populous town in the Midlands Region with a population of 22,869 in the 2022 census.

Around 100 km west of Dublin, Athlone is near the geographical centre of Ireland.

== History ==
Historical population
Year	Pop.	±%
1821	7,543	—
1831	11,406	+51.2%
1841	6,393	−44.0%
1851	6,199	−3.0%
1861	5,902	−4.8%
1871	6,565	+11.2%
1881	6,755	+2.9%
1891	6,742	−0.2%
1901	6,617	−1.9%
1911	7,472	+12.9%
1926	7,540	+0.9%
1936	7,257	−3.8%
1946	8,379	+15.5%
1951	9,015	+7.6%
1956	10,369	+15.0%
1961	10,767	+3.8%
1966	10,987	+2.0%
1971	11,611	+5.7%
1981	14,426	+24.2%
1986	15,571	+7.9%
1991	15,358	−1.4%
1996	15,544	+1.2%
2002	15,936	+2.5%
2006	17,544	+10.1%
2011	20,153	+14.9%
2016	21,349	+5.9%
2022	22,869	+7.1%

Athlone Castle, situated on the western bank of the River Shannon, is the geographical and historical centre of Athlone. Throughout its early history, the ford of Athlone was strategically important, as south of Athlone the Shannon is impassable until Clonmacnoise, where the Esker Riada meets the Shannon, while to the north the Shannon flows into Lough Ree. In 1001 Brian Bóru sailed his army up river from Kincora and through Lough Derg to attend a gathering in Athlone. The following year, Brian met the High King of Ireland Máel Sechnaill mac Domnaill at Athlone, intending to engage him in a battle for the High Kingship – only to have Máel Sechnaill, abandoned by his kinsmen of the Northern Uí Néill, submit to Brian without a fight.

A bridge was built across the river in the 12th century, approximately 100 metres (330 ft) south of the current structure. In 1129, to protect the bridge, the High King Turloch Mór Ó Conor constructed a fort on the river's west bank, within Athlone. On a number of occasions both the fort and bridge were subject to attacks, and towards the end of the 12th century the Anglo-Normans constructed a motte-and-bailey fortification there. This earthen fort was followed by a stone structure built in 1210 by Justiciar John de Gray. The 12-sided donjon, or tower, dates from this time; however, the rest of the original castle was largely destroyed during the 1691 Siege of Athlone and subsequently rebuilt and enlarged.

In 1607, Athlone was granted a municipal charter by James I. This entitled it to send two MPs to the Irish House of Commons.

Throughout the wars that wracked Ireland in the 17th century, Athlone contained the vital, main bridge over the River Shannon into Connacht. During the Irish Confederate Wars (1641–53), the town was held by Irish Confederate troops until it was taken in late 1650 by Charles Coote, who attacked the town from the west, having crossed into Connacht at Sligo.

Forty years later, during the pan-European War of the Grand Alliance (1688–97), the town was again of key strategic importance. In the Irish phase of the conflict (the Williamite War in Ireland of 1688–1691), Athlone was one of the Jacobite strongholds that defended the river-crossings into the Jacobite-held Province of Connacht following the Battle of the Boyne on 1 July 1690. That same year, Colonel Richard Grace's Jacobite forces in Athlone repelled an attack by 10,000 men led by Commander Douglas. In the following year's campaign, the Siege of Athlone saw a further assault by a larger allied force, during which the invading troops of King William and Queen Mary eventually overran the entire city. The defenders were forced to flee further west, toward the River Suck, at such speed that eyewitness accounts record that they "flung their cannons into the morass" as they fled. The most recently discovered account of the Siege of Athlone, written after the attack, on 5 July 1691, was found in 2004 in an archive in the Netherlands. The account was penned by the victorious commanding officer from the Republic of the Seven United Netherlands, general lieutenant Godard van Reede, in letters written to his family in mainland Europe. In the account, the commanding allied officer reported that half of Athlone's defenders retreated westward, towards the rest of their army, leaving almost 2,000 dead within the city walls and more than 100 taken prisoner, including dozens of officers.

From 1801, under the Acts of Union 1800, the borough constituency of a constituency was represented by one MP in the House of Commons of the United Kingdom. It was disfranchised in 1885.

In Samuel Lewis's Topographical Dictionary of Ireland, published in 1837, it is described as "a borough, market and post-town, and an important military station, partly in the barony of Brawney, county of Westmeath, and province of Leinster, and partly in the barony of Athlone, county of Roscommon, and province of Connaught".

In the 1970s, Éire Nua, a Sinn Féin programme, proposed making Athlone the capital of a federal United Ireland.

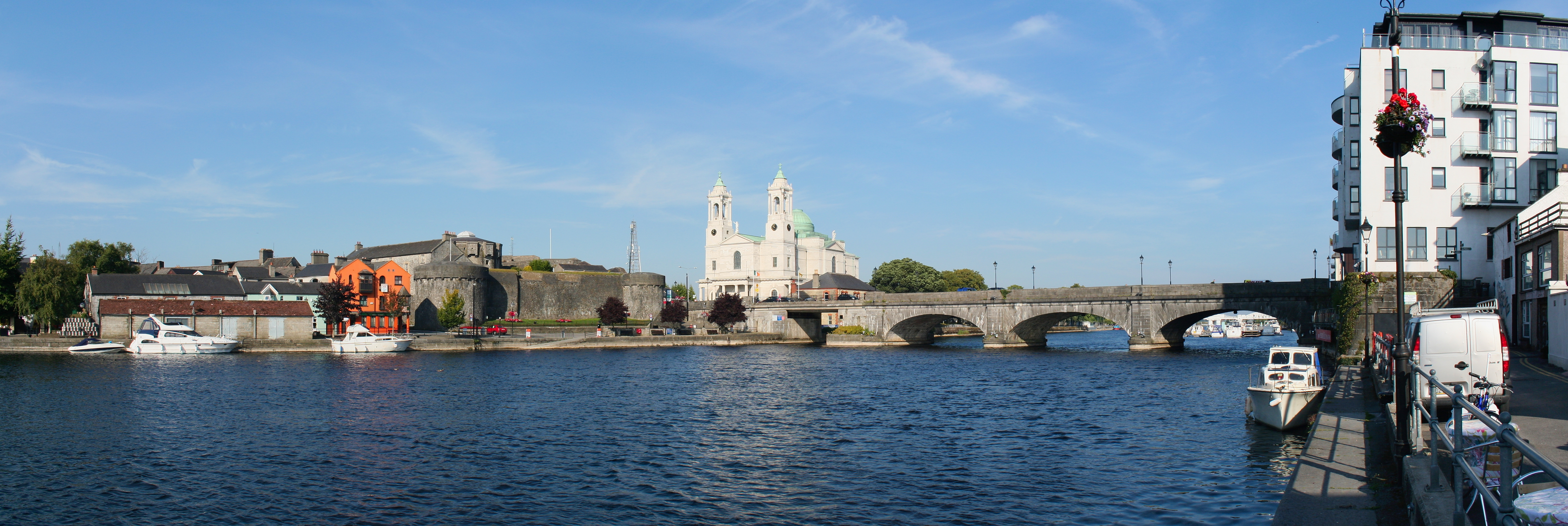
Athlone Castle, Church of Saints Peter and Paul and the River Shannon

== Location and access ==
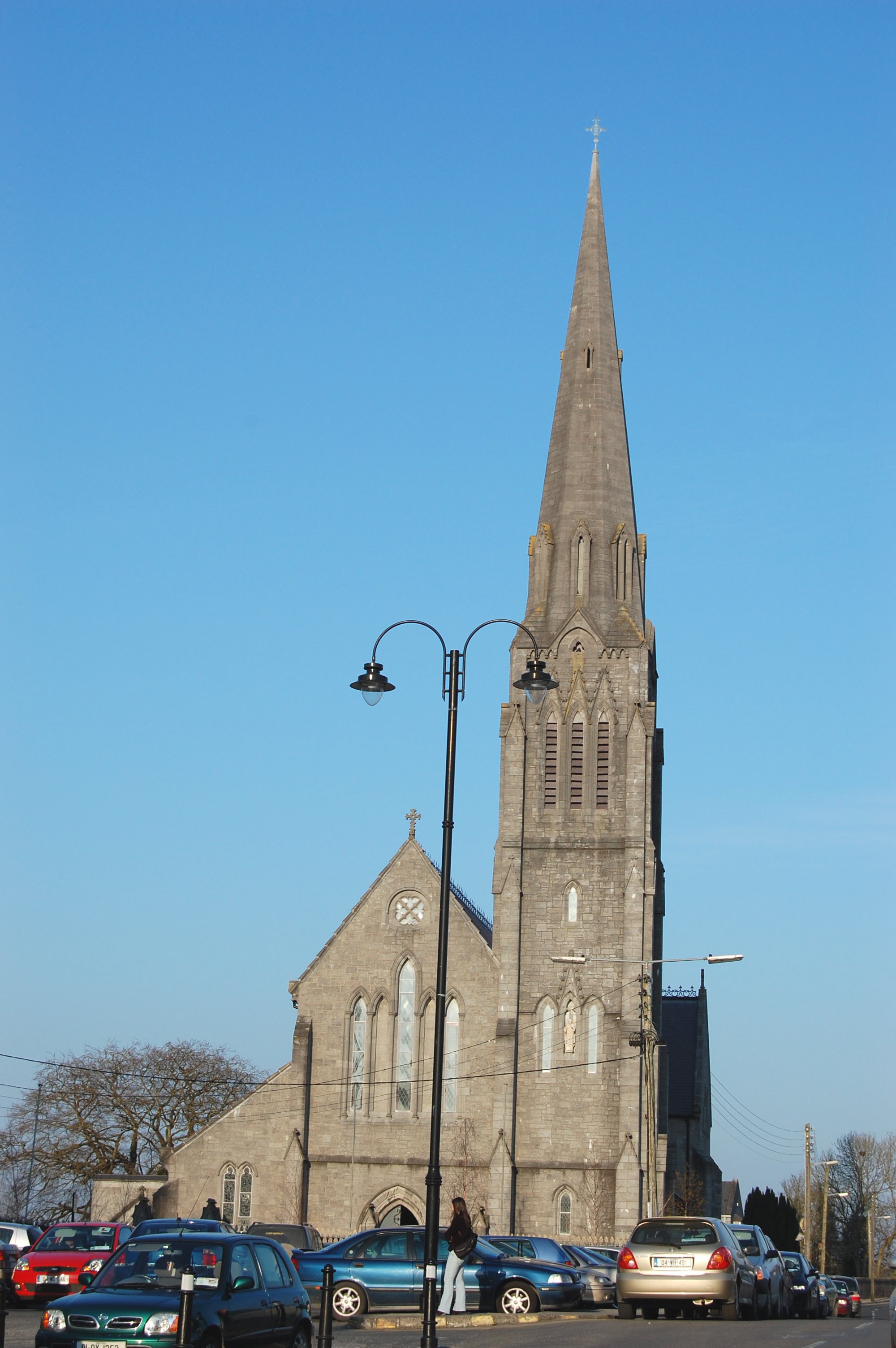
St. Mary's Church (Roman Catholic) in Athlone

Most of the town lies on the east bank of the river, within the townland of the same name; however, by the terms of the Local Government (Ireland) Act 1898, six townlands on the west bank of the Shannon, formerly in County Roscommon, were incorporated into the town, and consequently, into the county of Westmeath.

With the two counties divided by the river, the part of the town that lies east of the Shannon is in the province of Leinster, the county of Westmeath, the barony of Brawny, and the civil parish of St Mary's. Unusually, the barony is coterminous with a single civil parish. In terms of ecclesiastical boundaries, the eastern part of the town is in the Roman Catholic Diocese of Ardagh and Clonmacnoise and the parish of St Mary's. There are several other churches in the town including a Church of Ireland (St. Mary's, Anglican), the Church of Saints Peter and Paul, a Franciscan friary and a chapel of the Society of Saint Pius X.

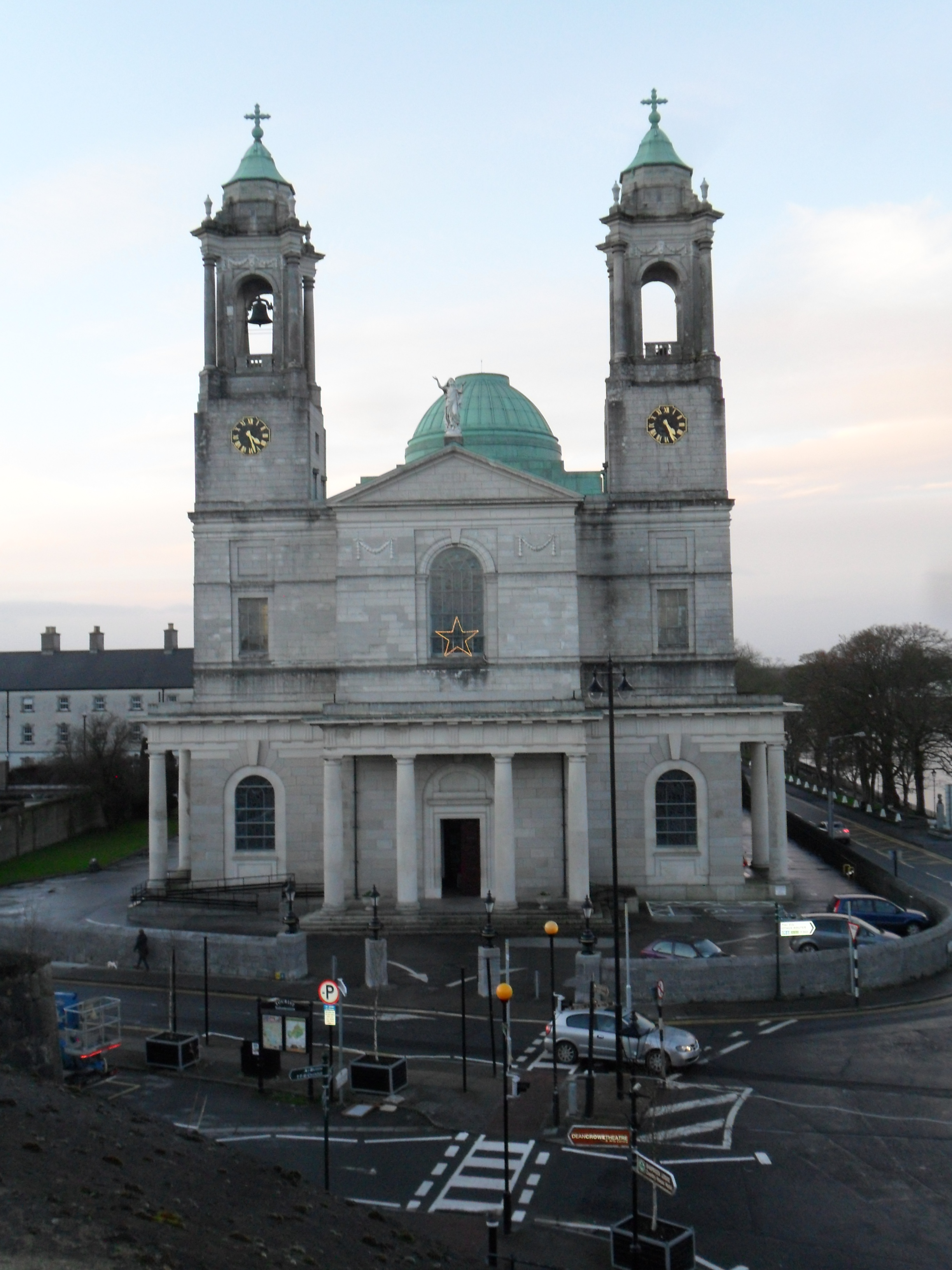
Church of Saints Peter and Paul, Athlone

However, seven townlands, or sections of the town, lie west of the Shannon: Athlone and Big Meadow, Bellaugh, Bogganfin, Canal and Banks, Doovoge, part of Monksland, and Ranelagh. Although surrounded by County Roscommon in the province of Connacht, they are designated as part of County Westmeath to preserve the integrity of the town. These townlands lie in St Peter's civil parish in the barony of Athlone South. In terms of ecclesiastical boundaries, the townlands west of the Shannon are part of the Roman Catholic Diocese of Elphin and the parish of Saints Peter and Paul.

=== River ===
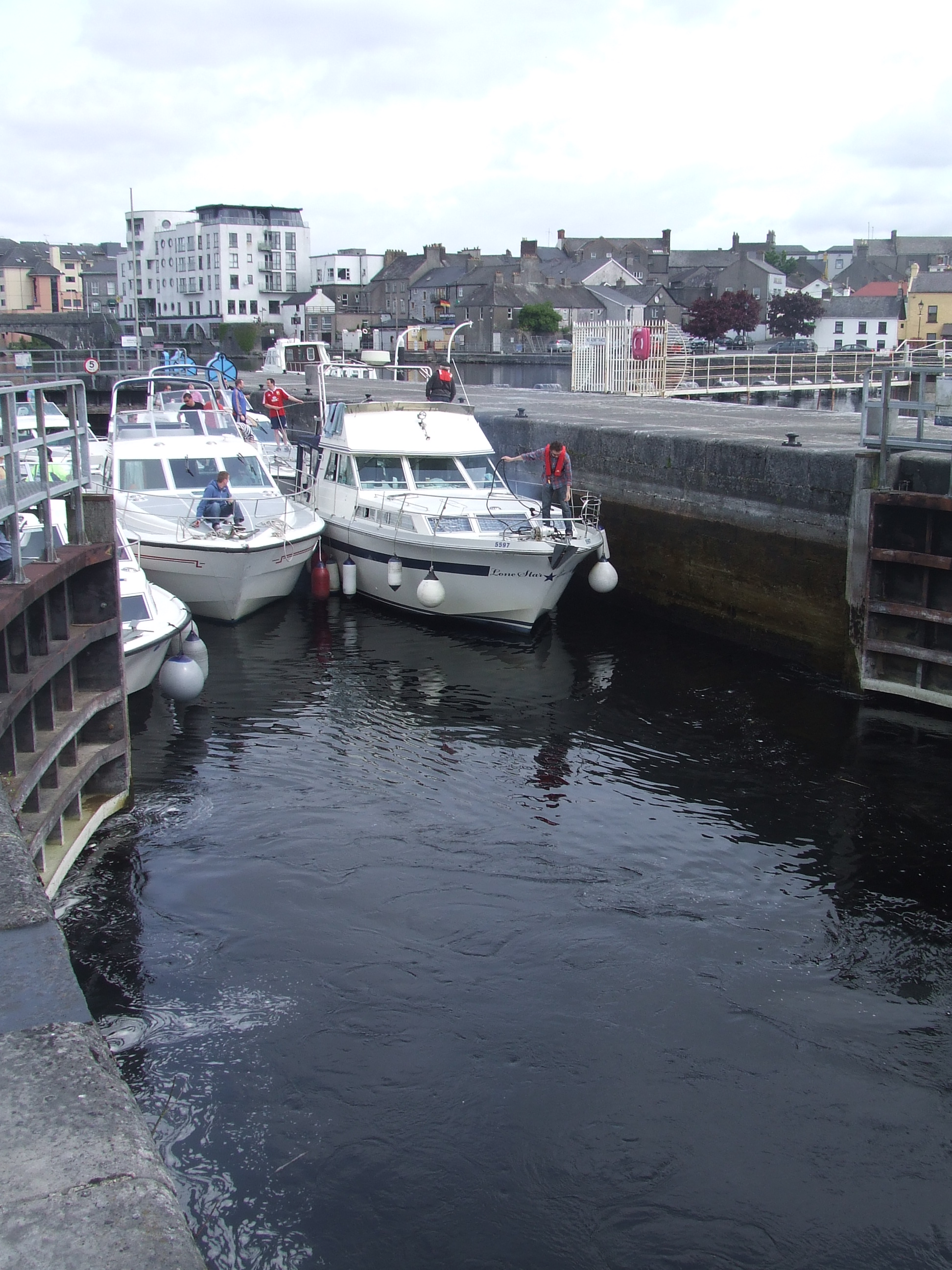
Pleasure cruisers exiting the Athlone canal by the weir on the Shannon. June 2013

Athlone is a common stop for pleasure craft along the River Shannon. Lough Ree, the largest lake on the Shannon, is a short distance upstream from Athlone, and many boat companies are based out of the town.

For craft to pass through Athlone, it is necessary to use a lock in the river, which is beside the weir and downstream of the current road bridge. The lock, weir, and bridge were all constructed by the Shannon Navigation Commissioners in the 1840s. Before then, boats used a canal, about a mile and a half long, to the west of the river. The canal was built by Thomas Omer for the Commissioners of Inland Navigation. Work started in 1757 and involved the work of over 300 men. Omer built a single lock, 120 feet (37 m) x 19 feet (5.8 m) with a rise of 54 inches (1.4 m), but there was also a guard lock, further upstream, with a single set of gates to protect the canal against floods. There were also two lay-bys, or harbours, one above the lock and another at the upstream end. The old canal is no longer navigable.

=== Rail ===
Athlone railway station opened on 3 October 1859, with Irish Rail services travelling eastwards to Portarlington, Kildare and Dublin Heuston and westwards to the Westport/Ballina lines as well as to Athenry, Oranmore and Galway.

Connections from Athlone via a train transfer at Athenry railway station extend to Ennis and Limerick, while a transfer at Portarlington connects Limerick Junction and Limerick. There are trains from Portarlington to Mallow, and from Mallow to Cork, Killarney, Farranfore and Tralee. Travel between Athlone and Killdare enables connections to Carlow, Kilkenny and Waterford.

=== Bus ===
For many years state-owned bus operator Bus Éireann provided hourly services to Dublin and Galway from its bus station in Athlone located beside the railway station, but in July 2021 these routes, 20 and X20 Expressway, were cancelled indefinitely. The company cited "continuing losses [..] resulting from the severe impact of the COVID-19 pandemic" as the reason. Bus Éireann services between Dublin and Belfast, Cork and Limerick were also cut following a "viability review" of 18 routes in September 2020. It was noted that from July 2021 onwards, bus journeys between Athlone and Galway, Ballinasloe, Moate, Dublin city or Dublin Airport would be operated by private companies only, with passengers being dropped off or picked up at the Arcadia Retail Park and Athlone Institute of Technology rather than the bus station. Such private bus companies that stop in Athlone include Citylink and a new Aircoach bus route (Galway-Athlone-Dublin) which was established soon after Bus Éireann's decision, to cope with the demand.

Transport for Ireland (TFI), the national public transport brand managed by the National Transport Authority (NTA), operates a local Athlone bus service in and around the town. The local services include routes A1 and A2, which both serve Golden Island Shopping Centre and the former Athlone Institute of Technology campus. The Athlone Town service became Ireland's first fully electric bus service in January 2023.

There are also services to Cavan, Drogheda, Limerick, Longford, Mullingar, Roscommon and Waterford. TFI Local Link operates a bus service, route 815, to Tullamore.

=== Road ===
The town is located alongside the N6 dual carriageway, which is effectively a section of the M6 motorway connecting Galway to Dublin. The N6 passes along the northern side of the town, crossing the River Shannon into County Roscommon. A number of national secondary roads connect Athlone with other towns and regions, namely the N55 to Ballymahon and Cavan, the N61 to Roscommon and the N62 to Birr, Roscrea, and Southern Ireland.

== Administration ==
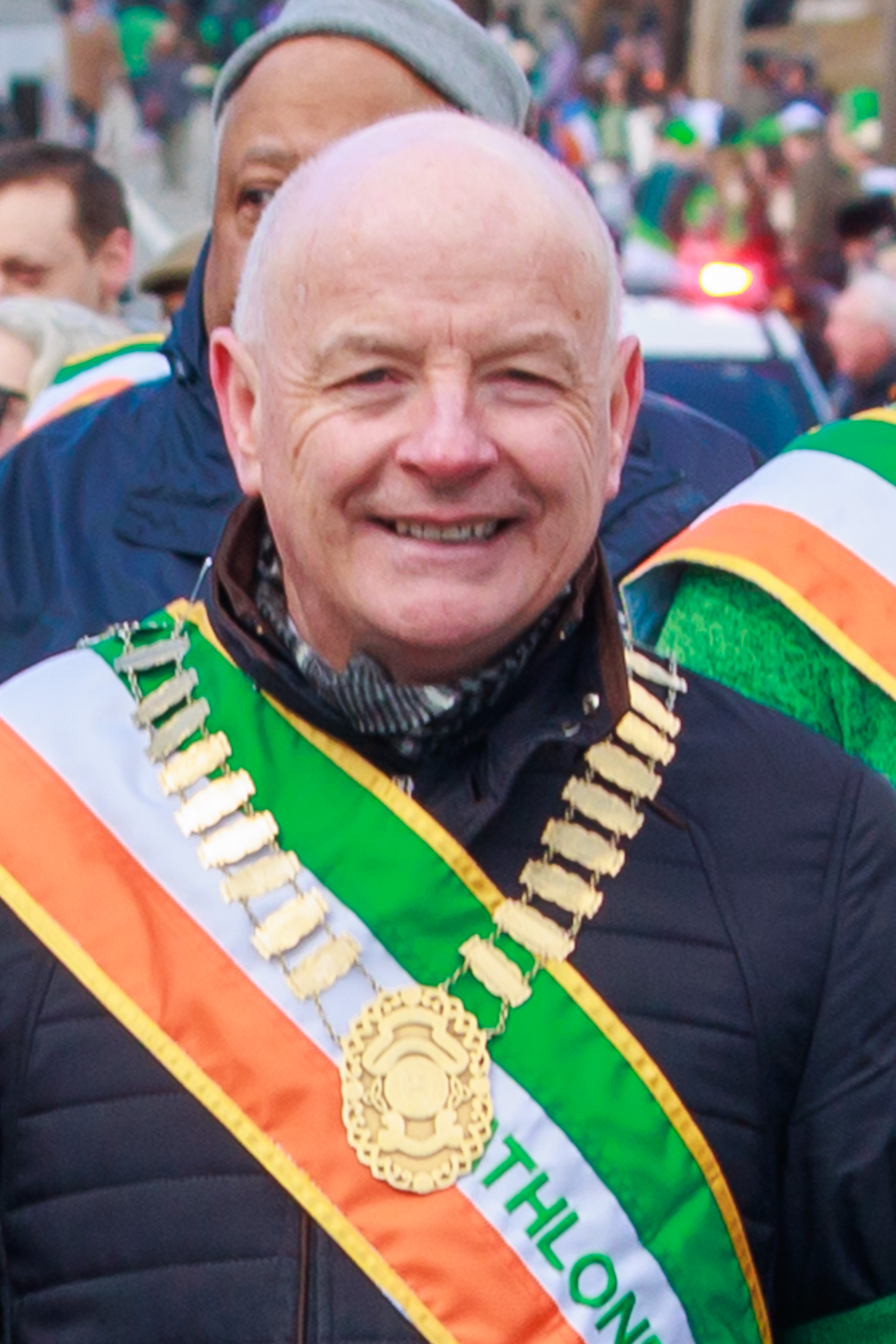
Frankie Keena is a four-time mayor of the Athlone-Moate Municipal District

Athlone was granted a municipal charter by James I in 1607. This created a parliamentary borough with a right to elect two MPs to the Irish House of Commons until 1801. After the Acts of Union 1800, it was represented in the United Kingdom House of Commons by one MP. A commissioners' report dated 1833 stated: "To the prosperity of Athlone the corporation have at no time contributed, nor is it likely that, as at present constituted, they ever will. The strongest feeling of hostility exists between the inhabitants and its members." The municipal corporation was abolished under the Municipal Corporations (Ireland) Act 1840. It was disfranchised by the Redistribution of Seats Act 1885.

Athlone was later granted town commissioners under the Towns Improvement (Ireland) Act 1854. Following the Public Health (Ireland) Act 1878, Athlone was designated as an urban sanitary district. Under the Local Government (Ireland) Act 1898, the town became an urban district and the board of commissioners was upgraded to an urban district council. The portion of the urban sanitary district which had been in County Roscommon was transferred to County Westmeath. In 2002, the urban district council became a town council. In 2003, the area of jurisdiction of the town was enlarged. In 2014, in common with all town councils in Ireland, it was abolished. The urban district council was based at the old civic offices, which had been crudely extended over time and were demolished to make way for the new Athlone Civic Centre, which was completed in 2004.

In County Roscommon, Athlone is a six-seat local electoral area (LEA) to Roscommon County Council which forms its own municipal district. In County Westmeath, Athlone is a five-seat LEA to Westmeath County Council which is part of the municipal district of Athlone—Moate.

=== City status proposals ===
In the 21st century, Athlone (including Monksland) has been proposed for redesignation as a regional city. The creation of the technological university in the town in 2021 prompted renewed calls for city status. In November 2024, an RTÉ Television show, "Future Ireland", examined the possibility of Athlone becoming a city by 2050.

Lobby groups such as Destination Athlone, as well as property developers such as Ballymore Group have made public submissions proposing Athlone as a city. The Ballymore plan, published in June 2025, described Athlone as a potential "15-minute green city", with a population of about 100,000.

As part of a 2026 budget initiative, the Government of the 34th Dáil announced Athlone's inclusion as a regional centre in the "Living City Initiative".

== Culture ==
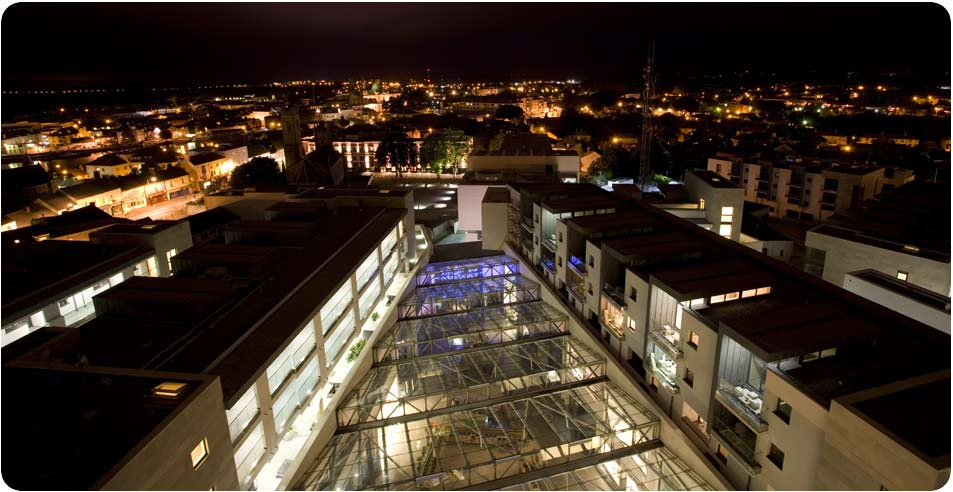
Looking west from the town centre

Theatres in Athlone include the Dean Crowe Theatre & Arts Centre and the Little Theatre.

RTÉ All-Ireland Drama Festival takes place annually in Athlone, bringing together nine amateur drama groups from across Ireland. The festival is supported by a number of "fringe" events that include street theatre, art exhibitions, workshops and activities for young people.

A cultural and history festival focused on the town's connection to the Shannon, the Athlone River Festival, was held in 2019, and again from 2024-2026.

The Athlone Literary Festival is an annual event which began in 1999, originally as a weekend celebration of the life and works of John Broderick, but which was later expanded to feature a variety of speakers and debaters.

The tenor John McCormack was born in Athlone.

Athlone School of Music opened in 2013 and is a grant-aided project aimed at developing music education and services in the Midlands region.

Abbey Road Artists' Studios launched in 2011 in a building constructed in 1841. These artists' studios, which provide a dedicated space for local and visiting artists, consist of four individual studios as well as a multi-purpose space which is used community cultural events, exhibitions, performances and workshops. The Abbey Road artists' studios work closely with the Luan Art Gallery.

In 1954, Athlone became the first branch of the Inland Waterways Association of Ireland and the town had a large part in the organisation's creation.

== Literature ==
American crime writer James M. Cain refers to Athlone in his 1937 book, Serenade, in a passage where two characters discuss tenor John McCormack: "--There's the language he was born to. John McCormack comes from Dublin". "He does not. He comes from Athlone". "Didn't he live in Dublin?". "No Matter. They speak a fine brogue in Athlone, almost as fine as in Belfast". "It's a fine brogue, but it's not brogue. It's the English language as it was spoken before all the other countries of the world forgot how to speak it. There are two things a singer can't buy, beg or steal, and that no teacher, coach or conductor can give him. One is his voice, the other is the language that was born in his mouth. When McCormack was singing Handel he was singing English, and he sings it as no American and no Englishman will ever sing English".

The Irish poet Aubrey Thomas de Vere wrote a poem The Ballad of Athlone which is an account of an incident in the 1691 siege.

== Amenities ==
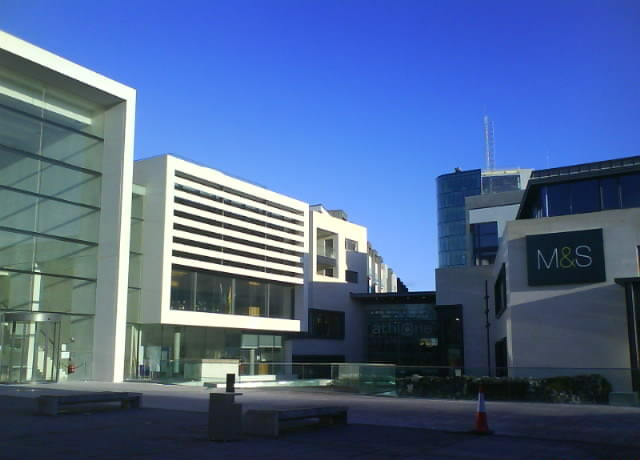
Athlone Town Centre shopping centre.

Athlone is a retail destination within the Midlands region of Ireland. The town centre extends from Church Street in the west to Seán Costello Street in the east. Located centrally is the Athlone Town Centre, a shopping centre built in 2007, containing 54 shops, cafés and a four-star hotel. The Golden Island Shopping Centre, which opened in 1997, is also located in the town centre.

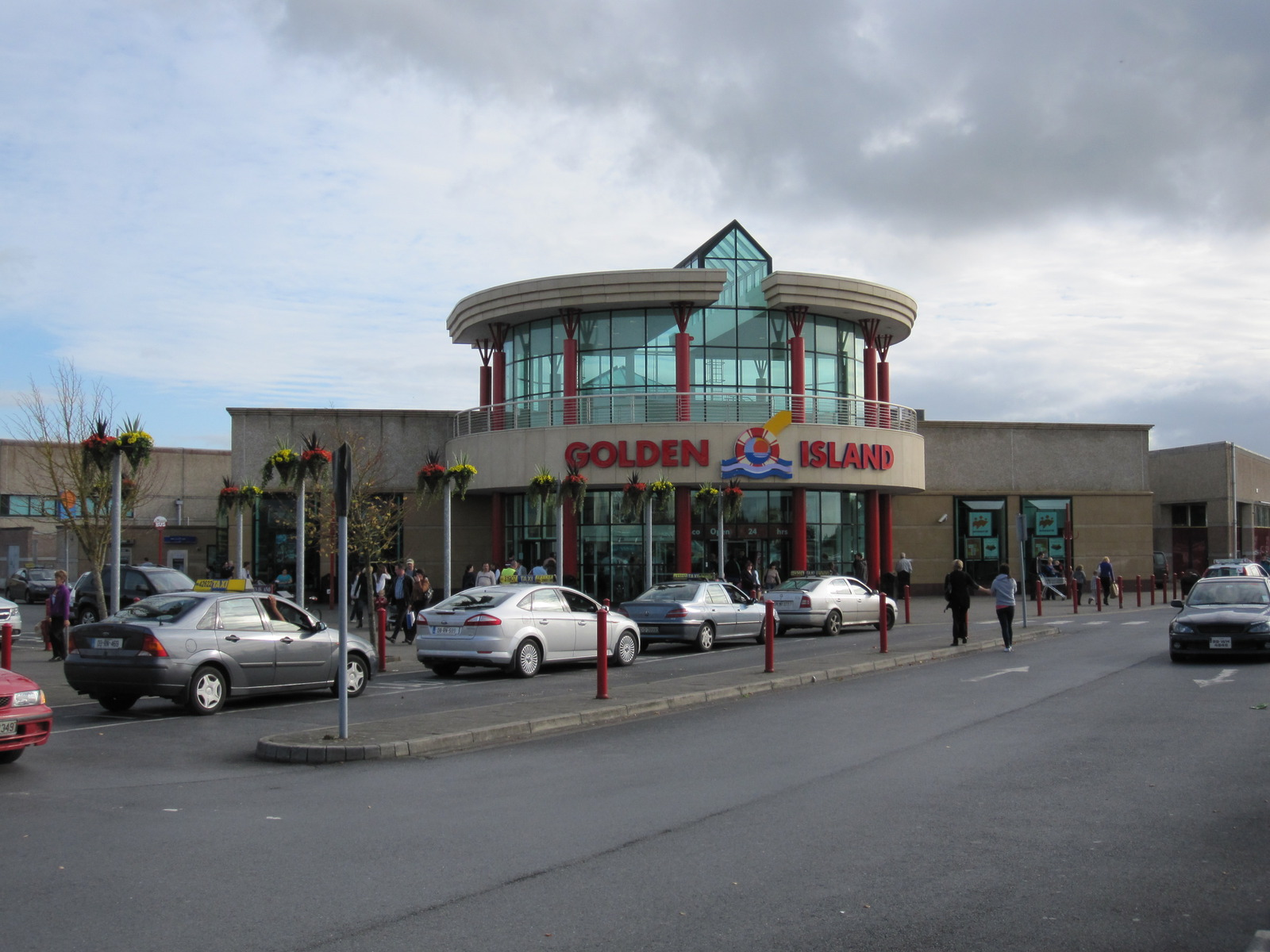
Golden Island Shopping Centre, opened 1997

Athlone Regional Sports Centre, developed by the former Town Council in 2002, is located on the outskirts of the town. The facility contains a swimming pool, gym and AstroTurf pitches. It is served by TFI bus route (A2).

Athlone has a number of hotels, including chains such the Radisson Blu and Sheraton hotels.

== Places of interest ==
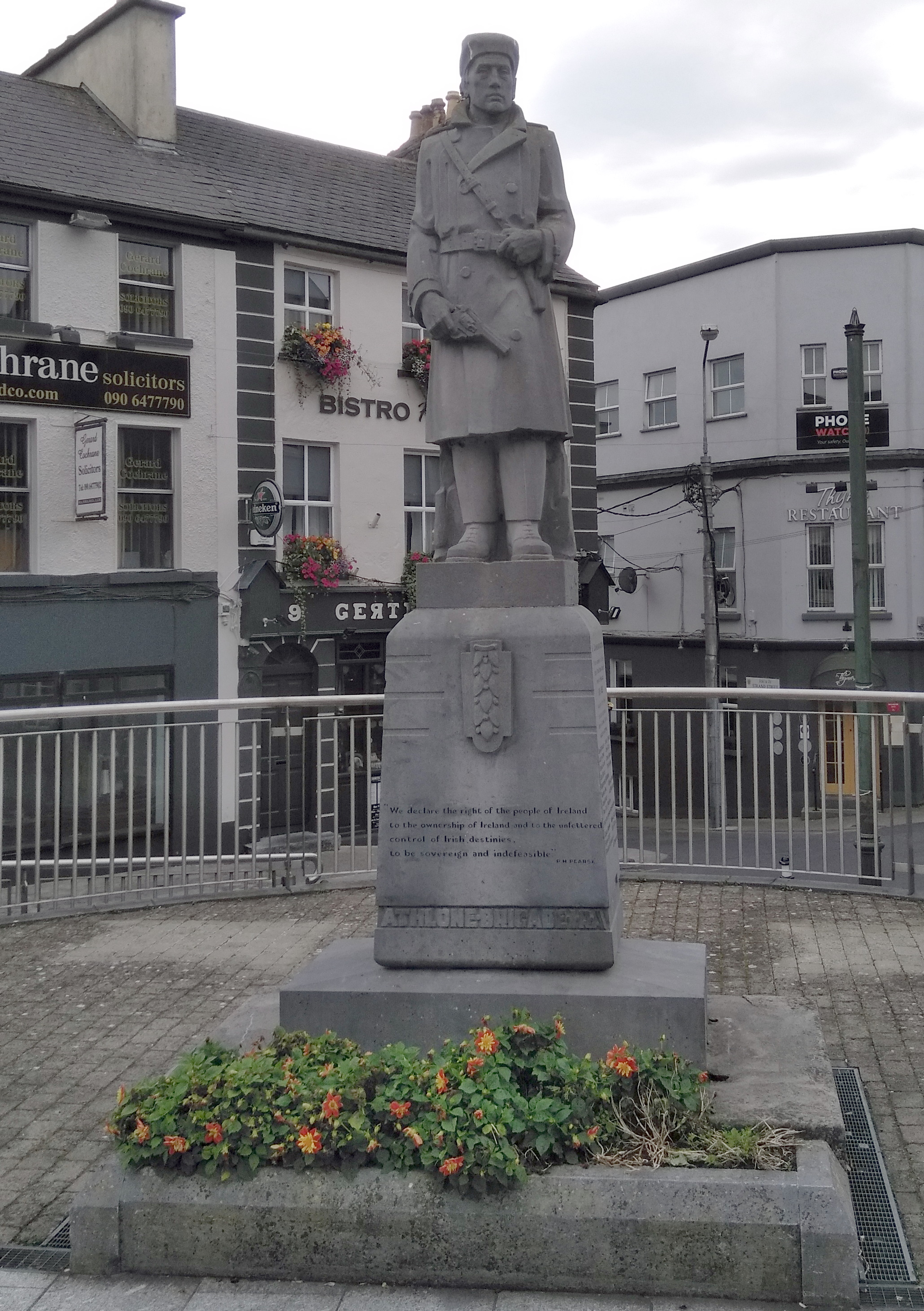
IRA Memorial on Custume Place, Athlone

The promenade on the River Shannon is popular among anglers and participants of water sports. The lakeshore is accessed from Coosan Point and Hodson Bay.

Athlone Castle is open to the public as a museum and there is a tourist office on Church Street. Sean's Bar, located on the west bank of the river, was certified by the Guinness Book of World Records as the oldest pub in Ireland.

The Luan Gallery was opened in 2012. It is the first purpose-built, modern visual art gallery in the Midlands. It was designed by Keith Williams, who also designed the Athlone Civic Centre. The gallery, which was officially opened by Jimmy Deenihan, the Minister for Arts, Heritage and the Gaeltacht, opened with an exhibition of works from the Irish Museum of Modern Art.

Burgess Park stands near the centre of the town, on the banks of the River Shannon. Other nearby tourist attractions include the Glendeer Open Farm and the Viking Cruise of the Shannon. Baysports, a boat training and watersports centre with the world's largest floating inflatable water slide as of 2016, is located on the outskirts of the town at Hodson Bay.

=== Public art ===
Examples of public art and sculpture in Athlone include the IRA Memorial which was erected near the corner of Church Street and Custume Place in the early 1950s. It is dedicated to the Athlone Brigade of the Irish Republican Army (IRA) that participated in the Irish War of Independence (1919–1921) and Irish Civil War (1922–1923). The limestone statue consists of a life-sized male figure, dressed in a typical IRA uniform from the period, and was created by Dublin-based sculptor Desmond Broe.

Also on Custume Place is a sculpture, the "Mask of the Shannon", which was erected in 2020 - despite some controversy about the choice of figure used to personify the River Shannon. A figurative statue, representing the "contributions the Marist Brothers have made to the town of Athlone", was unveiled on St. Mary's Square in 2012.

=== Greenway ===
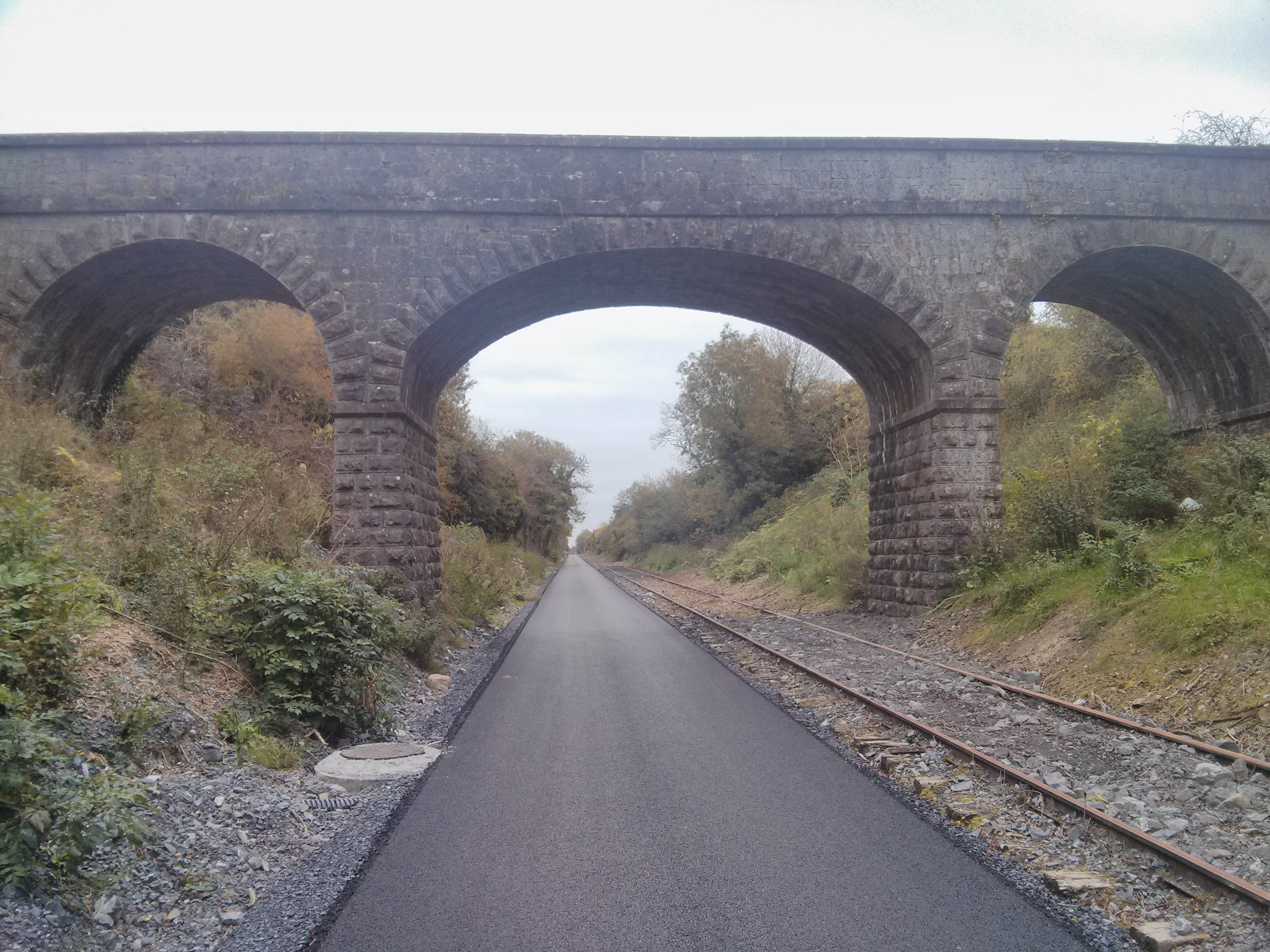
Bridge on the greenway

The Old Rail Trail greenway runs for 42 kilometres from Athlone to Mullingar, along the disused Athlone-Mullingar Railway. It will eventually form part of the Dublin–Galway Greenway. A new cycle and pedestrian bridge over the River Shannon was built beside the Luan Gallery and opened in August 2023.

== Education and industry ==
Athlone on the Shannon

Athlone is a major hub for the pharmaceutical industry in Ireland, hosting companies such as Novo, which acquired the Élan plant in the town from Alkermes in 2024; and Almac, which acquired the BioClin Laboratories facility in the town in 2017. Thermo Fisher Scientific also had a facility at the IDA Business and Technology Park in Garrycastle, however, plans for its closure were announced in January 2024. Several medical equipment providers are based in the town including Medtronic, Teleflex and Utah Medical. Other major employers include Ericsson, a telecommunications business; and Athlone Extrusions, a polymer supplier. Alienware, a computer hardware business; had a facility in the town, however, its closure was announced in 2009. ICT Eurotel, a former contact centre; was closed in the late 2000s.

Athlone is the regional centre for a large number of state-run and semi-state-run organisations. The Department of Education, State Examinations Commission, Revenue Commissioners, FÁS Midlands Region, Bus Éireann, Iarnród Éireann, IDA Ireland and Enterprise Ireland all have bases in the town. Athlone is also a major Irish military centre, as the Custume Barracks, which lie on the west bank of the Shannon in the town, is the headquarters of the Western Command of the Irish Army.

Athlone forms part of the Midlands Gateway, an in-progress infrastructure initiative, along with Mullingar and Tullamore.

The former Athlone Institute of Technology (AIT) is a constituent institution of the Technological University of the Shannon: Midlands Midwest (TUS), following its dissolution and merger with Limerick Institute of Technology (LIT) to form the AIT-LIT Consortium in 2021. The AIT had a campus size of 44 acres, and had new, purpose-built facilities include the Hospitality, Tourism and Leisure Studies building, built in 2003; the Nursing and Health Science building, built in 2005; the Midlands Innovation and Research Centre, also built in 2005; the Engineering and Informatics building, built in 2010; and the Postgraduate Research Hub, also built in 2010. The RTÉ Midlands Regional Studio was formerly located at AIT during the 2010s, having been relocated from St. Mary's Place in Athlone.

The Athlone Institute of Technology had memorandum of understanding with the Rio de Janeiro State University, one of the largest universities in the Brazilian city. AIT also had agreements with the Pontifical Catholic University of Minas Gerais, one of the largest Brazilian private universities. The institute also founded agreements with two leading Beijing universities, the Capital University of Economics and Business and the Beijing Union University. The agreements were signed by the Chinese Ambassador to Ireland and university representatives. Other agreements existed between the AIT and TVTC, in Saudi Arabia, and a memorandum of understanding existed with the Georgia Institute of Technology. Further agreements existed with the Bharati Vidyapeeth, one of the largest universities in India.

There are four major secondary schools in the Athlone area, the Athlone Community College, a coeducational school; Our Lady's Bower School, a girls' school; Marist College, a boys' school; Coláiste Chiaráin, a secondary school resulting from the amalgamation of St. Aloysius' College and St Joseph's College, Summerhill in 2017.

In June 2010, Taoiseach Brian Cowen announced his support of a proposed European and Chinese training hub in Athlone. In May 2012, the project was granted permission by An Bord Pleanála. It was planned to comprise a total of nine exhibition halls, nine smaller independent exhibition buildings, one temporary exhibition space, several offices, administrative services, some living quarters, hotels, shops, restaurants, pubs, a school and railway station. It was never built.

== Broadcasting ==
Between 1932 and 1975 the main radio transmission centre for Irish radio was located at Moydrum, Athlone (53°25′14″N 7°52′52″W). The original call sign was 2RN, a wordplay on the song "Come back to Erin". The Pontifical High Mass of the 31st International Eucharistic Congress held in Dublin was broadcast using the station in 1932. The station was officially opened by Éamon de Valera in 1933. It was known as "Radio Athlone", subsequently becoming known as "Radio Éireann" in 1938. The station originally operated with a 60 kW Marconi transmitter, which was later upgraded to 100 kW. For an antenna, a T-antenna was used, which spins between two 300 foot tall masts. The Marconi transmitter was replaced in 1958 with a Brown Boveri transmitter, also rated at 100 kW.

The Tullamore transmitter was built in 1975 to replace the station. In 1979, the Moydrum station reopened on a new dial position of 612 kHz for "Radio 2", later known as RTÉ 2fm, before transmissions ended in 2004. Moydrum was also the location of Ireland's short-lived shortwave international radio service, which was closed down in 1948 due to lack of money.

The RTÉ Midlands Regional Studio is located in Athlone, at Daneswell Business Park.

Athlone is served by regional stations Midlands 103 on 95.4 FM, and Shannonside on 104.1 FM. i102-104FM, a radio station geared to the 15–34 age group of the Midlands and Northeast, was launched in 2008. In 2011, i102-104FM merged with its sister station i105-107FM; the combined station began broadcasting as iRadio.

The Athlone Community Taskforce and several members of the Roscommon community radio station, RosFM, have begun broadcasting from the Athlone area under the banner of Athlone Community Radio. Their first broadcast was on 15 March 2008 and the broadcasts were originally set to run every Saturday and Sunday for the following 15 weeks, until their temporary licence expired. They received a 10-year licence on 14 January 2011 from the Broadcasting Authority of Ireland, and they currently broadcast on the frequency of 88.4 FM.

== Print ==
Local newspapers include the Westmeath Independent located on Golden Island Street which was established in 1846, and the Athlone Topic.

== Sport ==
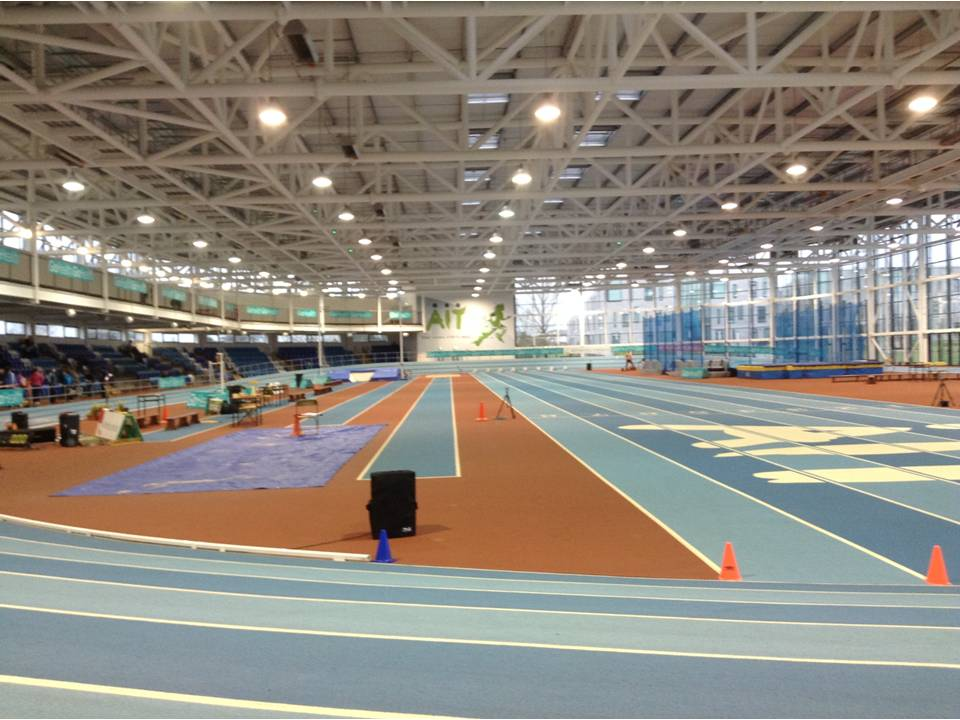
The Athlone International Arena at Athlone IT in 2015

In addition to being home to the Athlone Regional Sports Centre, a number of sporting organisations are based in the town. These include Athlone Town Football Club, who play their home games at Athlone Town Stadium in Lissywollen, an arena with a 3,000 person capacity as of 2023. Athlone Town FC won the League of Ireland Championship in 1981 and 1983, as well as the FAI Cup in 1924. The team also qualified for the 1975–76 UEFA Cup, where they played 0–0 against AC Milan.

The Athlone International Arena, which cost ten million euro to build, was opened in 2013 as Ireland's first "world-class" indoor athletics arena. It has a floor space of nearly 10,000 square metres. The opening of the arena, which was opened by Taoiseach Enda Kenny, was described by Senator Eamonn Coghlan as the "best news story in Irish athletics history". The stadium hosted the inaugural AIT International Grand Prix in 2014. The AIT International Grand Prix had been held annually until 2021, when it was announced that year's event would be cancelled in response to the COVID-19 pandemic.

Athlone hosted the European Triathlon Championships in 2010 when approximately 4,500 athletes participated in the event. Alistair Brownlee of Great Britain won the event.

Athlone is home to several Gaelic football teams, including Tubberclair GAA, Garrycastle GAA, and Athlone GAA, with St. Brigids (Roscommon) GAA and Clann na nGael GAA being located outside Athlone itself. Having won the 2011 Leinster Senior Club Football Championship, Garrycastle GAA qualified for the 2011–12 All-Ireland Senior Club Football Championship final for the first time in the club's history by beating Connacht Champions, St. Brigids GAA, in an all-Athlone semi-final.

Athlone is also home to Buccaneers RFC, whose club's grounds are at Dubarry Park. Dubarry Park, with a 10,000 person capacity as of 2023, is also home to the Connacht Eagles. The Eagles represented Connacht in the British and Irish Cup, and have competed in the All-Ireland Interprovincial 'A' Championship during the 2020s.

The town is also home to Lough Ree Yacht Club.

The European Capital of Sport awarded Athlone the title of European Town of Sport for 2013.

There are several golf courses near Athlone, including Athlone Golf Club, Glasson Golf & Country Club and Mount Temple Golf Club.

== Notable people ==
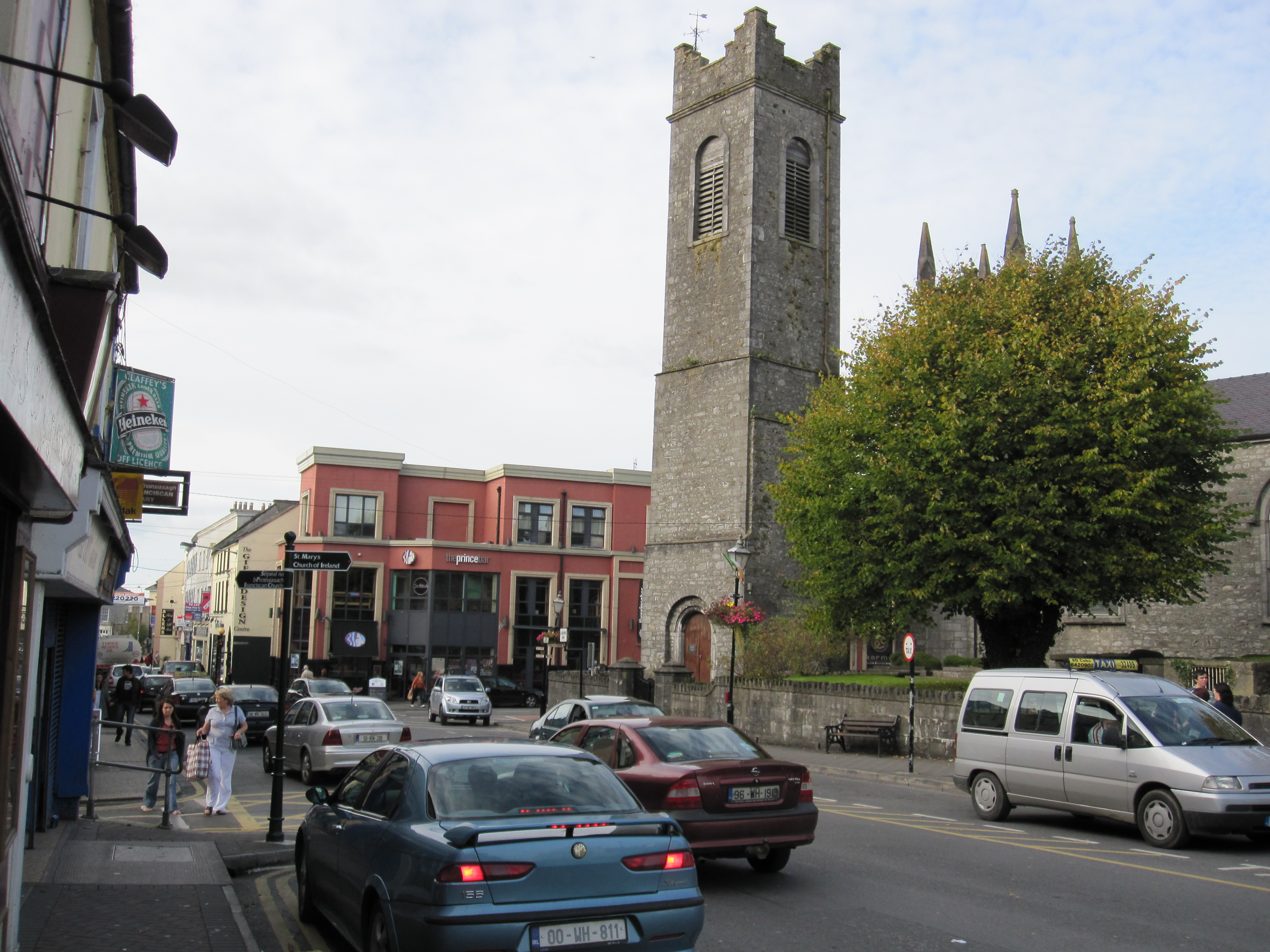
St. Mary's Church (CoI) in Athlone

- The Earls of Athlone
- Pat Barlow (1914–1986), professional footballer
- Robbie Benson (born 1992), professional footballer
- Paul Brock, accordionist
- John Broderick (1924–1989), novelist
- James J. Browne, former president of the National University of Ireland, Galway (2008–2018)
- Jack Carty (born 1992), Connacht and Ireland rugby union player
- John Crowe (Dean Crowe; died 1955), parish priest of St. Peter's parish on the Roscommon side of Athlone
- Michael Joseph Curley (1879–1947), Catholic Archbishop and educationalist
- Stephen Donohoe (born 1984), jockey and sailor
- Thomas Duffy (1806–1868), recipient of the Victoria Cross
- Lisa Dwan (born 1977), actress
- Jimmy Elliott (1838–1883), Irish-American world heavyweight boxing champion from 1865 to 1868
- Thomas Flynn (1842–1892), Victoria Cross recipient
- John Ellard Gore (1845–1910), astronomer, one of the founding members of British Astronomical Association
- Robbie Henshaw (born 1993), Irish rugby union player
- Anthony Kelly (born 1957), FRS, UK government adviser and professor at University of Cambridge and University of Southampton
- Henry Kelly (1946–2025), journalist and television presenter, grew up in Athlone
- Ralph Kenna (1964–2023), physicist, born in Athlone
- Declan Lynch (born 1961), novelist and playwright
- David Madigan (born 1962), statistician
- John McCormack (1884–1945), tenor
- Nicky McFadden (1962–2014), Teachta Dála
- Seán McLoughlin (born 1990), YouTube game commentator known as Jacksepticeye
- Stefan Molyneux (born 1966), far-right podcaster and former YouTuber
- T. P. O'Connor (1848–1929), journalist and Member of Parliament
- Caroline O'Donnell (born 1974), architect and author
- Feargal O'Rourke (born 1964), accountant and taxation pioneer
- Mary O'Rourke (1937–2024), politician of various ministry roles and author
- Richard Rothwell (1800–1868), 19th-century Irish portrait and genre painter
- Marcus Seoige (born 1976), actor
- Brendan Shine (born 1947), folk/country singer
- George Thomas Stokes (1843–1898), ecclesiastical historian

== International relations ==
=== Sister cities ===
- Providence, Rhode Island, United States

=== Twin towns ===
- Chateaubriant, France

== See also ==
- Athlone Pursuivant
- Corlea Trackway
- List of towns and villages in the Republic of Ireland
- List of market houses in the Republic of Ireland
