= St. Mary's Church, Athlone =

St. Mary's Church (Church of Ireland), Athlone
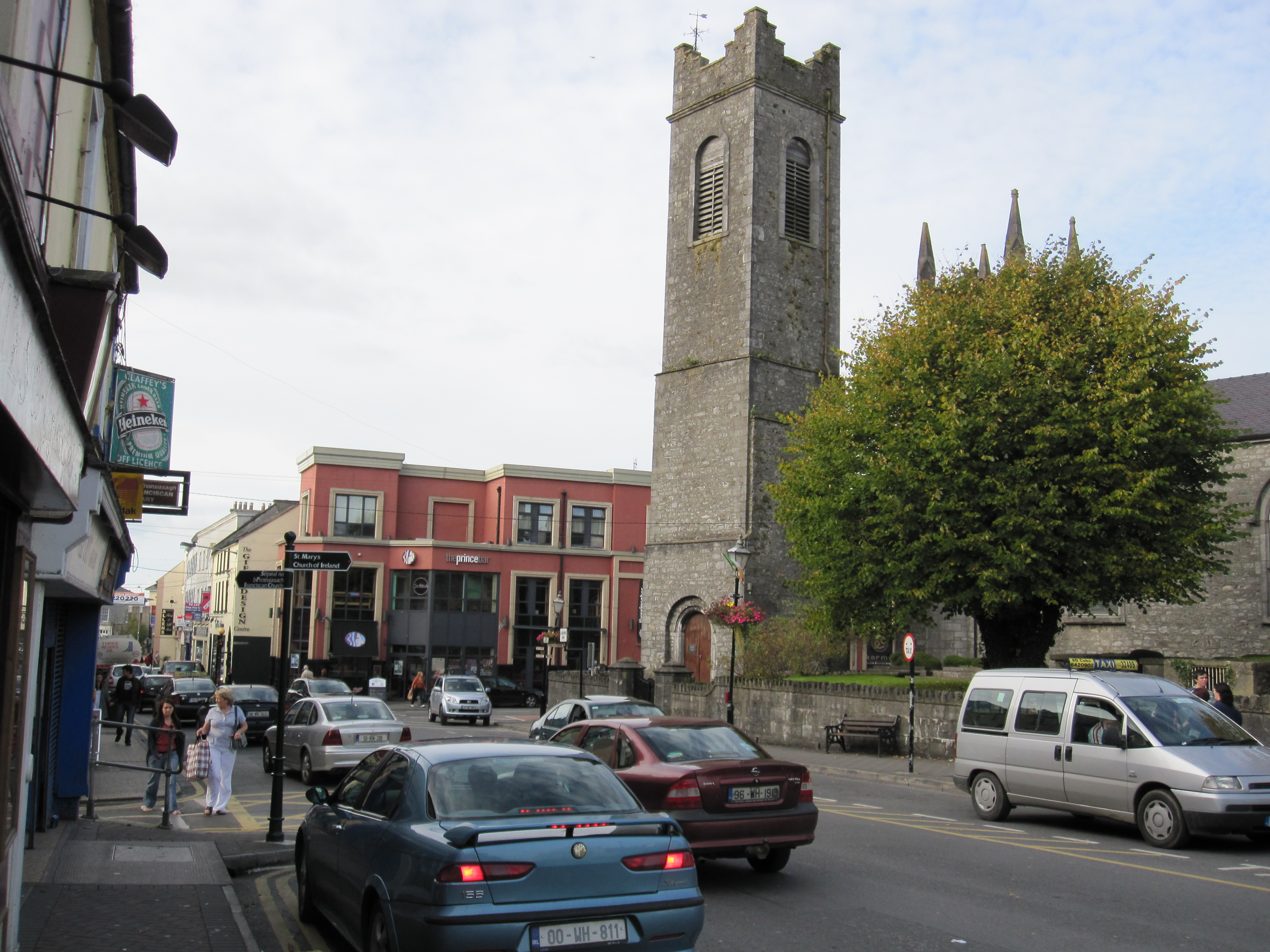
- St. Mary's Church of Ireland, Athlone
- St. Mary's Church (Church of Ireland), Athlone
- 53.42374°N 7.93795°W
- Location: Church Street, Athlone, County Westmeath
- Country: Ireland
- Denomination: Church of Ireland (Anglican)
- Website: Athlone Union of Parishes website

History
- Dedication: St. Mary

Architecture
- Completed: c. 1827
- Construction cost: £2,300

Specifications
- Materials: Limestone, marble, stained glass

Administration
- Province: Dublin and Cashel
- Diocese: Meath and Kildare
- Deanery: Athlone
- Parish: Athlone Union of Parishes (Athlone, Benown, Forgney, Moate, Clonmacnoise)

Clergy
- Rector: Revd. William Steacy

St. Mary's Church is a 19th-century Church of Ireland parish church in the town of Athlone, County Westmeath, Ireland. It is included in the Record of Protected Structures maintained by Westmeath County Council.

== History ==
St. Mary's Church of Ireland church is situated on an elevated site within Athlone's former town walls. The boundary walls of the site, which have been occupied by a church since at least the 1620s, may contain fabric from the 17th-century town walls.

The present church was constructed c. 1827 beside the belfry of an earlier church. Described in A Topographical Dictionary of Ireland (published by Samuel Lewis in 1837) as "a neat edifice, with a square embattled tower", its construction was funded by the Board of First Fruits and its design is attributed to Richard Richards of County Roscommon.

It was extended, c. 1869, when James Rawson Carroll added a new chancel to the east.
