= John Broderick (writer) =

Irish writer

John Broderick (Athlone, Ireland, 30 July 1924 – Bath, England, 28 May 1989) was an Irish novelist.

== Biography ==
Broderick was born in Athlone, Ireland, on 30 July 1924. He was the only child of the proprietors of a thriving local business, Broderick's Bakery. His father died when he was three years old. He began his secondary education at the Marist Brothers' School but at the age of 12, on his mother's remarriage to the bakery manager in 1936, he was sent to board at St Joseph's College, Garbally, Ballinasloe. He left in 1941 without sitting the Leaving Certificate and was expected to take over the bakery business, but always intended to write.

From 1951 he lived for a time in Paris where he knew some of the French and expatriate literary community, among them Gore Vidal, Truman Capote, James Baldwin and most importantly Julien Green. Green was a French academician, novelist and diarist, who became a mentor and personal friend. He visited Broderick in Athlone in 1974 and 1975.

Broderick lived most of his life in Athlone; with his mother until her death in 1974, and alone until he moved to Bath, England in 1981. He died in Bath on 28 May 1989.

== Literary work ==
The Irish Times accepted a travel article from Broderick in 1956. In the same year, the paper published the first of his book reviews. He continued to review widely and to write general articles for The Irish Times and Hibernia magazine, among others, until shortly before his death. As a critic he was frequently controversial being dismissive of a number of established writers including Heinrich Böll, Seamus Heaney and most notably Edna O'Brien while he was generous and encouraging to a host of young Irish writers.

His first novel, The Pilgrimage (1961) was banned by the Irish Censorship Board.

Broderick was elected to membership of the Irish Academy of Letters in 1968, and in 1975 received the Academy's Annual Award for Literature. The Westmeath County Library system has a collection of his papers, manuscripts and other materials.

== Books ==
Broderick's novels include:

- The Pilgrimage (1961). London: Weidenfeld & Nicolson. It was banned in Ireland by the Censorship Board and published in the United States as The Chameleons. In the same year it was published in France by Editions Plon as Le Pélerinage. It was reissued in France in 1991 by Editions de la Découverte and in Ireland (2004) by The Lilliput Press.
- The Fugitives (1962). London: Weidenfeld & Nicolson and Paris: Editions Plon.
- Don Juaneen (1963). London: Weidenfeld & Nicolson.
- The Waking of Willie Ryan (1965). London: Weidenfeld & Nicolson, reissued 2004, Dublin: The Lilliput Press.
- An Apology for Roses (1973). London: Calder & Boyars.
- The Pride of Summer (1976). London: Harrap.
- London Irish (1979). London: Barrie & Jenkins.
- The Trial of Father Dillingham (1974). Paris: Editions Plon as Cité Pleine des Rêves. (1982) London & New York:Marion Boyars.
- A Prayer for Fair Weather (1984). London: Marion Boyars.
- The Rose Tree (1985). London & New York: Marion Boyars.
- The Flood (1987). London & New York: Marion Boyars.
- The Irish Magdalen (1991). London: Marion Boyars (published posthumously).

== Memorials ==
Since 1999, Broderick has been commemorated in a number of ways, including:

- The Athlone Town Council named a street John Broderick Street
- The John Broderick Committee financially supported the publication of Something in the Head, the Life and Works of John Broderick, by Madeline Kingston (Lilliput 2004) and also the re-issue of The Pilgrimage and The Waking of Willie Ryan
- In 2007 Lilliput also published Stimulus of Sin, a selection of Broderick's non-fiction writings with some previously unpublished fiction
- Literary week-ends and events to keep his memory alive have been and are being organised from time to time
