= Burgess Park (Athlone) =

Public park in Athlone, County Westmeath, Ireland

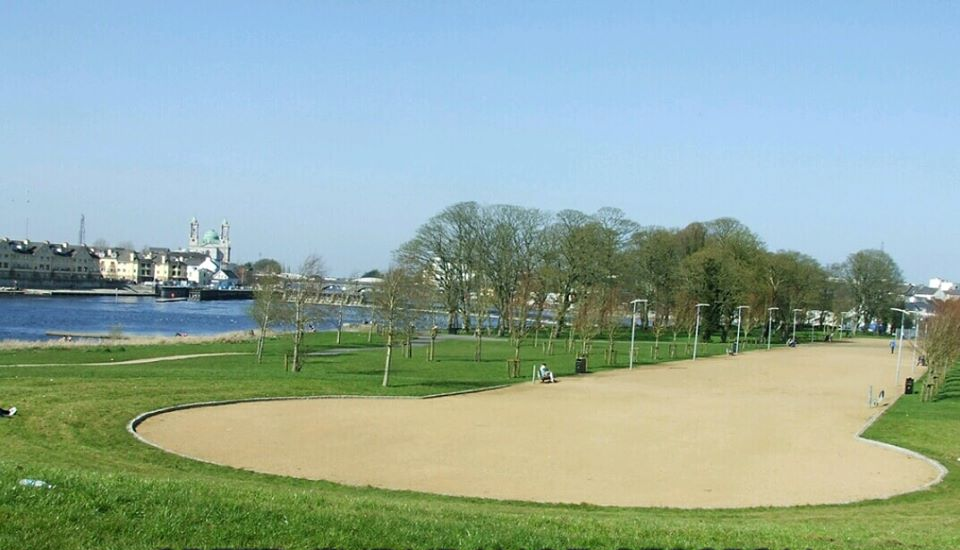
- Burgess Park
- Interactive map of Burgess Park
- Location: Athlone, County Westmeath
- Coordinates: 53°25′16″N 7°56′13″W

Burgess Park is a public park in Athlone, County Westmeath, Ireland. The park is located in the townland of Goldenisland (Kilmaine), on the banks of the River Shannon, which forms the border with County Roscommon.

The park contains a memorial garden, playground, walking trails and recreational areas.

== History ==
In December 2015, the park suffered flooding damage following Storm Frank, which saw the water levels of the River Shannon rise, causing flooding in several places along its banks.

A memorial garden was planted in 2016, to celebrate the centenary of the Easter Rising.

On 28 May 2020, a protest organized by Gemma O'Doherty were held at the park. The protests were in response to the 2020 coronavirus pandemic lockdown, which protestors described as being 'unlawful.
