= All-Ireland Drama Festival =

Annual amateur theatre competition

The All-Ireland Drama Festival, known for sponsorship reasons as the "RTÉ All-Ireland Drama Festival", is an amateur theatre competition organised by the Amateur Drama Council of Ireland. It takes place in the Dean Crowe Theatre, Athlone, County Westmeath each May. Amateur drama groups from across the island are chosen from a long-list to present a production in the venue, and the best production is awarded the grand prize.

A fringe festival includes a short-film competition. A playwrighting competition for secondary school students is also included in the festival.

== History ==
As part of the An Tóstal collection of festivals celebrating Irish culture, the festival began in 1953, and was staged in the General Textiles "Glenex"'s Sportex hall. Principal sponsors have been Esso, from 1959 to 1999, Ericsson from 2000 to 2003, and Raidió Teilifís Éireann from 2004.

=== Festival directors ===
- Brendan O'Brien (1952–1992)
- Colm Kelly (1992–2002)
- Billy Nott (2002-2012)
- Joe MacCarrick (2012-2018)
- Regina Bushell (2018–2025)
- Michael McGlone (2025–present)

== List of Perpetual Trophy winners ==
=== RTÉ sponsorship ===
- 2002 Ballyduff Drama Group
- 2004 Ballyduff Drama Group
- 2005 Corn Mill Theatre Group
- 2006 Kilmeen Drama Group
- 2007 Silken Thomas Players, Kildare town
- 2008 Estuary Players, Baldoyle
- 2009 Estuary Players, Baldoyle
- 2010 Silken Thomas Players, Kildare town
- 2011 Kilmeen Drama Group
- 2012 Kilmeen Drama Group
- 2013 Kilmeen Drama Group
- 2014 Corn Mill Theatre Group
- 2015 Palace Players, Kilworth/Fermoy
- 2016 Bridge Drama Group
- 2017 Dalkey Players
- 2018 Prosperous Dramatic Society
- 2019 Prosperous Dramatic Society
- 2020, 2021, No Festival due to COVID concerns
- 2022 Ballyduff Drama Group
- 2023 Dalkey Players
- 2024 Ballyduff Drama Group
- 2025 Ballyduff Drama Group

=== Ericsson sponsorship ===
- 2003 Knocknacarra Amateur Theatre Society (KATS)

== All-Ireland Confined Drama Finals ==
The All-Ireland Confined Drama Finals is a related competition, in which theatre groups with less experience, resources or fewer members, who have not been chosen for the Athlone Festival compete. The finals are staged in a different venue year to year.

=== List of Confined Drama Final Venues ===
- 2023 Glenamaddy
- 2024 Mountmellick
- 2025 Claremorris

== One Act Festival Circuit ==
The All-Ireland One Act Festival Circuit features amateur one-act productions. It is organised by the Drama League of Ireland, in conjunction with the Amateur Drama Council.

=== List of One Act Finals Venues ===
- 2024 Moat Theatre, Naas
- 2025 Tubbercurry

== Bibliography ==
- O'Brien, Gearóid, ed. (2002). All-Ireland Drama Festival Athlone 1953-2002 — 50 Glorious Years of Drama. All-Ireland Festival Committee.
