= Marcus Seoige =

Irish actor (born 1976)

Marcus Seoige (Irish pronunciation: [ˈʃoːɟə]; born 1976) is an Irish actor. He was born on Inis Mór (where the family would spend each summer), but raised in Athlone. At university he studied Fine Art and computer animation but became involved in acting via Martial arts and medieval weapons stunt fighting. This led to him choreographing fight sequences and stunts for TV and film such as King Arthur, with Clive Owen and Keira Knightley.

Work as an extra led to an audition for TG4's soap opera, Ros na Rún, which won him the part of 'love-rat' Johnny Stapelton.

He has also appeared in the TG4 drama Seacht and in TV3's adaptation of Ken Bruen's Jack Taylor novels, with Nora Jane Noone.
