= Church of Saints Peter and Paul, Athlone =

Church of Saints Peter and Paul
- Eaglais Naomh Peadar agus Naomh Pól
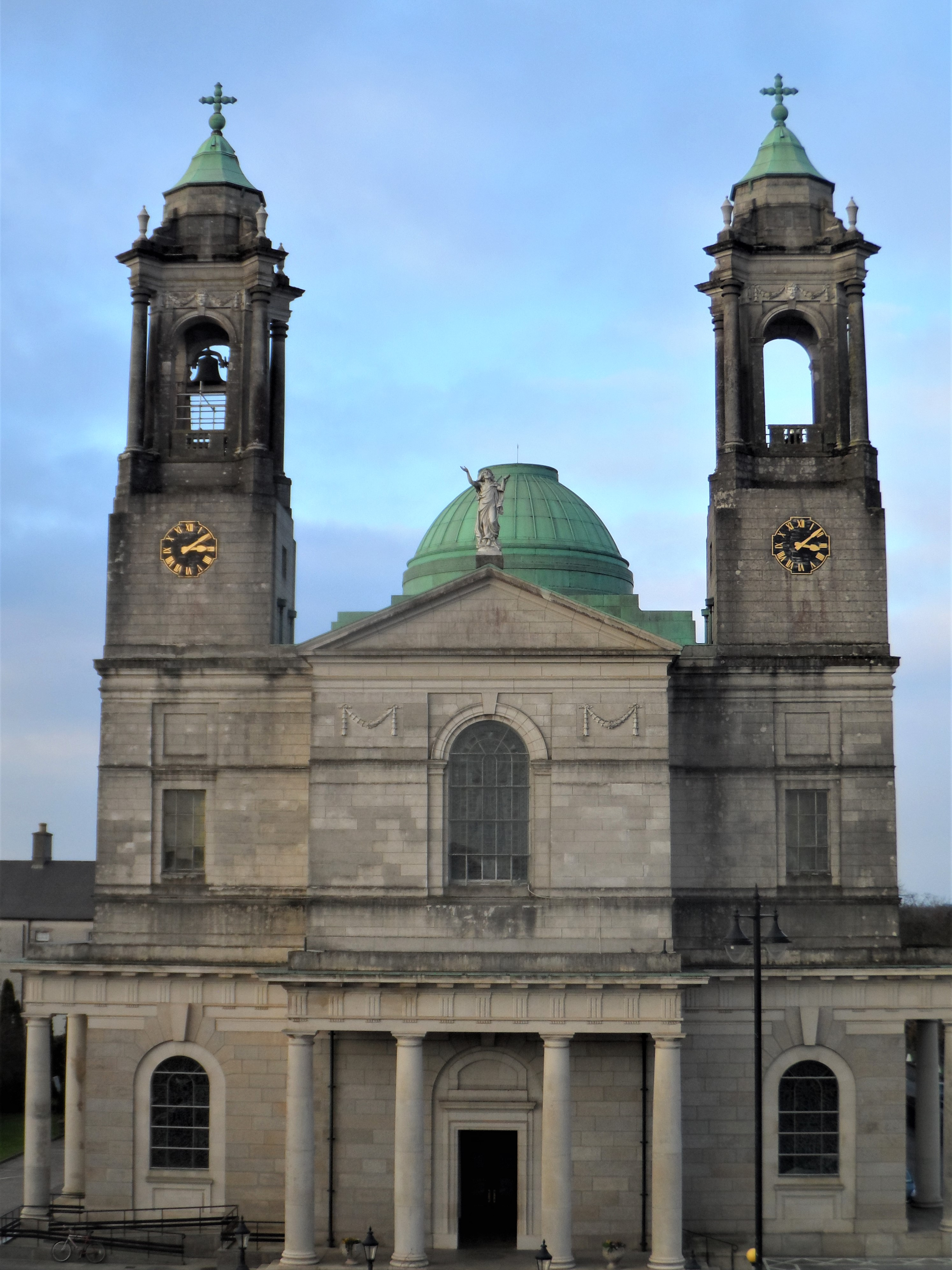
- Church of Saints Peter and Paul
- Church of Saints Peter and Paul
- 53.423924°N 7.943669°W
- Location: Market Square, Athlone, County Westmeath
- Country: Ireland
- Denomination: Roman Catholic
- Website: http://www.sspeterandpaulsparishathlone.com/gallery/ss-peter-paul-athlone/

History
- Dedication: St. Peter; Saint Paul

Architecture
- Architectural type: Baroque Revival
- Style: 1932
- Completed: 1939

Specifications
- Capacity: 2,000
- Materials: Portland stone, ashlar limestone, copper, Connemara marble, red marble, white marble, cast iron, stained glass

Administration
- Province: Tuam
- Diocese: Elphin
- Deanery: Athlone
- Parish: Ss. Peter & Paul, Athlone, Drum and Clonown

The Church of Saints Peter and Paul is a prominent Roman Catholic parish church located in Athlone, County Westmeath in Ireland. Situated on the western bank of the River Shannon, directly opposite Athlone Castle, the church serves as a significant landmark in the town. Dean John Crowe led the fundraising efforts for the church from the 1930's until his death in 1955.

== History and architecture ==
Constructed between 1932 and 1939, the church was designed by Irish architect Ralph Byrne in a Baroque Revival style, based on the Basilica of Saint Paul Outside the Walls. The neoclassical façade includes twin towers flanking a pedimented entrance and is constructed using materials such as Portland stone, ashlar limestone, and copper detailing. The church's interior is notable for its spacious nave and altar, adorned with intricate marble work and cast iron elements.

It is notable for its stained glass windows, produced in the Harry Clarke workshop by Richard King. These were crafted at the Harry Clarke Studio, depicting scenes of Saint Peter, Saint Paul, Saint Patrick, the Last Judgment, and Purgatory. The vibrant colors and detailed artistry of these windows contribute significantly to the church's interior beauty. An Túr Gloine artist A. E. Child was also consulted on window design.

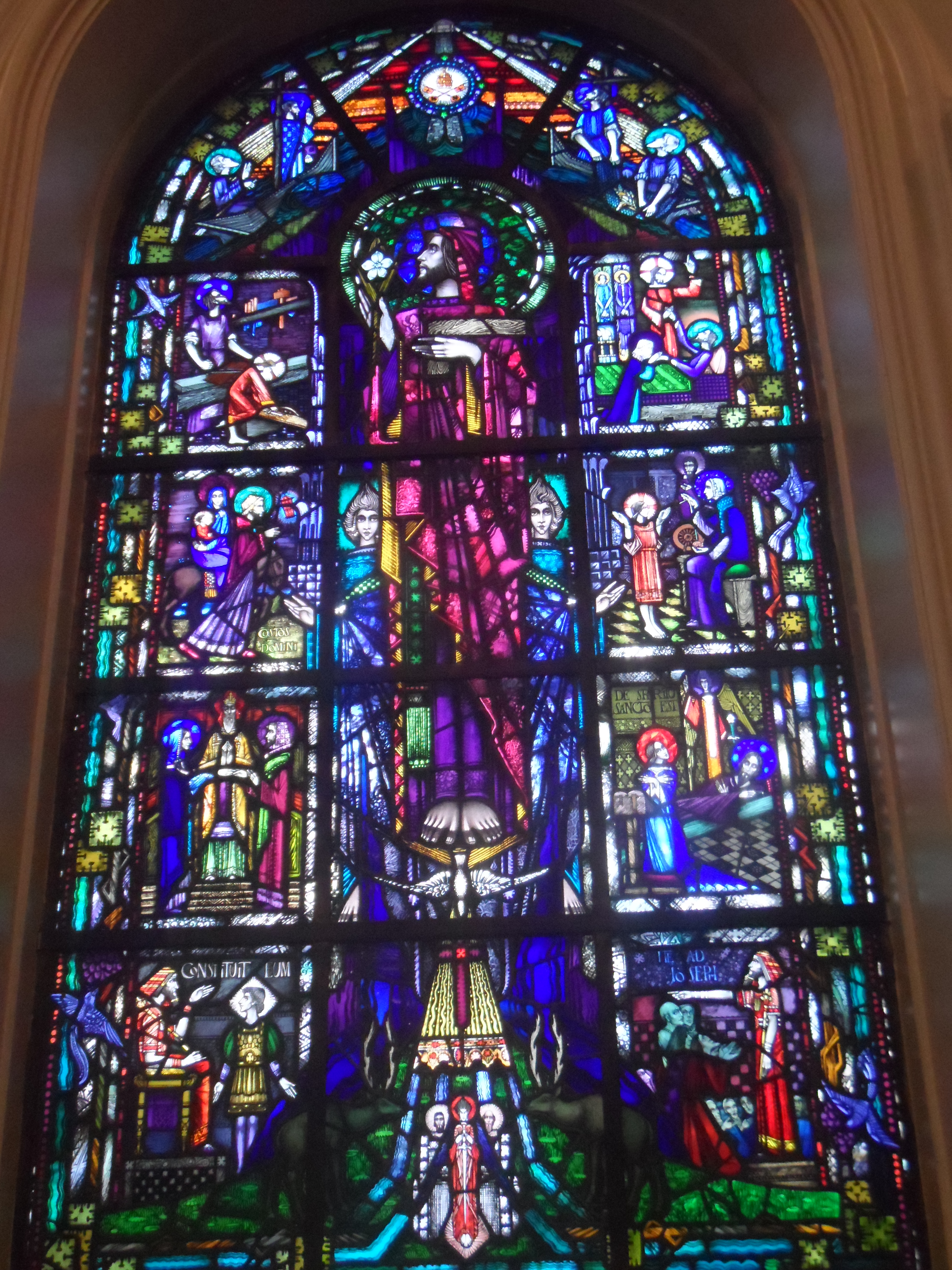
Saint Joseph window

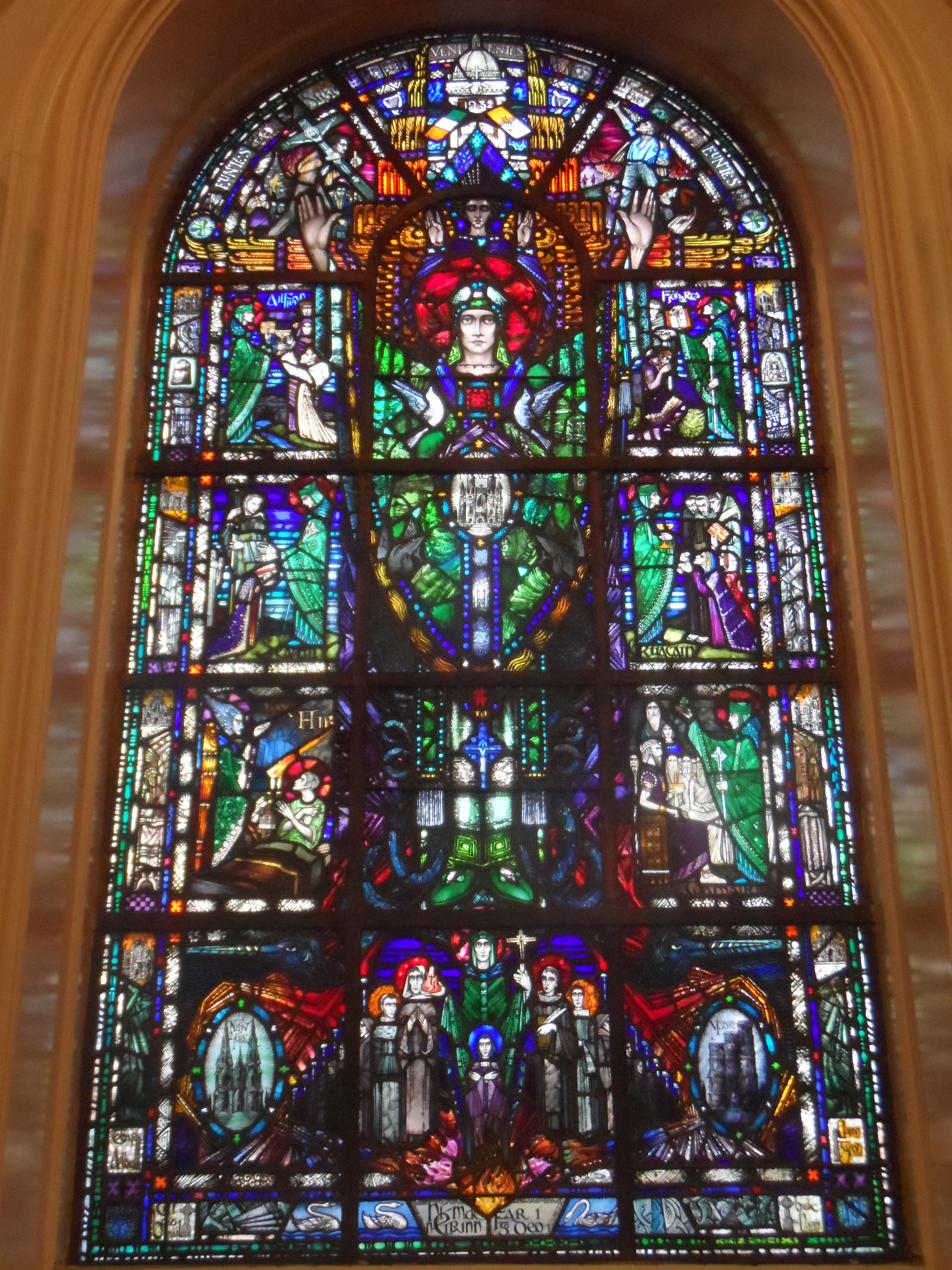
Saint Patrick window

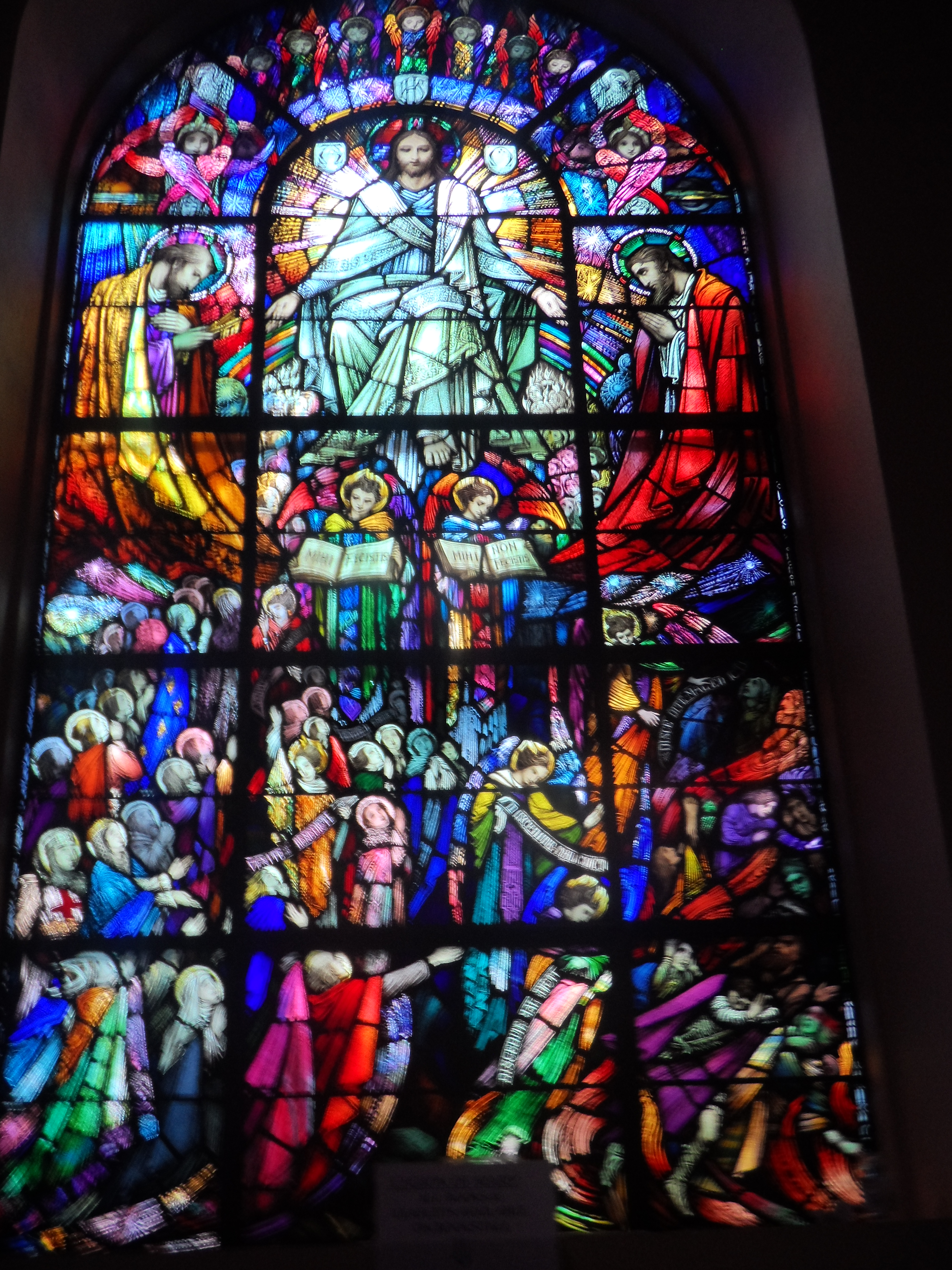
Last Judgment window

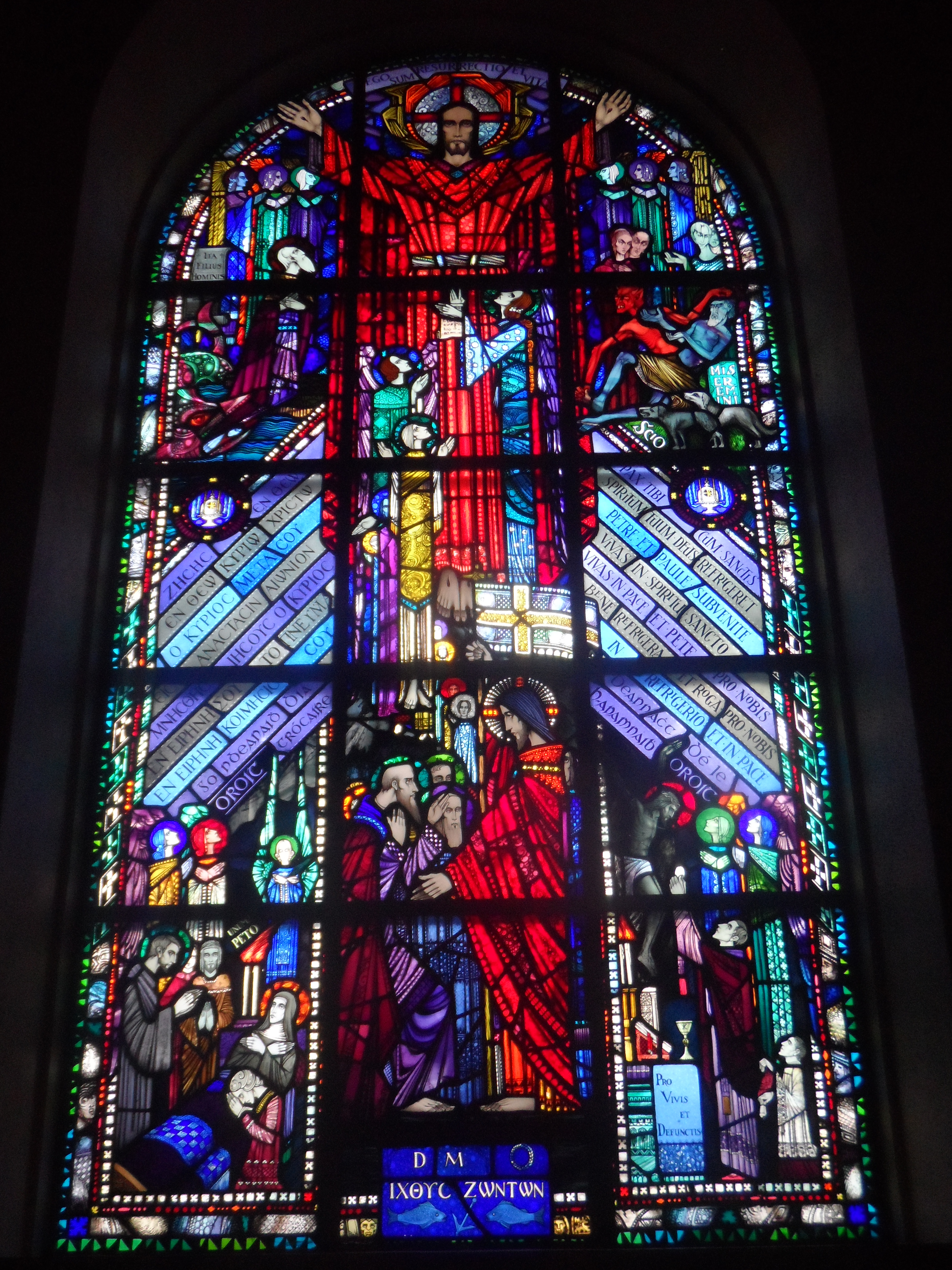
Purgatory window

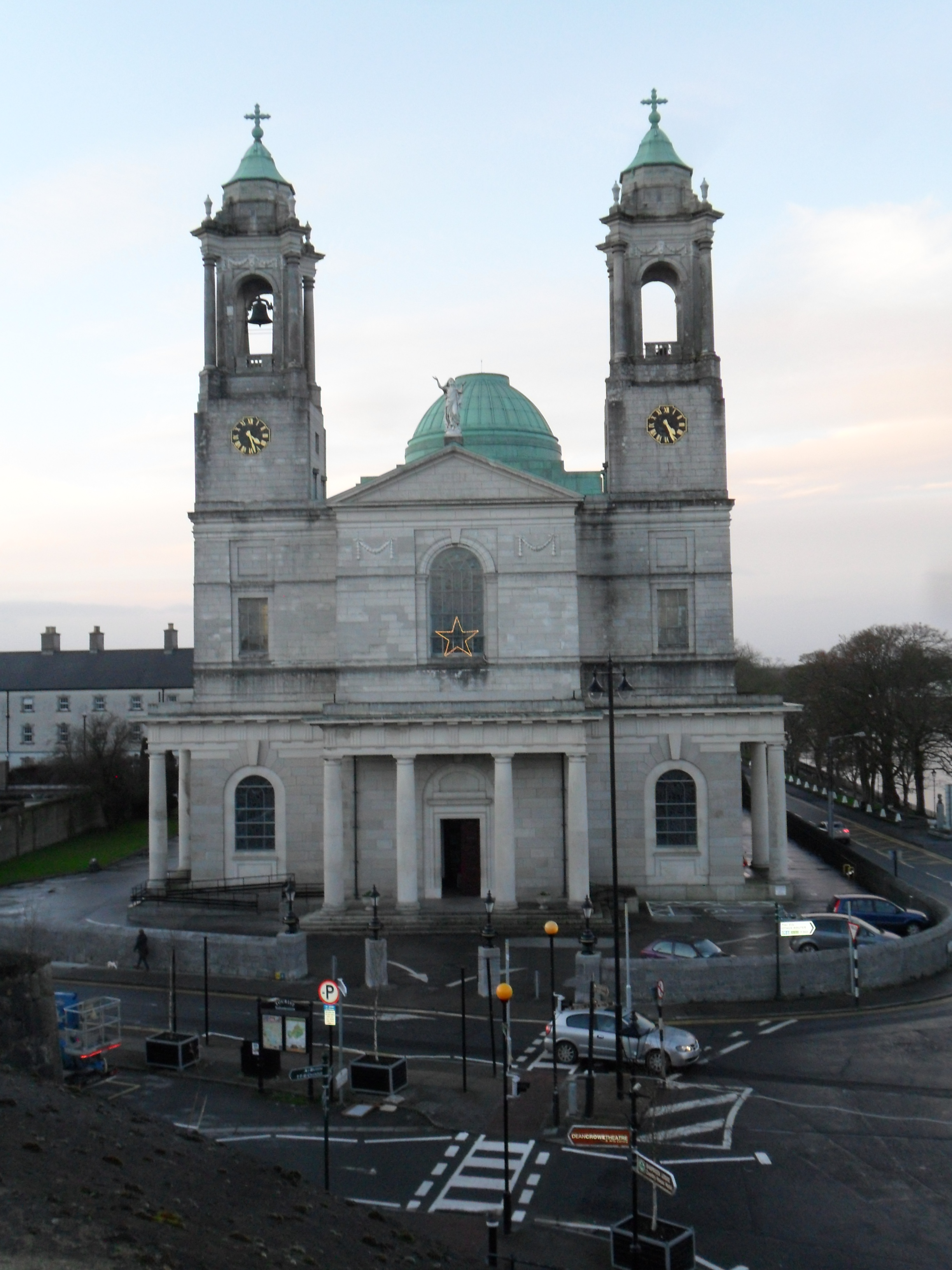
exterior

Parish Community

The Church of Saints Peter and Paul is part of the Ss. Peter and Paul Parish, which encompasses Athlone West and surrounding areas in County Roscommon. The parish is also served by St. Brigid's Church in Drum and Our Lady of the Wayside in Clonown. The church continues to be a central place of worship and community gatherings for residents and visitors alike.
