= List of national monuments in County Westmeath =

The Irish state has officially approved the following list of national monuments in County Westmeath. In the Republic of Ireland, a structure or site may be deemed to be a "national monument", and therefore worthy of state protection, if it is of national importance. If the land adjoining the monument is essential to protect it, this land may also be protected.

== National Monuments ==
NM#	Monument name	Description	Image	Townland	Location
520	Athlone Castle	Castle		Athlone	53°25′23″N 7°56′34″W
481	Delvin Castle	Castle		Delvin	53°36′40″N 7°05′37″W
560	Dunnamona	Motte		Dunnamona	53°29′58″N 7°47′01″W
610	Mortimer's Castle	Castle		Faughalstown	53°38′55″N 7°20′26″W
220	Fore town gates	Town gates		Fore	53°40′45″N 7°13′32″W
215	Fore Abbey	Abbey (Benedictine) & hermitage		Fore	53°41′02″N 7°13′38″W
265	Taghmon Church	Church		Glebe	53°36′03″N 7°15′59″W
213	Inchbofin	Early Medieval Ecclesiastical Site		Inchbofin	53°32′30″N 7°55′03″W
155	Ushnagh Hill, Catstone	Ringfort, Barrow & Stone		Ushnagh Hill	53°29′18″N 7°33′44″W
624	Portlick Motte	Motte		Portlick	53°29′28″N 7°54′38″W
572	Raharney Ringfort	Ringfort		Raharney	53°31′18″N 7°06′15″W
223	Bealin High Cross	High Cross		Twyford	53°26′07″N 7°50′42″W
606	Wattstown Barrows	Two Barrows (tumuli)		Wattstown	53°34′32″N 7°26′06″W

== Sources ==
- National Monuments in County Westmeath
