= Inchmore =

Inchmore is the name of several places in Ireland and Scotland:

- Inchmore, Kirkhill
- Inchmore, Strathfarrar
- Inchmore, a townland in Coolcraheen civil parish, County Kilkenny, Ireland
- Inchmore, a townland in Freshford civil parish, County Kilkenny, Ireland
- Inchmore, a townland in County Longford, Ireland
- Inchmore, a townland in County Westmeath, Ireland

== Other ==
- Inchmore (Tiernan), a townland in County Westmeath, Ireland
