= Ballinlassy =

Townland in County Westmeath, Ireland

Ballinlassy Baile an Leasa
- Townland
- Interactive map of Ballinlassy
- Coordinates: 53°22′05″N 7°50′07″W
- Country: Ireland
- Province: Leinster
- County: County Westmeath

Ballinlassy (Irish: Baile an Leasa) is a small townland in the civil parish of Kilcleagh and the historical barony of Clonlonan in County Westmeath, Ireland. Located near the village of Ballynahown, Ballinlassy borders the townlands of Cartrons, Killomenaghan & Farranmanny South to the north, Curraghbeg & Kilbillaghan to the west and Castletown to the east. The River Boor flows through the townland. Ballinlassy, which has an area of approximately 0.7 square kilometres (0.3 sq mi), had a population of 27 as of the 2011 census.
