= Clonlonan =

Barony in County Westmeath, Ireland

Clonlonan Cluain Lonáin
- Barony
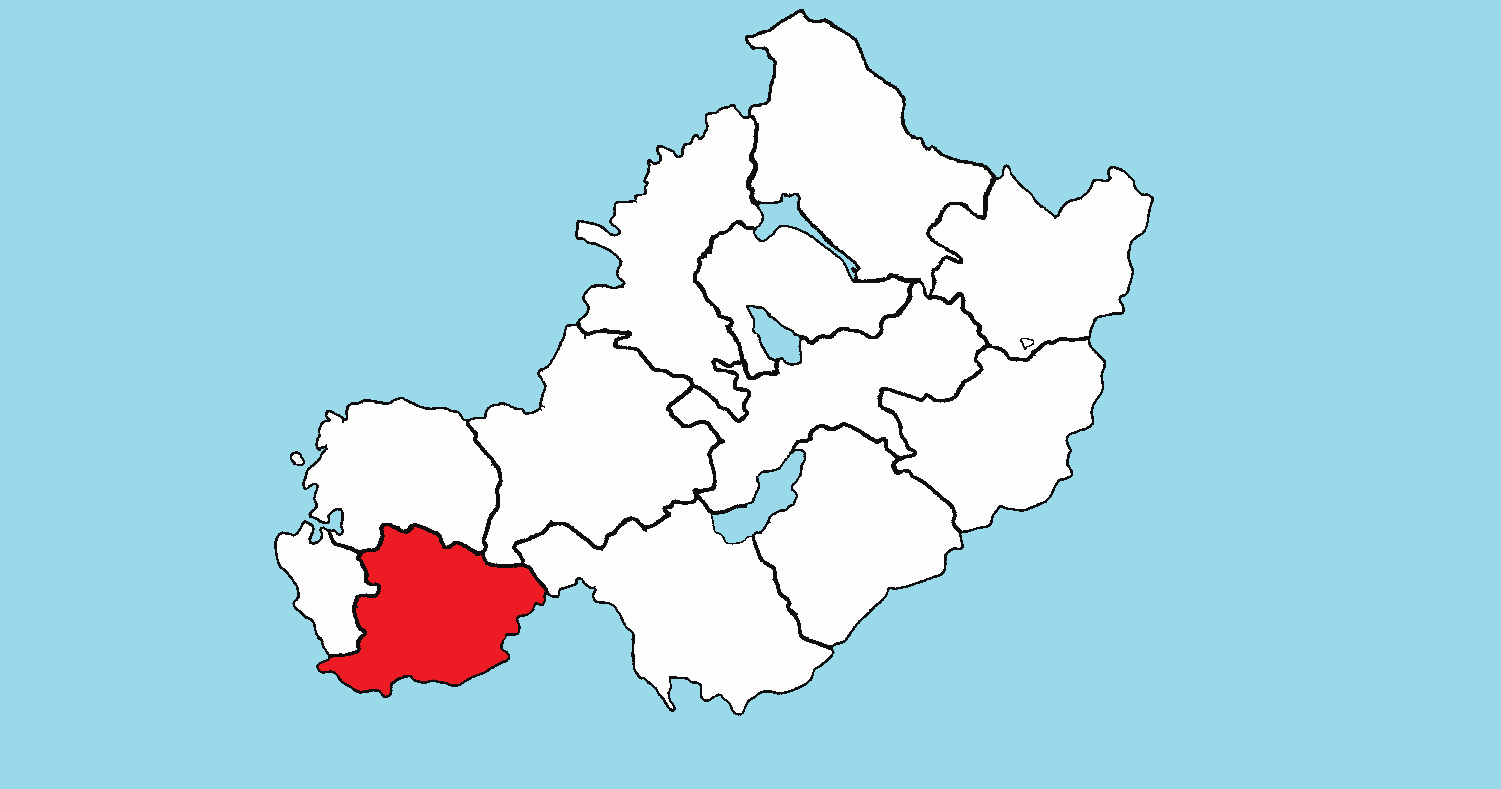
- Location of Clonlonan on a map of Westmeath

- Location in Ireland
- Coordinates: 53°23′48″N 7°47′35″W
- Country: Ireland
- Province: Leinster
- County: Westmeath

Area
  - Total: 120.7 km^{2} (46.6 sq mi)
- Time zone: UTC+0 (WET)
  - Summer (DST): UTC+1 (IST (WEST))
- Irish Grid Reference: N138385

Clonlonan (Irish: Cluain Lonáin) is a barony in south–west County Westmeath, Ireland. It was formed by 1672. It is bordered by County Offaly to the south and a small part of County Roscommon at Long Island on the River Shannon to the west. It also borders four other Westmeath baronies: Kilkenny West and Rathconrath (to the north), Moycashel (to the north–east) and Brawny (to the west). The largest centre of population in the barony is the town of Moate.

== Geography ==
Clonlonan has an area of 29,820.6 acres (120.680 km^{2}).

The Boor River runs west from near Moate, and flows into the River Shannon at the boundary of Westmeath and County Offaly.

Two significant roads pass through the barony. The M6, a motorway forming part of the N6 Dublin to Galway national primary road and the N62 connecting the M6 to the M8. In addition the R390, a regional road linking Athlone to Mullingar, the R444 linking the R357 at Shannonbridge, County Offaly with the N6 and the R446, part of the old N6 prior to the motorway, also feature.

A railway line carrying several of the national rail company Iarnród Éireann's intercity services also passes through the barony.

== Civil parishes of the barony ==
This table lists an historical geographical sub-division of the barony known as the civil parish (not to be confused with an Ecclesiastical parish).

Name in English	Name in Irish
Ballyloughloe	Baile Locha Luatha
Kilcumreragh	Cill Chruimthir Fhiachrach
Kilmanaghan	Cill Mhancháin
Kilcleagh	–

== Towns, villages and townlands ==
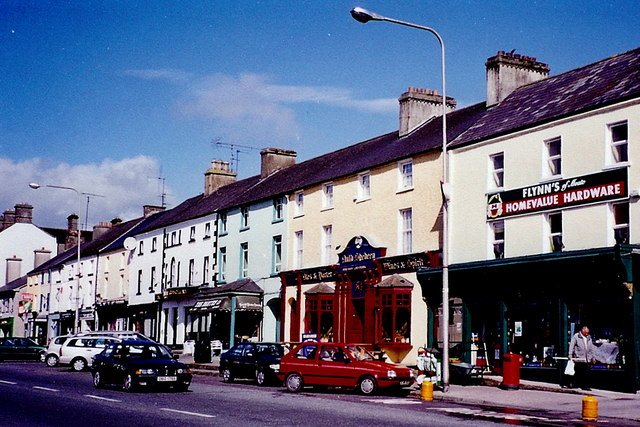
Main Street, Moate

- Moate, a town on the Cloghatanny River, also known as the Moate Stream, which is a tributary of the River Brosna.
- Ballynahown, a village on the N62 regional road 10 km (6.2 mi) south of Athlone and 5 km (3.1 mi) east of the River Shannon.
- Bealin
- Fardrum
- Mount Temple, a village about 6.5 km north–west of Moate.
- Moyvoughly, a hamlet north of Moate.

There are 130 townlands in the barony of Clonlonan.

== Places of interest ==
- Moate Castle, a former fortified house, built about 1550.
