= Noughaval (civil parish) =

Civil parish in Ireland

Noughaval Nuachabháil
- Civil parish
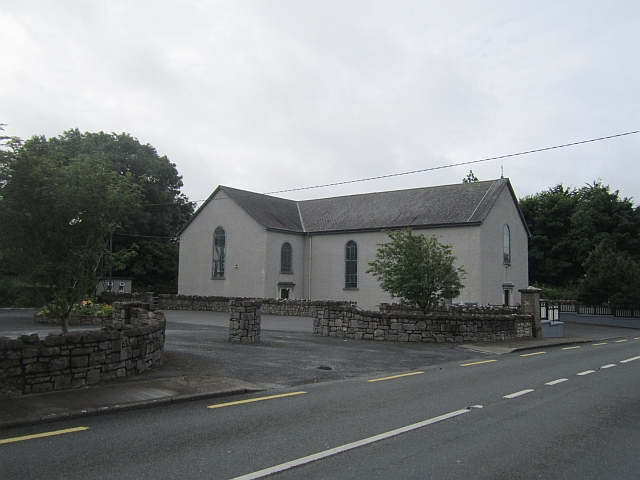
- Church of the Immaculate Conception, Tang, County Westmeath

- Location of Noughaval within County Westmeath and County Longford in Ireland
- Coordinates: 53°31′59″N 7°47′54″W
- Country: Ireland
- Province: Leinster
- County: County Westmeath and County Longford
- Irish grid reference: N112524

Noughaval (Irish: Nuachabháil) is a civil parish which spans the counties of Longford and Westmeath in Ireland. It is located about 30 km (19 mi) west of Mullingar and 22 km (14 mi) south of Longford.

== Description ==
Noughaval is one of 4 civil parishes in the barony of Kilkenny West and one of 8 civil parishes in the barony of Shrule, both in the province of Leinster. The civil parish covers 15,218.6 acres (61.587 km^{2}), 11,645.1 acres (47.126 km^{2}) in County Westmeath and 3,573.5 acres (14.461 km^{2}) in County Longford.

Noughaval civil parish comprises 41 townlands in County Westmeath and the village of Ballymahon and 10 townlands in County Longford.

County Westmeath: Aghafin, Aghanapisha, Ardnacrany North, Ardnacrany South, Ballynalone, Bawn, Brackagh, Cannorstown (Chapman), Cannorstown (Hogan), Carrick, Cartron, Cartroncroy, Cloghannagarragh, Clogher, Clonkeen, Coolaleena, Coolvin, Corbrack, Corlis, Creggan, Creggy, Doonamona, Doonis, Gortmore, Inchbofin, Inchturk, Kilcornan, Kippin, Lecade, Lisdossan, Lissaquill, Lissoy, Maghera, Muckanagh, Nicholastown, Noughaval, Rath Lower, Rath Upper, Ross, Streamstown and Tonlegee.

County Longford: Annagh, Carrickbeg, Cartron, Clooncullen, Creevagh Beg, Creevaghmore, Garrynagh, Keel, Keelbaun and Rathmore.

Note: The Longford townland of Annagh is in the barony of Rathcline.

The neighbouring civil parishes are: Forgney (County Longford) to the north, Ballymore to the east, Bunown, Drumraney and Kilkenny West to the south, and Shrule (Longford) to the west and north.
