= Ballymore (civil parish) =

Civil parish in County Westmeath, Ireland

Ballymore An Baile Mór
- Civil parish
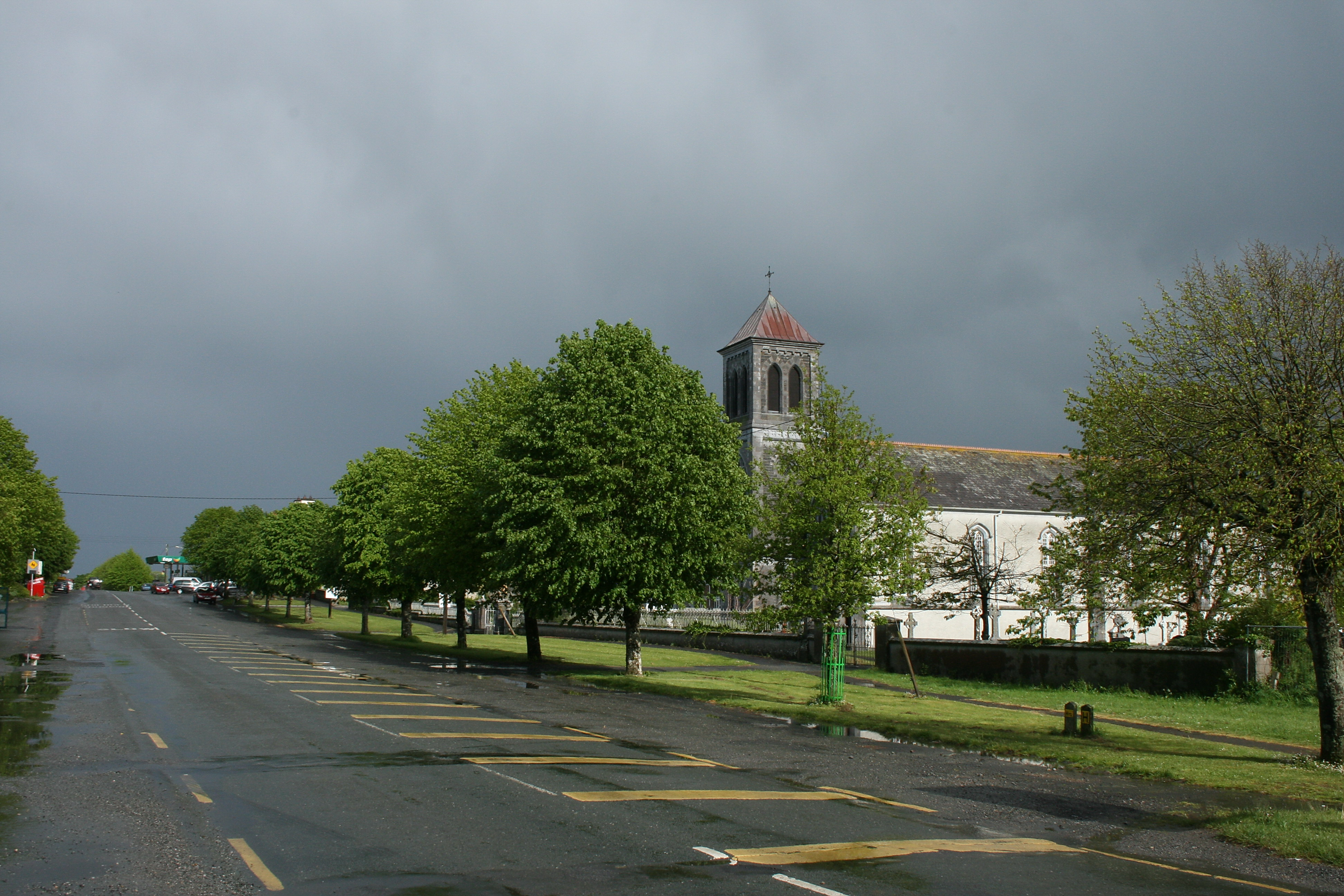
- Ballymore village

- Location of Ballymore within County Westmeath, Ireland
- Coordinates: 53°29′6″N 7°41′40″W
- Country: Ireland
- Province: Leinster
- County: County Westmeath
- Irish grid reference: N203483

Ballymore (Irish: An Baile Mór) is a civil parish in County Westmeath, Ireland. It is located about 24 km (15 mi) west of Mullingar.

Ballymore is one of nine civil parishes in the barony of Rathconrath in the province of Leinster. The civil parish covers 10,434.9 acres (42.229 km^{2}).

Ballymore civil parish comprises the village of Ballymore and 22 townlands: Ballinlig Lower, Ballinlig Upper, Ballymore, Ballynacorra, Ballynafearagh, Calliaghstown, Carricknagower, Cloncullen, Dungolman, Glebe, Harrystown, Lugacaha, Milltown, Moneynamanagh or Umma Beg, Moyvoughly, Mullenmeehan, Newtown, Raheen, Shinglis, Snimnagorta, Toorevagh, Umma Beg or Moneynamanagh and Umma More.

The neighbouring civil parishes are: Forgney and Noughaval (County Longford) to the north, Killare to the east, Ballyloughloe and Kilcumreragh to the south and Drumraney and Noughaval to the west.
