= Kilcleagh (civil parish) =

Civil parish in County Westmeath, Ireland

Kilcleagh Cill Chliathach
- Civil parish
- Location of Kilcleagh within County Westmeath in Ireland
- Coordinates: 53°22′26″N 7°48′16″W
- Country: Ireland
- Province: Leinster
- County: County Westmeath
- Irish grid reference: N130359

Kilcleagh (Irish: Cill Chliathach) is a civil parish in County Westmeath, Ireland. It is located about 34.79 kilometres (22 mi) west–south–west of Mullingar.

Kilcleagh is one of 4 civil parishes in the barony of Clonlonan in the Province of Leinster. The civil parish covers 15,181.6 acres (61.438 km^{2}).

Kilcleagh civil parish comprises part of the town of Moate and 65 townlands: Aghafin, Aghanargit, Agharanny, Agharevagh East, Agharevagh West, Aghavoneen, Aghnasullivan, Attimurtagh, Ballinlassy, Ballycahillroe, Ballydonagh, Ballynahown, Ballynahownwood, Ballynakill, Ballynamuddagh, Ballyscarvan, Baltrasna, Blackories, Boggagh (Conran), Boggagh (Fury), Boggagh (Malone), Boggagh Eighter, Bolinarra, Bolyconor, Boyanagh (Earl), Boyanagh (Malone), Cartronkeel, Cartrons, Castletown, Clonaltra (King), Clonaltra West, Clonlonan, Clonmore, Clonydonnin, Cregganmacar, Curraghbeg, Curries, Fardrum, Farnagh, Farranmanny North, Farranmanny South, Fearmore, Glebe East, Glebe West, Gorteen, Hall, Kilbillaghan, Kilcleagh, Kilgarvan, Kilgarvan Glebe, Kill, Killogeenaghan, Killomenaghan, Knockanea, Lowerwood, Moategranoge, Moneen, Newcastle, Ories, Scroghil, Seeoge, Sheean, Toorydonnellan, Tubbrit and Tullanageeragh.

The neighbouring civil parishes are: Ballyloughloe to the north, Kilmanaghan to the east, Clonmacnoise and Lemanaghan (both County Offaly) to the south and St. Mary's to the west.
