= Inishbofin =

Inishbofin (Irish for 'island of the white cow') may refer to several islands in Ireland:

- Inishbofin, County Galway
- Inishbofin, County Donegal

== See also ==
- Inchbofin, County Westmeath
