= Aghanashanamore =

Townland in Mount Temple, County Westmeath, Ireland

Coordinates: 53°25′54″N 7°47′09″W

- Townland
- Interactive map of Aghanashanamore
- Country: Ireland

Aghanashanamore is a townland in the civil parish of Ballyloughloe in County Westmeath, Ireland, east of Athlone and bordered by Mount Temple.
