= Ballyloughloe =

Civil parish in County Westmeath, Ireland

Ballyloughloe Baile Locha Luatha
- Civil parish
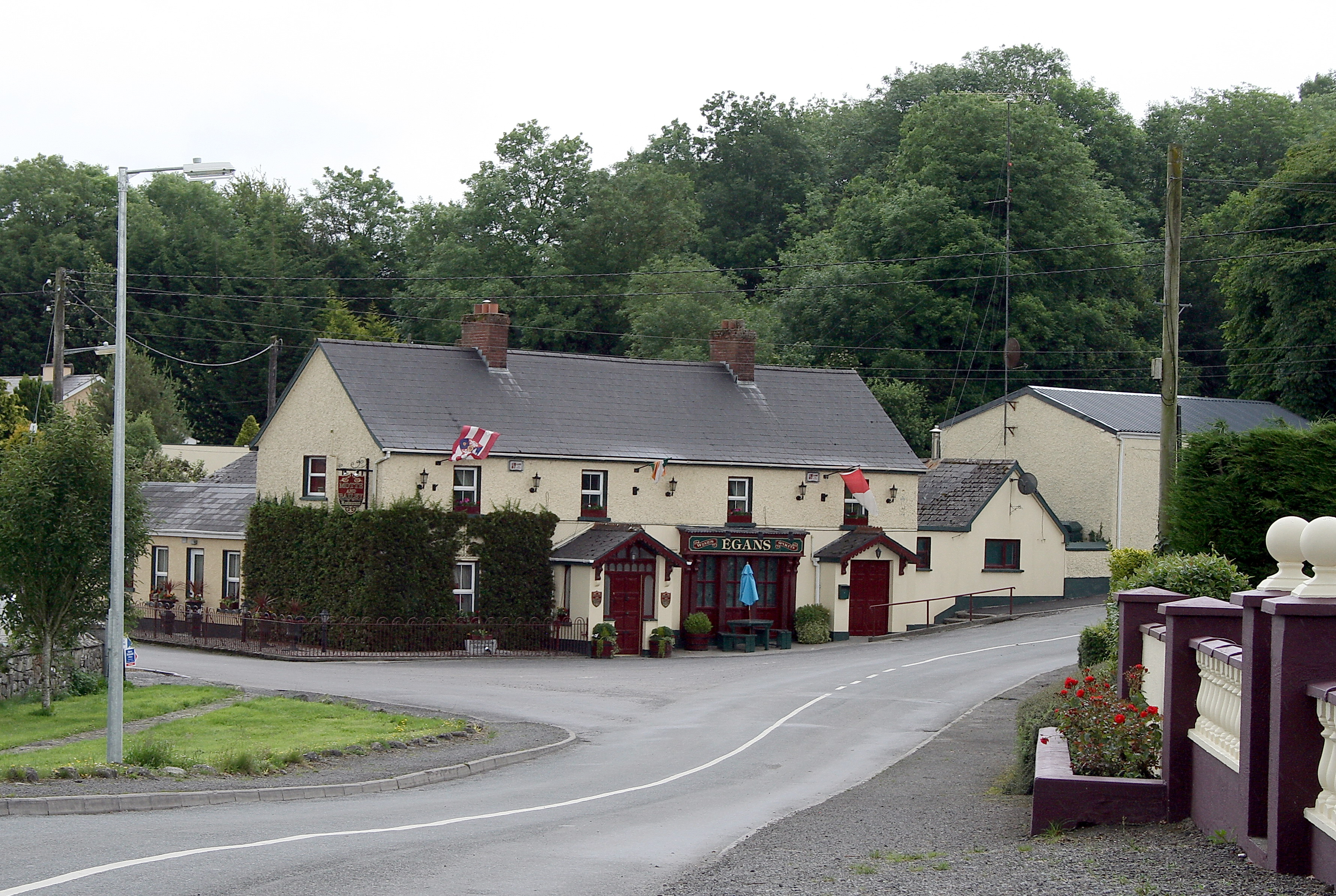
- Mount Temple

- Location of Ballyloughloe within County Westmeath, Ireland
- Coordinates: 53°25′22″N 7°47′28″W
- Country: Ireland
- Province: Leinster
- County: County Westmeath
- Irish grid reference: N139414

Ballyloughloe (Irish: Baile Locha Luatha) is a civil parish in County Westmeath, Ireland. It is located about 32 km (20 mi) west–south–west of Mullingar.

Ballyloughloe is one of 4 civil parishes in the barony of Clonlonan in the province of Leinster. The civil parish covers 13,004 acres (52.63 km^{2}).

Ballyloughloe civil parish comprises 55 townlands: Aghanashanamore, Aghanvoneen, Annaghgortagh, Ardyduffy, Ballydoogan, Ballymurry, Ballynagarbry, Ballynagarbry (Mullock), Ballynagarbry (Pim), Bellanalack, Belville, Boyanaghcalry, Cappaghauneen, Cappaghbrack, Carnfyan, Carnpark, Clonrelick, Clonthread, Clonyegan, Cooleen, Coolvuck Lower, Coolvuck Upper, Correagh, Creeve, Creevebeg, Dunegan, Dunlom East, Dunlom West, Fassagh, Glebe, Glen, Killachonna (Castlemaine), Killachonna (Clibborn), Killachonna (Potts), Killeenatoor, Killinroan, Knockdomny, Labaun, Legan, Mackanranny, Magheramore, Mount Temple, Moydrum (East), Nahod Little, Nahod More, Rathduff, Shurock, Tullaghanshanlin, Tully, Tullybane, Tullywood, Twyford, Warren High, Warren Lower and Williamstown.

The neighbouring civil parishes are: Ballymore, Drumraney and Kilkenny West to the north, Kilcumreragh to the east, Kilcleagh and Kilmanaghan to the south and St. Mary's to the west.
