= Joshua Gee =

British merchant, publicist and writer

Joshua Gee (1667–1730) was a British merchant, publicist and writer in economics who mainly focused on trade.

Gee is best known for his book called The Trade and Navigation of Great Britain Consider'd which was first published in London, 1729, and had 20 editions worldwide.

== Early life ==
Joshua Gee was born in 1667 probably in London. His father, John Gee (1635–1704) of Moyvoughley, was a Quaker from Yorkshire. There is no information regarding his education.

== Merchant ==
In London, by age 27, Gee became a master of the Grocers' Company by purchase (without serving an apprenticeship) and a freeman in London. By 1700 he was already trading with the American colonies.

In 1715, Gee and Augustine Washington founded The Principio Company. It was backed by an association of British iron-masters, merchants, and capitalists. Principio produced pig-iron and bar-iron in the Province of Maryland and the Province of Virginia for sale in England. By 1723 Gee and his partners owned or controlled more than 12,000 acres of land in North America containing iron ore deposits.

In 1708, Gee and eight other men gave William Penn a mortgage on his Colony of Pennsylvania estate in order to raise money to pay debts. In addition, he was a frequent advisor of the Board of Trade and Plantations.

== Personal life ==
In 1697, Gee married Sarah Hart (1673/4–1704), daughter of a tailor at the Peel Quaker meeting. They had five children, William (b. and d. 1696), Joshua (1697–1777), John (1699–1719?), Mary (1701–1702), and Sarah (1703–1740).

In 1706, two years after Sarah died, Gee married Anna Osgood (d. 1730), widow of Salem Osgood and daughter-in-law of John Osgood, a Quaker silk and linen merchant. Anna had two daughters from her previous marriage, Rebecca (1695–1783) and Anne (b. 1699). They had a further four children; Samuel (1707–1746), Elizabeth (b. 1708), Osgood (b. 1710), and Mary (b. 1713).

Gee died in 1730 at the baths in Hampstead, England.

== Works ==
Gee may have been the author of two other works: An Impartial Enquiry into the Importance and Present State of the Woollen Manufacturers of Great Britain and The Grazier's Advocate, or, Free Thoughts of Wool and the Woollen Trade. Both, works were published posthumously in 1742.

=== The British Merchant (1713–1714) ===
The British Merchant was a journal created by Charles King to oppose the efforts of Viscount Bolingbroke to establish commercial treaty and free trade, between England and France. Gee is believed to have been a contributor to the twice-weekly issues of the journal 1713–1714, where he postulated a mercantile system that emphasized the necessity of government directing and encouraging England's commerce.

==== The Trade and Navigation of Great Britain Consider’d (1729) ====
In 1729, Gee published The Trade and Navigation of Great Britain Consider’d, in London. This book gives an overview of British trade both historically and by national areas, and also comments on trade problems (for example devoting chapter 12 to “French fashions pernicious to England”).

Most of this work focused on labour shortages in the American colonies. Gee suggested that England transport domestic convicts, the poor and unemployed to work in the colonies. He also recommended creating free ports at Gibraltar and Port Mahon. Gee also encouraged foreign import-replacing production in the plantations.

Between 1729 and 1780, at least 20 editions of the book were published. There are English editions published in London, Glasgow, and Dublin, French translations (the first in 1749), published in London, Amsterdam and Geneva, Dutch (1750), Spanish (1753), and German (in Copenhagen, 1757). Historians say that the main reason behind the book's popularity was Gee's honesty explaining the policies which were actually carried out by the English.
