= Baskin High =

Baskin High may refer to:

- A village in Drumraney (civil parish) in the Republic of Ireland
- Baskin High School, a part of Franklin Parish School Board in Louisiana, United States
