= Kilcumreragh =

Civil parish in Leinster, Ireland

Kilcumreragh Cill Chruimthir Fhiachrach
- Civil parish
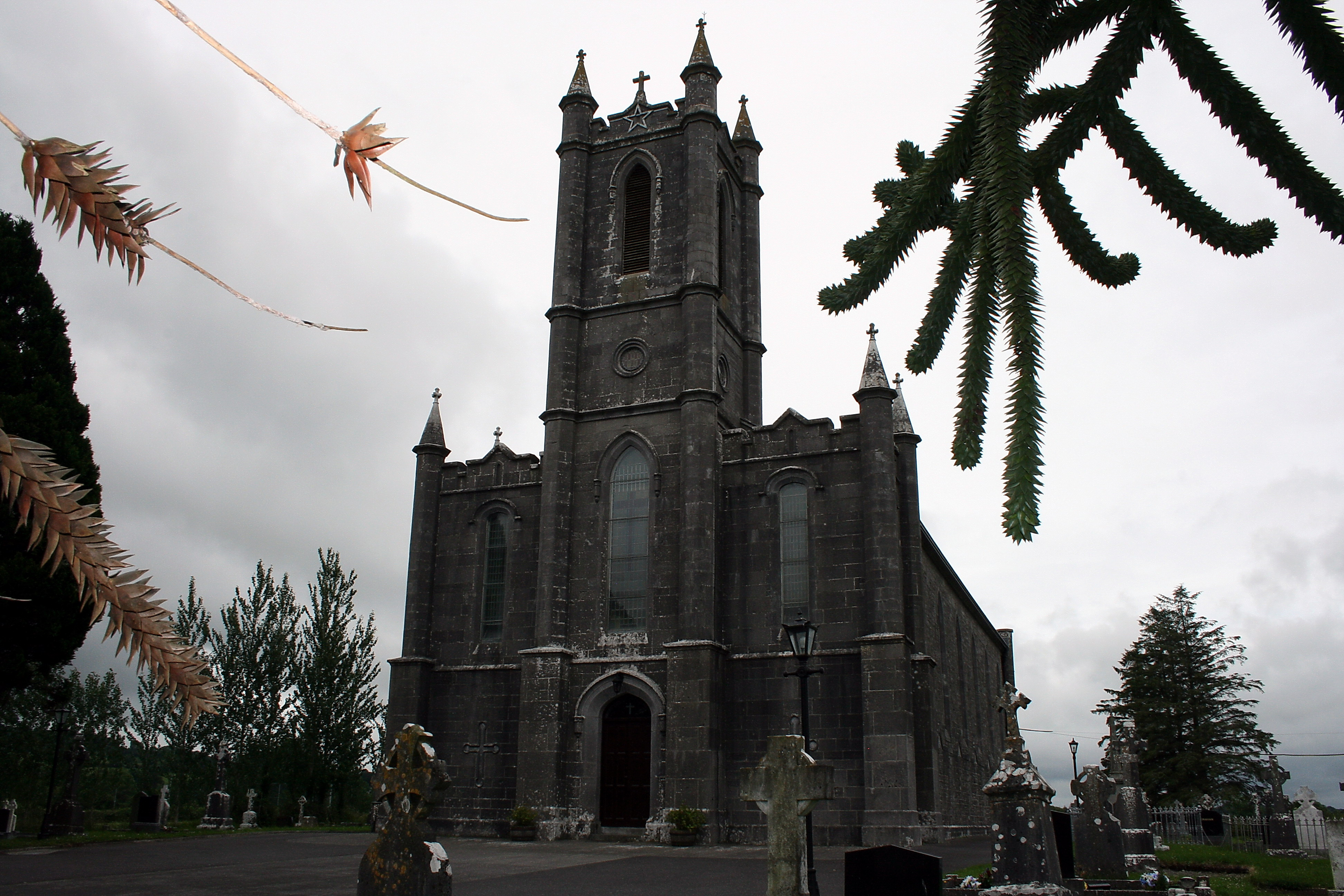
- Church of St Thomas the Apostle, Rosemount

- Location of Kilcumreragh in counties Westmeath and Offaly, Ireland
- Coordinates: 53°24′51″N 7°38′31″W
- Country: Ireland
- Province: Leinster
- County: County Westmeath and County Offaly
- Irish grid reference: N238404

Kilcumreragh (Irish: Cill Chruimthir Fhiachrach) is a civil parish which spans the counties of Westmeath and Offaly in Ireland. It is located about 23 km (14 mi) west–south–west of Mullingar and 18 km (11 mi) north–north–west of Tullamore.

Kilcumreragh also spans three baronies. It is one of 8 civil parishes in the barony of Moycashel (M), 4 civil parishes in the barony of Clonlonan (C) and 4 civil parishes in the Offaly barony of Kilcoursey (K), all in the province of Leinster. The civil parish covers 9,280.6 acres (37.557 km^{2}), 6,964.9 acres (28.186 km^{2}) in County Westmeath and 2,315.7 acres (9.371 km^{2}) in County Offaly.

Kilcumreragh civil parish comprises the village of Rosemount and 32 townlands: Ballagh (C), Ballinderry (C and M), Ballinlig (M), Ballintober (M), Ballybeg (C), Ballybrickoge (M), Ballybroder (C), Ballynagall (M), Ballynagrenia (M), Ballynahinch (K), Brackagh (K), Burrow or Glennanummer (K), Cartron Glebe (K), Coolatoor or Grouselodge (M), Coolatoor (M), Curragh (M), Curraghanana (K), Custorum (M), Derryhall (M), Curraghanana (K), Earlscartron (K), Faheeran (K), Fearboy (K), Feargarrow (K), Grange (M), Grouselodge or Coolatoor (M), Kilcatherina (C), Kilcumeragh (M), Kilmurragh (K), Laragh (M), Lisnagree (M) Newtown and Parkwood (K).

The neighbouring civil parishes are: Killare (barony of Rathconrath) to the north, Ardnurcher or Horseleap to the east, Kilmanaghan (Barony of Clonlonan), Kilcumreragh (County Offaly) and Kilmanaghan (County Offaly) to the south, Ballyloughloe (Clonlonan) to the west and Ballymore (Rathconrath) to the west and north.
