= Kilkenny West =

Barony in County Westmeath, Ireland

Kilkenny West Cill Chainnigh Thiar
- Barony
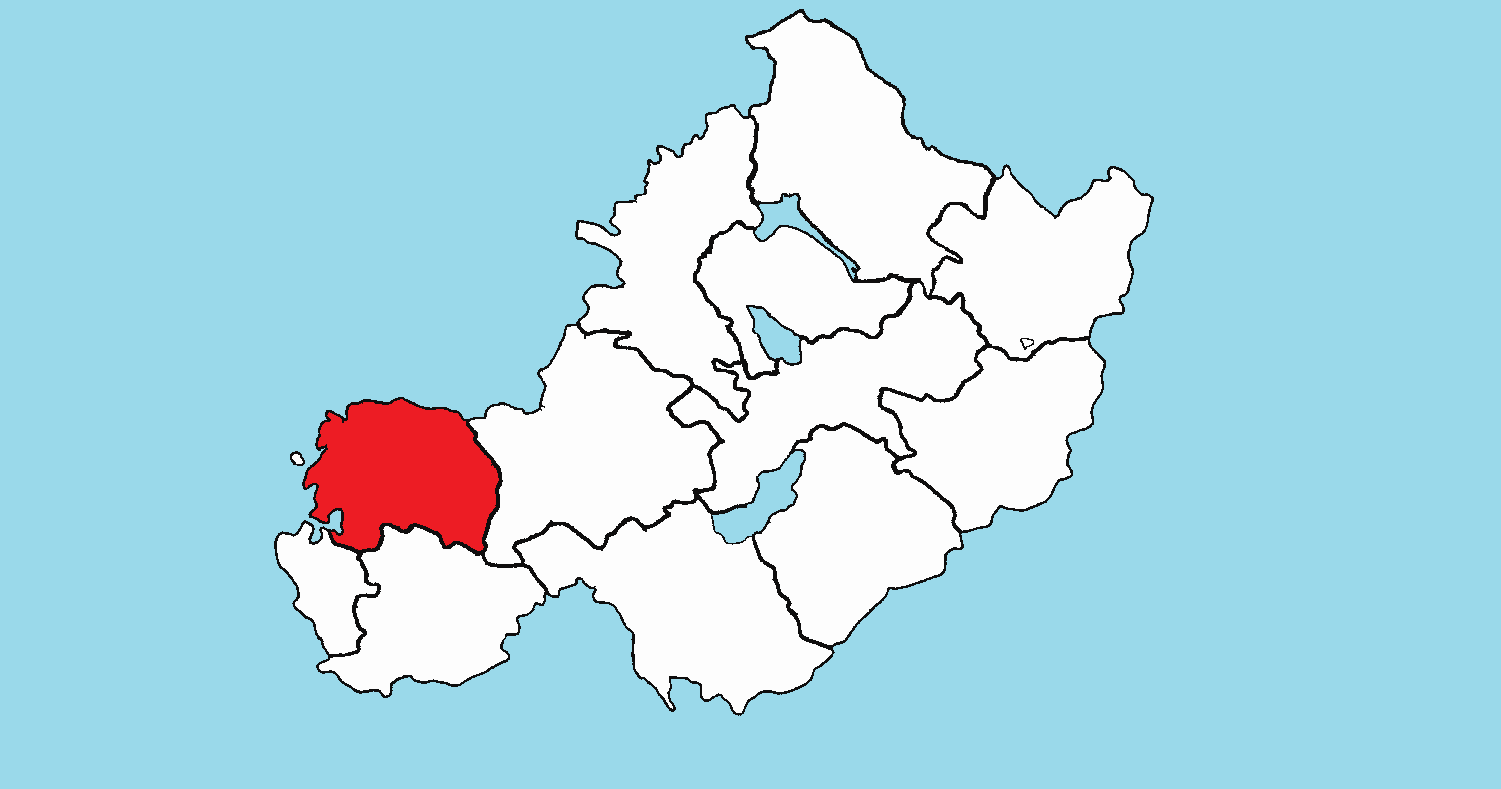
- Location of Kilkenny West on a map of Westmeath

- Location in Ireland
- Coordinates: 53°29′40″N 7°50′07″W
- Country: Ireland
- Province: Leinster
- County: Westmeath

Area
  - Total: 152.4 km^{2} (58.8 sq mi)
- Time zone: UTC+0 (WET)
  - Summer (DST): UTC+1 (IST (WEST))
- Irish Grid Reference: N109493

Kilkenny West (Irish: Cill Chainnigh Thiar), previously Maherquirke or Dillons country, is a barony in west County Westmeath, Ireland. It was formed by 1542. It is bordered by County Longford to the west; it is also bordered by three other Westmeath baronies: Rathconrath (to the east), Brawny (to the south-west) and Clonlonan (to the south-east). The largest centre of population in the barony is the village of Glassan.

== Geography ==
Kilkenny West has an area of 37,651 acres (152.37 km^{2}). The barony contains part of the second largest lake on the River Shannon, Lough Ree. The N55 national secondary road connecting Athlone to Cavan passes through the barony.

== Civil parishes of the barony ==
This table lists an historical geographical sub-division of the barony known as the civil parish (not to be confused with an Ecclesiastical parish).

Name in English	Name in Irish
Bunown	Bun Abhann
Kilkenny West	Cill Chainnigh Thiar
Drumraney	Droim Raithne
Noughaval	Nuachabháil

== Towns, villages and townlands ==
- Ballykeeran, a small village located on the N55 national secondary road north of Athlone.
- Drumraney, a village just off the R390 regional road.
- Glassan also known as the Village of the Roses, a small village 10 km (6.2 mi) north of Athlone, on the N55.

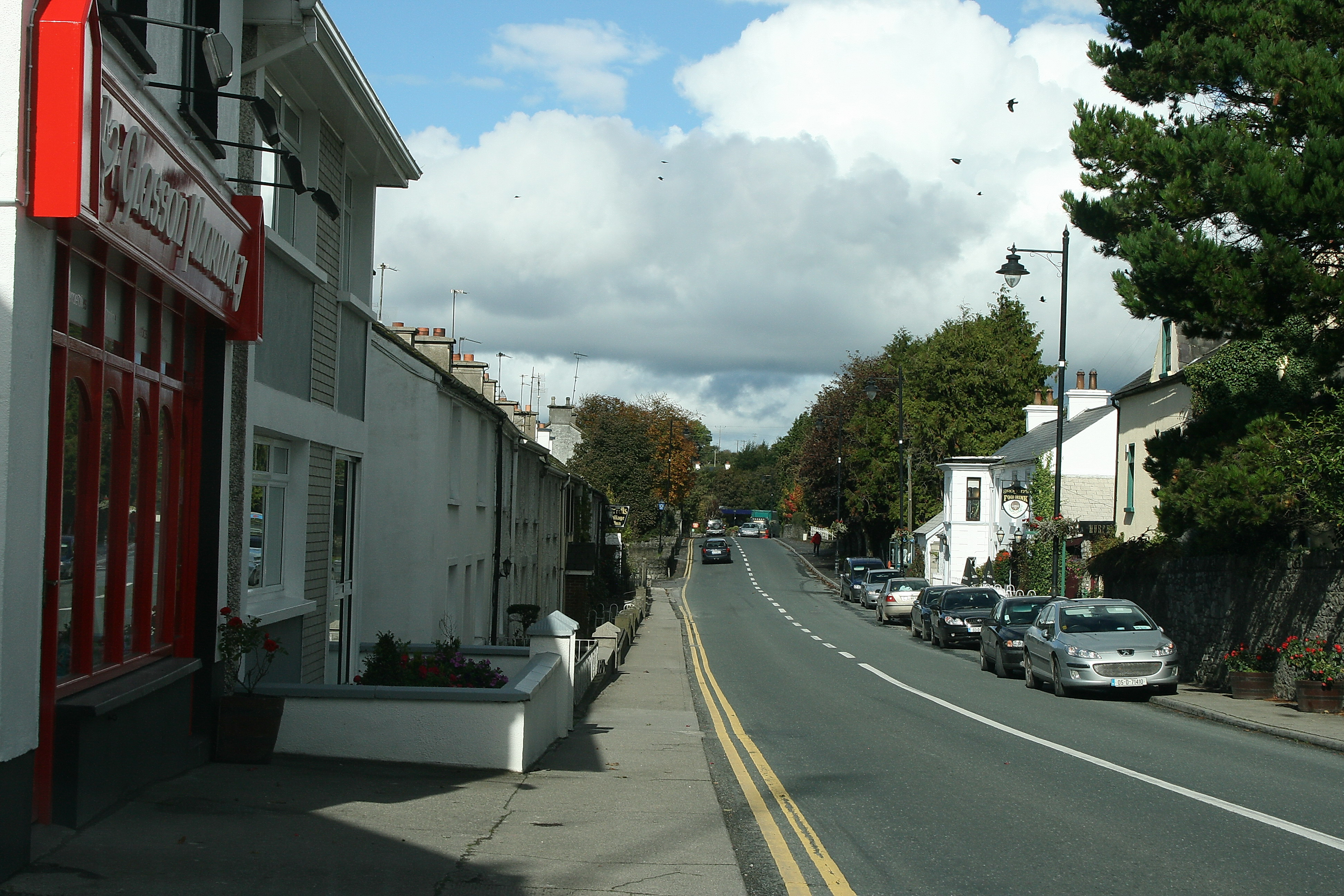
Main St., Glasson

- Tang, a village on the N55 between Athlone and Ballymahon.
- The Pigeons, an area on the N55 between Tubberclare and Tang.
- Tubberclare, a large parish and townland, 9 km (6 mi) from Athlone, on the N55.

There are 136 townlands in the barony of Kilkenny West.
