= Beinn a' Bhathaich Àrd =

Mountain on the northern side of Glen Strathfarrar, in the Highlands of Scotland

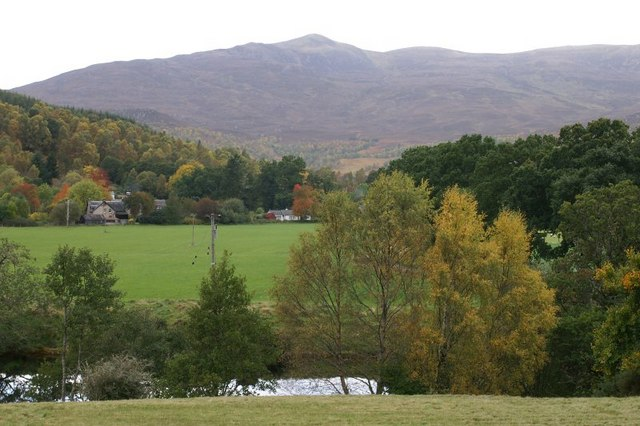
- View of Beinn a' Bhathaich Àrd from near Struy

Highest point
- Elevation: 862 m (2,828 ft)
- Prominence: 241 m (791 ft)
- Listing: Marilyn, Corbett
- Coordinates: 57°27′07″N 4°44′02″W

Naming
- English translation: Mountain of the high byre
- Language of name: Gaelic

Geography
- Location within Highland Location within the United Kingdom
- Location: Highland, Scotland
- Parent range: Northwest Highlands
- OS grid: NH 36061 43474
- Topo map: OS Landranger 26, Explorer 431

Beinn a' Bhathaich Àrd is mountain on the northern side of Glen Strathfarrar, in the Highlands of Scotland. It is situated at the eastern end of the glen, 5 km north-west of the village of Struy, and 16 km west of Beauly. Though not the highest hill in Strathfarrar, its position at the end of the glen makes it visible for some distance around. It is a prominent landmark from much of The Aird, Inverness and the Kessock Bridge.

Beinn a' Bhathaich Àrd is usually climbed from the hamlet of Inchmore, at the foot of Strathfarrar.
