= Kilmanaghan (civil parish) =

Civil parish in County Westmeath, Ireland

Kilmanaghan Cill Mhancháin
- Civil parish
- Location of Kilmanaghan within the counties of Offaly and Westmeath in Ireland
- Coordinates: 53°22′55″N 7°41′17″W
- Country: Ireland
- Province: Leinster
- County: County Westmeath and County Offaly
- Irish grid reference: N208368

Kilmanaghan (Irish: Cill Mhancháin, meaning 'Manchan’s church') is a civil parish which spans the counties of Offaly and Westmeath in Ireland. It is located about 28 km (17 mi) south–west of Mullingar and 18 km (11 mi) north–west of Tullamore.

== Geography ==
Kilmanaghan is one of four civil parishes in the barony of Clonlonan (Westmeath) and 4 civil parishes in the barony of Kilcoursey (Offaly), both in the province of Leinster. The civil parish covers 8,204.5 acres (33.202 km^{2}), 1,635.1 acres (6.617 km^{2}) in County Westmeath and 6,569.4 acres (26.585 km^{2}) in County Offaly.

Kilmanaghan civil parish comprises the town of Moate, 10 townlands in County Westmeath and 22 townlands in County Offaly.

The neighbouring civil parishes are: Ballyloughloe and Kilcumreragh to the north, Ardnurcher or Horseleap and Kilbride to the east, Lemanaghan and Rahan to the south and Kilcleagh to the west.
