= Ríoch =

Irish Christian missionary and Saint

Ríoch, early Irish Christian missionary and Saint, fl. 490.

== Biography ==
Ríoch or Moríóg operated in the extreme west of Conmhaicne Mara, in what is now County Galway. Surviving traditions state that he was a nephew of Saint Patrick, the son of Patrick's sister, Darerca. Rioch was brother to Mél of Ardagh.

Ríoch and his brothers accompanied Patrick to Ireland to help him with his missionary work there. Rioch is said to have founded a monastery on Inchbofin in Lough Ree in AD 530. His relics may lie in Salruck cemetery of Little Killary harbour. Some scholoars, however, believe this to be associated with another saint called Roc.

His settlements include Oileán Dá Chruinne, Oileán na Naoinri and Oileán an Bhaile Bhig (the three Crump islands), off the southern mouth of Killary Harbour. Oilean Da Chruinne contains the remains of a simple, early Christian oratory on the island's south side, which Ríoch is said to have built. To the immediate east of the church is a small cemetery containing several very ancient headstones, traditionally held to be the graves of forty strangers who accompanied Ríoch from overseas. Their identity is obscure but they are invoked in the Litany of Óengus of Tallaght, dating from the 8th century.

== See also ==
- Macdara
- Leo of Inis Airc
- Conainne
- Seven Sisters of Renvyle

== Sources ==
- A Guide to Connemara's Early Christian Sites, Anthony Previté, Oughterard, 2008. ISBN 978 0 9560062 0 2
