= Kilkenny West (civil parish) =

Civil parish in County Westmeath, Ireland

Kilkenny West Cill Chainnigh
- Civil parish
- Location of Kilkenny West within County Westmeath in Ireland
- Coordinates: 53°29′15″N 7°51′6″W
- Country: Ireland
- Province: Leinster
- County: County Westmeath
- Irish grid reference: N098485

Kilkenny West (Irish: Cill Chainnigh) is a civil parish in County Westmeath, Ireland. It is located about 33.81 kilometres (21 mi) west of Mullingar.

Kilkenny West is one of 4 civil parishes in the barony of Kilkenny West in the Province of Leinster. The civil parish covers 10,030.3 acres (40.591 km^{2}).

Kilkenny West civil parish comprises the village of Glassan and 45 townlands: Annagh, Auburn, Ballaghkeeran Big, Ballaghkeeran Little, Ballyboy Lowpark, Ballynacliffy, Ballynakill, Ballynakill Upper, Bethlehem, Bleanphuttoge, Boardsland, Brittas, Caplahard, Carrickfin, Cartronkeel, Corr, Creevenmanagh, Deerpark, Farrannamoreen, Fortyacres, Glassan, Kilfaughny, Kilkenny Abbey, Kilkenny Lanesborough, Kilkenny West, Lackan, Lisdachon, Lisnascreen, Lissatunny, Lissoy, Littletown, Lowpark Ballyboy, Lurgan, Magheracuirknagh, Pearsonsbrook, Portaneena, Rath, Temple's Island, Toberclare, Tobernagauhoge, Tonagh, Tullaghan, Tullyhogan, Tullyhumphrys, Tullylanesborough and Waterstown

The neighbouring civil parishes are: Shrule (County Longford) to the north, Noughaval to the north–east, Drumraney to the east, Ballyloughloe and St. Mary's to the south, Bunown to the west and Noughaval to the north–west.
