= Nuala Holloway =

Irish school teacher (born 1956)

- Born: 18 December 1956 (age 69); Mount Temple, County Westmeath, Ireland
- Website: www.nualaholloway.com

Nuala Holloway (formerly known as Nuala Holloway-Casey) (born 18 December, circa 1956) is an Irish artist, teacher, journalist and former actress, model and beauty pageant titleholder who was crowned Miss Ireland International 1975.

== Personal life ==
Holloway is from Mount Temple, County Westmeath in Ireland. She completed secondary school at the Convent of Mercy in Moate, County Westmeath, now known as Moate Community School. Holloway received a Bachelor of Arts from University College Dublin (UCD) in modern and medieval Irish in 2004. She also received a BA in history of art, Italian and English from UCD. In 2005, she completed her higher diploma in education as well as a qualification in teaching English as a foreign language (TEFL). In 2021 Nuala received a Master's Degree In Teaching Chinese Language and Culture from UCD. She works mainly as a secondary school teacher, teaching Irish, English and Chinese and also as a visual artist.

== Modelling ==
Shortly after completing secondary school, Holloway became a fashion and photographic model. She gained praise and attention in the late 1970s and 1980s for her work. She appeared in magazines and newspapers, both in Ireland and abroad. In 1975 after winning the Miss Westmeath competition, she represented her country at Miss International 1975. She is the only native of County Westmeath to become Miss Ireland.

== Acting ==
Holloway appeared in films, stage plays, television dramas and Ads. She has performed in The Focus Theatre in Dublin.

In 1978, Holloway appeared in The First Great Train Robbery with Sean Connery. She also worked as a double for actress Lesley-Anne Down. She worked in "The Flame Is Love", "The Year Of The French", "The Death of our Angels" and "Tailor Made".

She acted with Gabriel Byrne in Bracken and with Pierce Brosnan in Manions of America. She also appeared in Silver Apples of The Moon, Anois is Arís and played Sister Concepta on The Live Mike.

Her stage career includes performances such as Sauce for The Goose (with RTÉ Players, Gaiety Theatre), Meeting of the Ladies Club, The Importance of Being Earnest, Living Quarters by Brian Friel, The Love Of The Nightingale by Timberlake Wertenbaker - she played the part of The Queen at Players Theatre, Trinity College, Dublin, The Death of Cuchalainn by W. B. Yeats - played lead part at the North American Theatre Festival in Milwaukee.

== Art ==
Holloway works mainly as an impressionist using oils, watercolours, pastel, pencil and oils on a variety of subject matter, including wildlife, landscape, maritime and portraiture. She originally studied at the Crawford College of Art, Cork but abandoned these studies when she was encouraged to become a model by photographer Ted McCarthy. However, her interest in painting was revived later on. She studied under Kay Doyle, President of the Watercolour Society of Ireland. This led to a number of noted solo and collaborative art exhibitions.

In November 1997, Holloway's painting "Coming Out of the wood - Seve Ballesteros" was chosen from 300 entries for the Dún Laoghaire / Rathdown Open Exhibition of 30 artists. In April 1998, two of her paintings were chosen for the Dún Laoghaire exhibition - "Asgard II" and "Dun Laoghaire Harbour". This work was singled out for special mention by the Administrator of the Crawford Gallery, Cork. His comment was "An Artist of exceptional talent". Since then Holloway has completed a number of commissions and her work is now in private collections in Ireland, Britain and America.

In August 2006, she co-exhibited a selection of her art work with the poetry of writer, poet and Joycean scholar Leo Daly in Mullingar. This was followed in September 2006, when Holloway returned to her home town for her first solo exhibition, "Inspirations", which was opened by writer and artist Don Conroy and Vera Hughes, a local historian. This was followed by an invitation to exhibit her work in Arklow in the summer of 2007.

In December 2007, her first solo Dublin exhibition took place at Airfield House, Dundrum. The exhibition, entitled "Reflections", was opened by Eoghan Harris who highlighted and celebrated Holloway's draughtsmanship. He also referred to her as "the Nigella Lawson of Irish artists", referring to the force and energy in her work, and the glamour of the artist herself. In November, 2008 Holloway held an art exhibition with another former Miss Ireland, Jakki Moore, in Dún Laoghaire. The exhibition, entitled "The Magical World of Maritime", was a celebration of coral. Holloway and Moore collaborated once again in December 2011 at the Sol Art Gallery in Dublin. The exhibition, entitled "Moments", was opened by Hollywood director and animator Jimmy Murakami.

Other noted works by Holloway include portraits of Irish President Mary McAleese, golfers Pádraig Harrington and Seve Ballesteros and American singer Elvis Presley, which was commissioned for the cover of the book "Elvis and Ireland".

During the summer of 2011, the United States Embassy in Dublin accepted an oil painting entitled "Famine Ship - Jeanie Johnston" by Holloway to be presented to President Barack Obama during his 2011 visit to Ireland. She subsequently received a letter of gratitude from the President for her gift.

== Journalism ==
As a journalist Nuala has worked freelance writing articles on education, history, folklore and current affairs for print media including the Irish language newspaper An Páipéar, The Irish Times, The Sunday Independent, The Westmeath Independent, Ireland's Own and Ireland's Eye.
