= Dunnamona =

Motte-and-bailey in Ireland

- Dún na Móna (Irish)
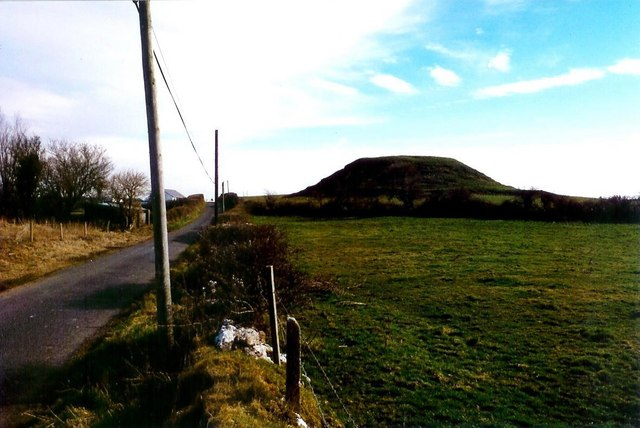

- Location within Ireland
- 53.499548°N 7.783629°W
- Type: motte
- Periods: Norman Ireland
- Cultures: Cambro-Norman, Old English
- Location: Dunnamona, Drumraney, County Westmeath, Ireland
- Region: Tethbae

History
- Built: 12th century
- Built by: Dillon family

Site notes
- Material: earth
- Height: 9 metres (30 ft)
- Diameter: 36 m (118 ft)
- Public access: yes

National monument of Ireland
- Official name: Dunnamona
- Reference no.: 560

Dunnamona is a motte-and-bailey and National Monument in County Westmeath, Ireland.

== Location ==
Dunnamona motte is located next to a tributary of the Owenacharra River, 4.7 km (2.9 mi) east of Tubberclare.

== History and archaeology ==
Motte-and-bailey castles were a primitive type of castle built by the Norman invasion, a mound of earth topped by a wooden palisade. This region, known as Tethbae, was allotted to the Dillon family, descendants of Sir Henry de Leon (c. 1176 – 1244). They built the motte at Dunnamona ("hillfort of peat") as well as another at Drumraney, later abandoning the mottes for permanent stone castles.
