= Drumraney (civil parish) =

Civil parish in County Westmeath, Ireland

Drumraney Droim Raithne
- Civil parish
- Location of Drumraney in County Westmeath, Ireland
- Coordinates: 53°28′19″N 7°45′34″W
- Country: Ireland
- Province: Leinster
- County: County Westmeath
- Irish grid reference: N160468

Drumraney (Irish: Droim Raithne) is a civil parish in County Westmeath, Ireland. It is located about 28 km (17 mi) west of Mullingar.

Drumraney is one of 4 civil parishes in the barony of Kilkenny West in the province of Leinster. The civil parish covers 9,108.5 acres (36.861 km^{2}).

Drumraney civil parish comprises the village of Drumraney and 40 townlands: Ardborra, Ardbuckan, Ardnagragh, Ardnagragh Digby, Ardnagragh Gray, Ballycloghduff, Ballycloghduff (Molston), Ballynalone, Ballysallagh, Baskin High, Baskin Low, Bleachlawn, Bryanmore Lower, Bryanmore Upper, Byanbeg Lower, Byanbeg Upper, Carrickaneha, Cartroncoragh, Cauran, Cloghbreen, Cormaclew, Corr, Curraghbane, Curraghroodle, Drumraney, Dunnamona, Fairfield, Fearmore, Kilcornan, Killeennanam, Killininneen, Kiltober, Lissanode, Newgrove, Oldtown or Puddingstreet, Pishanagh, Streamstown, Toorbeg and Walderstown.

The neighbouring civil parishes are: Noughaval to the north, Ballymore to the east, Ballyloughloe to the south and Kilkenny West to the west.
