= Inchmore, County Westmeath =

Island in County Westmeath, Ireland

Inchmore is an island and townland located in Lough Ree in County Westmeath, Ireland. It is in the civil parish of Bunown.

The island, which consists of 132 acres, is the largest in Lough Ree. A ring fort is located at the south end.

The island is now uninhabited, however a ruined monastery attributed to St. Lioban (or Liberius), the son of Lossenus shows evidence of previous habitation.

The island is split between two townlands, with the eastern side being Inchmore (Tiernan).
