= Bunown (civil parish) =

Civil parish in County Westmeath, Ireland

Bunown Bun Abhann
- Civil parish
- Location of Bunown within County Westmeath, Ireland
- Coordinates: 53°29′18″N 7°55′4″W
- Country: Ireland
- Province: Leinster
- County: County Westmeath
- Irish grid reference: N055486

Bunown (Irish: Bun Abhann) is a civil parish in County Westmeath, Ireland. It is located about 38 km (24 mi) west of Mullingar.

Bunown is one of 4 civil parishes in the barony of Kilkenny West in the province of Leinster. The civil parish covers 6,867.1 acres (27.790 km^{2}).

Bunown civil parish comprises 18 townlands: Ballinlough, Bunown, Garnagh Island, Glassan, Glebe, Hareisland, Inchmore, Inchmore (Tiernan), Killeenmore, Killinure North, Killinure South, Lissakillen North, Lissakillen South, Nuns Island, Portlick, Rooan, Skeanaveane and Whinning.

The neighbouring civil parish is: Kilkenny West to the east.
