= Inchmore (Tiernan) =

Townland in County Westmeath, Ireland

Inchmore (Tiernan) is a townland located on the island of Inchmore in Lough Ree in County Westmeath, Ireland. It is in the civil parish of Bunown.

The Townland is named after a local family that once inhabited the island. The island is split between two townlands, with the west being Inchmore.
