= Raharney Ringfort =

- Ráth Fhearna • Ráth Athairne (Irish)
- Location within Ireland
- 53.521689°N 7.104459°W
- Type: ringfort
- Cultures: Gaelic Ireland
- Location: Raharney, County Westmeath, Ireland

Site notes
- Material: earth
- Elevation: 83 m (272 ft)
- Height: 3 m (9.8 ft)
- Area: 0.17 ha (0.42 acres)
- Diameter: 39 m (128 ft)
- Owner: private

National monument of Ireland
- Official name: Raherney
- Reference no.: 572

Raharney Ringfort is a ringfort located in County Westmeath, Ireland and a National Monument.

== Location ==
Raharney Ringfort is located immediately west of Raharney village, just south of the R156.

== History ==
Raths were ancient circular fortified settlements or homesteads in Gaelic Ireland (i.e. prior to 1170). The name is from the Irish Ráth Fhearna (ringfort of alder) or Ráth Athairne (ringfort of Athirne, a mythical poet).

== Description ==
The rath is relatively small, covering 0.17 ha (0.42 acres). it is visible today as a slight hill in the middle of a field, covered in trees.
