= Inchmore, Strathfarrar =

Coordinates: 57.42989°N 4.66919°W

Inchmore
- Location within the Inverness area
- OS grid reference: NH398408
- Council area: Highland
- Country: Scotland
- Sovereign state: United Kingdom
- Post town: Kiltarlity
- Postcode district: IV4 7
- Police: Scotland
- Fire: Scottish
- Ambulance: Scottish

Inchmore is a small hamlet at the foot of Glen Strathfarrar, in Inverness-shire in the Scottish Highlands of Scotland. It is situated 1 km (0.62 mi) north west of Struy, and 14 km (8.7 mi) southwest of Beauly, and in the Highland council area. It is on the north bank of the River Farrar, and is the location of a locked gate that restricts access along the private road up the glen. Inchmore is the usual starting point for climbing Beinn a' Bhathaich Àrd, a Corbett to the north west.
