= Creeve =

Creeve An Chraobh
- Civil Parish
- Location within Ireland
- Coordinates: 53°52′31″N 8°11′21″W
- Country: Ireland
- County: County Roscommon

Area
  - Total: 2.7695 km^{2} (1.0693 sq mi)

Creeve is a civil parish and townland in County Roscommon, Ireland. According to Samuel Lewis' A Topographical Dictionary of Ireland, published in 1837, it then had a population of 3,159.

== Formation ==
Creeve contains 22 townlands: Assaun, Attiaghygrana, Ballyhollaghan, Ballysundrivan, Boherroe, Carrownamaddy, Cartron, Castletown, Corbally East, Corbally Middle, Corbally West, Corgarve, Creevolan, Erriblagh, Lecarrow, Lismageevoge, Martry, Moheedian, Portobello, Rathardeagher, Runnateggal / Ryefield, and Turlagh.
