= Raharney =

Village in County Westmeath, Ireland

Raharney Irish: Ráth Fhearna
- Village
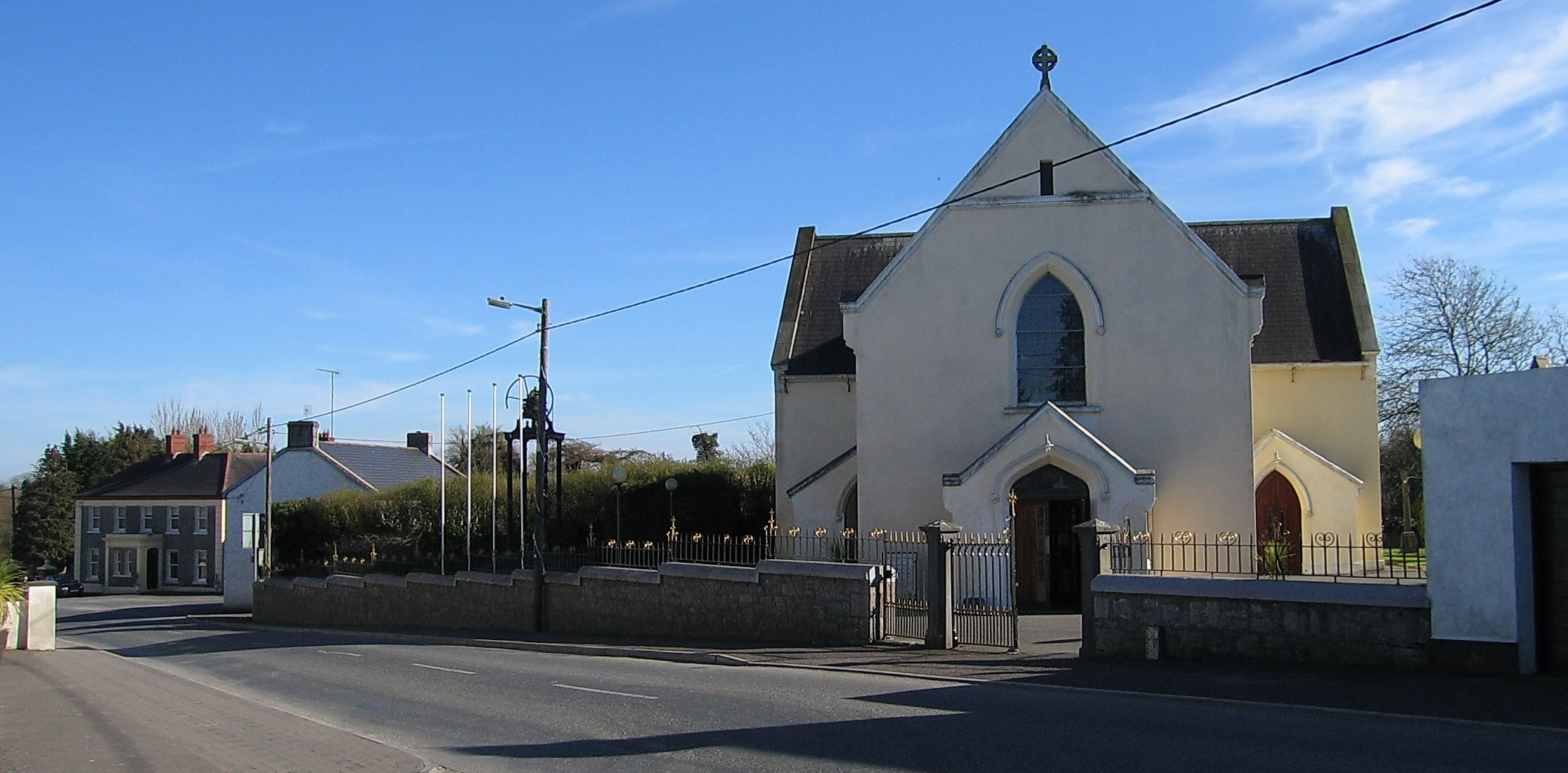
- Raharney Main Street

- Location in Ireland
- Coordinates: 53.524°N 7.095°W
- Country: Ireland
- Province: Leinster
- County: County Westmeath
- Elevation: 75 m (246 ft)

Population (2016)
  - Total: 221
- Irish Grid Reference: N599531

Raharney (Irish: Ráth Fhearna, meaning 'Fearna's ringfort' or 'ringfort of the alders') is a village in east County Westmeath, Ireland. It had a population of 221 according to the 2016 census.

Raharney is on the R156 road about 18 km (11 mi) from Mullingar and about 67 km from Dublin. It is in the parish of Killucan; the village of Killucan is a further 3 km (1.9 mi) west.

== Geography ==
The village of Raharney has a bridge over the River Deel and is the last settlement of the county on the edge of bogland that separates Westmeath from County Meath. The bridge links the roads that run north–south alongside the River Deel on one side and alongside the bog on the other (road from Delvin and on through Riverdale). The River Deel is a tributary of the Boyne. The roads into the village all slope down towards the river, suggesting that before the bridge was built there was a ford at this point. Looking westward to Mullingar the town is located in the gap between three large lakes. Raharney, therefore, lies on the route of a path of what probably was, in the past, difficult terrain through the midlands. The three east–west roads were the Athboy-Delvin-Mullingar road, the Clonard-Kinnegad-Athlone/Mullingar road and Trim-Raharney/Killucan-Mullingar road.

== History ==
Evidence of ancient settlement in the area includes a number of ringfort and bullaun sites in the townlands of Raharney, Raharney Little, Cloghanstown and Joristown Upper. Raharney Ringfort, protected under the National Monuments Act, is National Monument number 572.

There is an old, unused graveyard, located on top of a small hill on the bend of the river as it leaves the village. This ecclesiastical enclosure, in Grange Beg townland, is known locally as Kilcolumb church and graveyard.

Within the village is a Catholic church dedicated to St. Brigid. This church, built c. 1834, is in the Roman Catholic Diocese of Meath.

== Public transport ==
Bus Éireann route 115A provides a commuter link to Dublin via Ballivor, Summerhill and Maynooth with one journey in the morning and an evening journey back Mondays to Fridays inclusive. Until August 2013, Bus Éireann route 118 provided a daily commuter service to Dublin and Mullingar.

== Sport ==
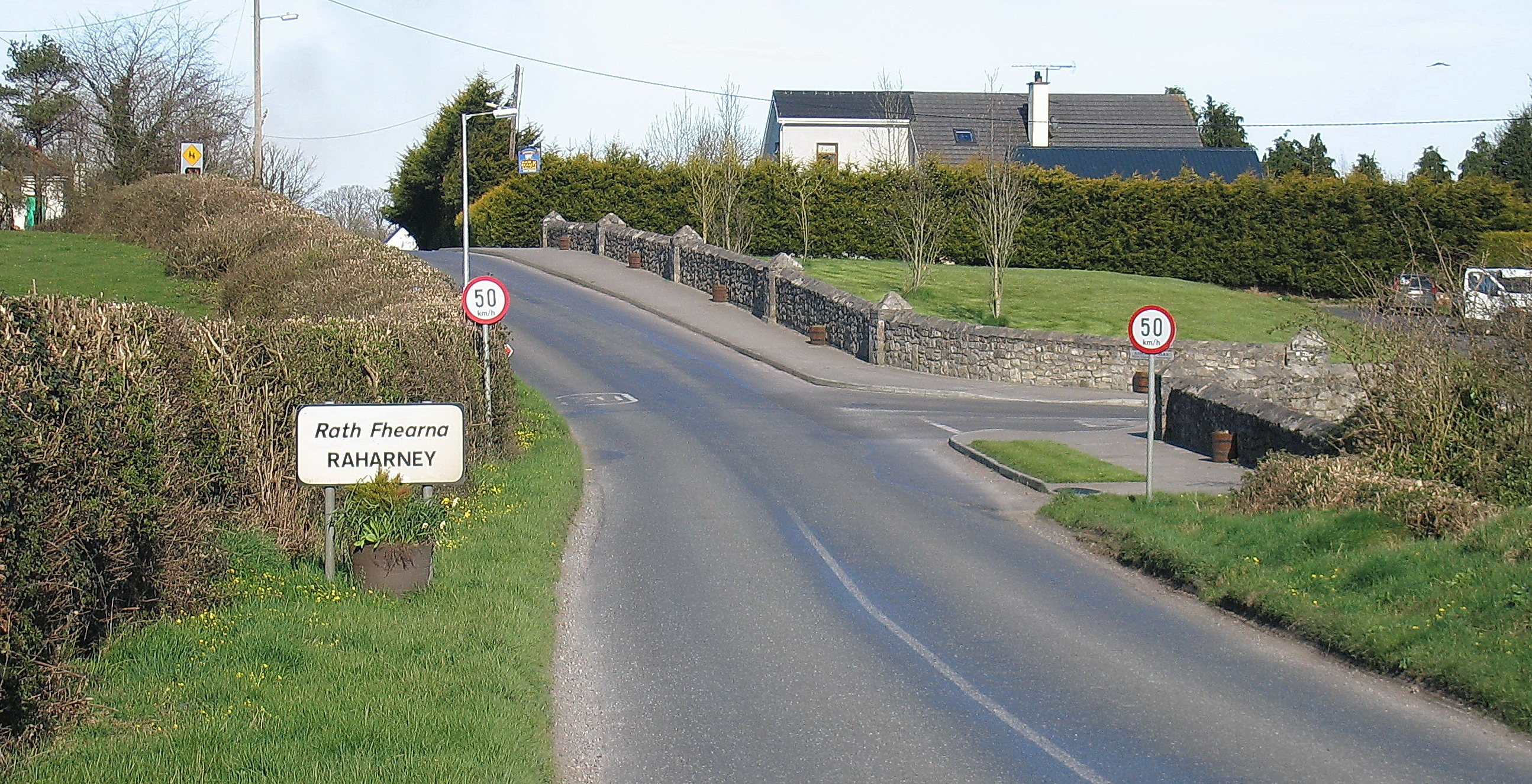
Raharney on the R156

Raharney Hurling Club is the local parish Gaelic Athletic Association club, and has won the Westmeath Senior Hurling Championship on fifteen occasions. The club's camogie team has won the Westmeath camogie final several times, including a "10-in-a-row" streak from 2015 to 2025.

== See also ==
- List of towns and villages in Ireland
