= Mount Temple, County Westmeath =

Village in County Westmeath, Ireland

Mount Temple An Ghrianán
- Village
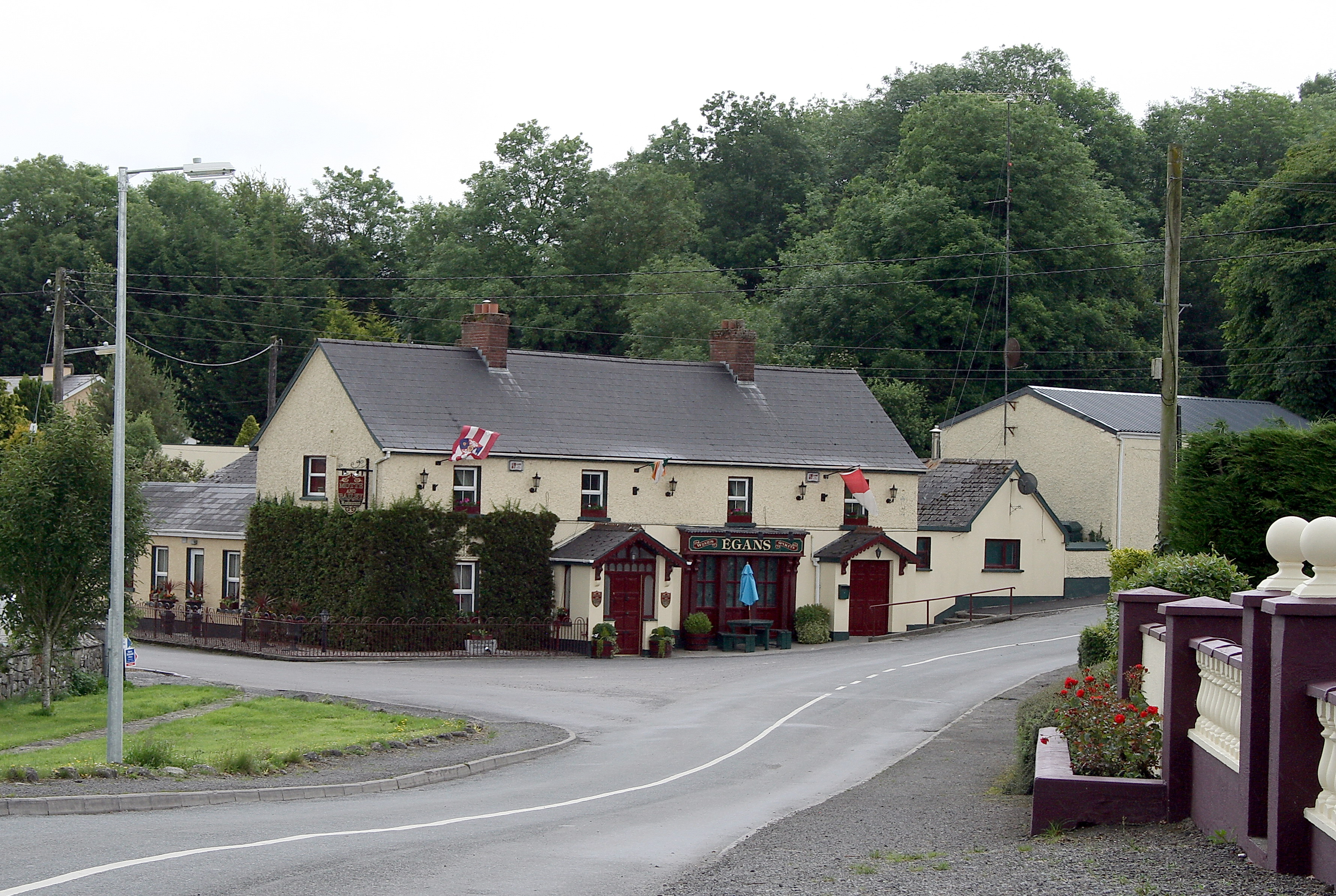
- Village pub and restaurant

- Location in Ireland
- Coordinates: 53.427997°N 7.776694°W
- Country: Ireland
- Province: Leinster
- County: County Westmeath
- Dáil Éireann: Longford–Westmeath
- Irish Grid Reference: N182383

Mount Temple (Irish: an Grianán) is a village in County Westmeath in Ireland, about 6.5 km northwest of Moate. It is noted for its golf course of the same name. It was historically called Ballyloughloe. Mount Temple, along with its sister village Baylin (or Baelin), are the only two villages in the civil parish of Ballyloughloe.

== History ==
In ancient times, Mount Temple and its hinterland formed part of the kingdom of the High King of Uisneach at Killare. The area of South Westmeath and Longford was conquered by Niall of the Nine Hostages circa AD 400 and formed the kingdom of Teathbha (anglicized as Teffia). An area roughly the present-day parish of Ballyloughloe was granted to his son, Maine, and was known as the Calraighre an Chalaidh, hence the name Caulry. It was ruled by Maine's descendants for the next 1,200 years. They were the MacAmhalgaidhe (anglicised as Magawley or sometimes McAuley) and were referred to as the Lords of Carlee in old manuscripts. The chieftain of their clan was inaugurated on a coronation site known as Tullymagawley, in the townland of Ballymurray.

The Hanevys, Geraghtys, and Flynns are clans closely associated with the Magawleys, residing in the area. The principal neighbouring clans were the Melaghlins (in Moate and Farnagh), Foxes (East Moate), Dillons (Kilkenny West), the O'Dalys and O'Malones (Castledaly) and the O'Braoins (East Athlone).

Tradition records that Saint Patrick visited the area in the 5th century but was given a hostile reception in Caulry. He escaped to Annagh and on to Ballykeeran, where he is reputed to have placed a curse on the people of Caulry. Saint Ciarán has strong associations with the area, having founded a church called Iseal Chiarán in Baylin. The Baylin High Cross (circa AD 800) originates from this site. A Franciscan Abbey and a Saint Clare's Nunnery were located in the townland of Monksland, but they were abandoned following Henry VIII's dissolution of the monasteries.

The Normans arrived in Ireland, via Wexford in 1171 and, following a rapid conquest, arrived in this locality, led by the Tuites in 1180. They were responsible for the construction of a motte and bailey on top of an existing esker, the Garbh Esker that runs from the east to the village. Other Normans arrived under the Tuite's leadership, and many of those surnames remain in the area such as Nugents, Ledwiths, Daltons, Tyrrells, Pettits, and Brownes. The Magawleys were never driven from the area, and they regained control from the Tuites by 1362.

The Magawleys strengthened their position by building five castles, the principal one being at Ballyloughloe (adjacent to the present-day Mount Temple Golf Club). Other castles were at Creeve, at Carn, at Dunegan, and at Magheramore. These castles are in ruins today. Dunegan Castle was occupied by the Homans up to 1825, when it was maliciously burnt down. Two Curley brothers were found guilty of the arson and subsequently hung at Dunegan. Many locals believed that the brothers were innocent; one hypothesis is that the fire started accidentally due to a nearby haystack that caught fire. Much of the walls of Dunegan castle remained intact until the 1940s, but Westmeath County Council decided to take a large section of it down to use the stone to build the nearby road.

The county of Westmeath was created in 1542 by dividing what was once the ancient province of Midhe (Meath) into eastern and western counties. The Barony of Clonlonan, which includes the parish of Ballyloughloe, was incorporated into Westmeath in 1600, when the Gaelic clans of Melaghlin and Magawley finally submitted to English law.

The Magawley's control in the area finally ceased following the infamous Cromwellian campaign throughout Ireland in 1652. The last Magawley chief, Henry Magawley, his wife Margaret and mother Jane, were transplanted with many Caulry natives to Connacht in 1656. His family eventually resettled back to Kilcormac in County Offaly. Some Magawleys were fortunate to remain in the area, but many more Magawleys went on to join the Wild Geese into the service of other European nations. One such descendant was Philip Magawley, who served as Field Marshal in the Army of Emperor Charles IV and later was Governor of Prague in 1740. Another was Philip Francis Magawley, 3rd Count Magawley-Cerati de Calry, who died in 1835. He was appointed a Papal Ambassador of Pope Pius VIII to Napoleon in 1814. He also served as prime minister to Empress Marie Louise, Duchess of Parma. Christopher Henry Magawley was a Governor of Riga and a Knight of the Russian Empire.

Following the Cromwellian land confiscations, Robert Temple purchased much of the lands of the area in 1684 and established the Temple family as the local gentry. His daughter, Elizabeth Temple, famously rode her horse up the Norman motte and by doing so, the village became known as "Mount Temple". Elizabeth Temple married Gustavus Handcock of Waterstown Estate, Glasson in 1725. Both are buried at Saint Mary's Church, Athlone. Their descendants became the lords and ladies of Castlemaine, residing at Moydrum Castle, Baylin. The Irish Republican Army militia burnt down their magnificent stately home in 1921. This was a reprisal attack for the burning of a number of farmhouses in Coosan by British Crown forces earlier that day.

The immediate vicinity was known as Ballyloughloe, derived from Loch Luatha, a lakelet near the golf club. Luatha is reputed to have been a Gaelic queen who bled to death at the lakeside. An Grianán is thought to have been an elevated area surrounding a hillfort that is still preserved today on the golf course. In the late 1960s, an unsuccessful political campaign was undertaken to revert the name of the village to Ballyloughloe. Today, there is often slight confusion about the actual name of the parish, with some locals referring to it incorrectly as Mount Temple, possibly because the local church is situated in the village. Officially, the name of the parish is Ballyloughloe with the village of Mount Temple forming its core.

In 1832, a national school was opened in Mount Temple. A new national school was built in 1888 in the building that today houses our local community centre. The present national school, An Grianán National School, was opened in 1964.

The local Gaelic Athletic Association (GAA) club, Caulry, was founded in 1928 by Father Francis Skelly in an effort to bring all sections of the community together in one unified organization. The club retains the ancient territorial name of the Magawleys. Caulry GAA, represents the locality in Gaelic Football, Camogie and Scór. The local association football club, Temple Villa, was founded in 1973, whilst the Mount Temple Golf Club was established in 1991.

== Corpus Christi Church ==
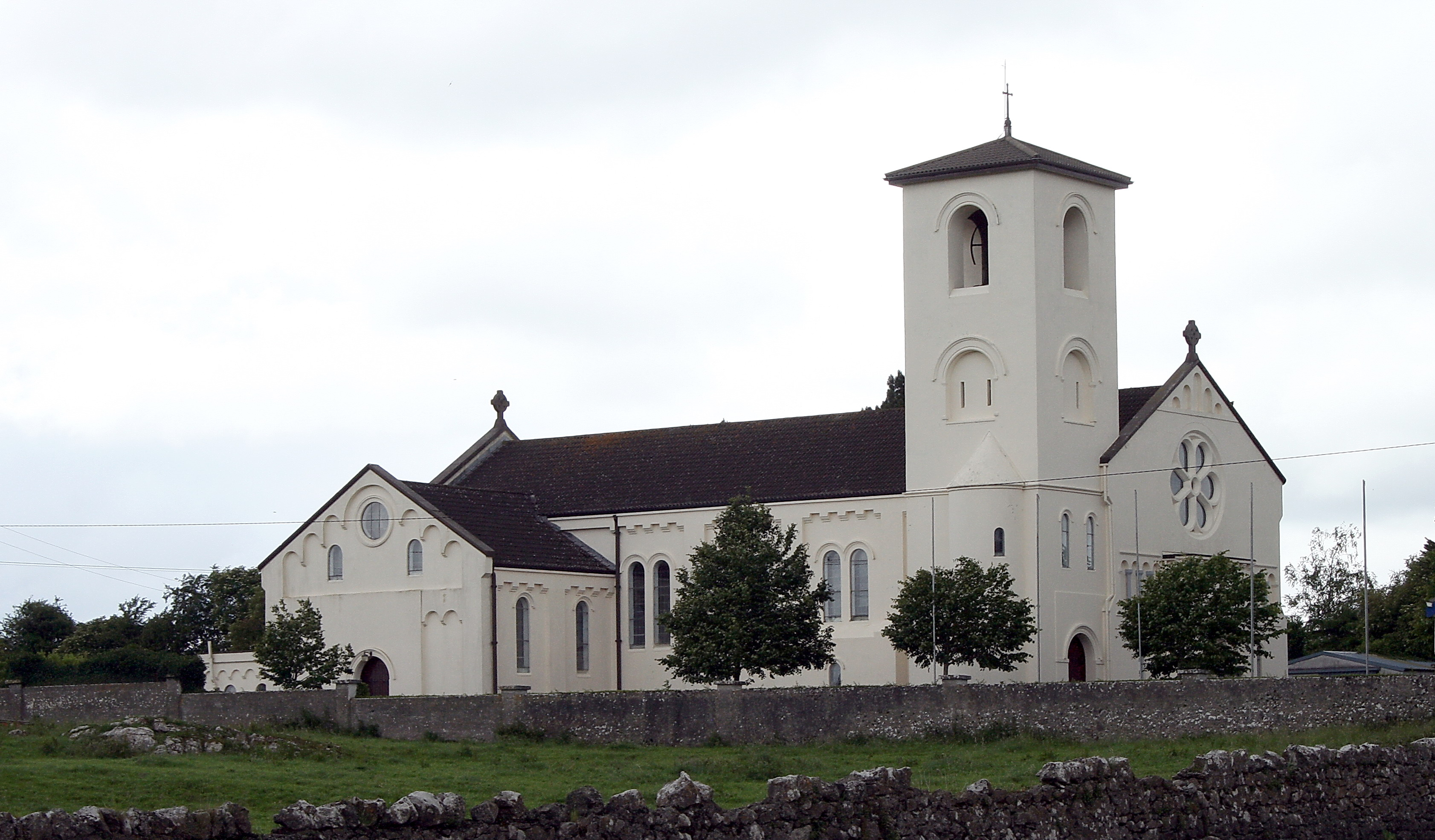
Corpus Christi Church

The Roman Catholic church of Mount Temple was built in 1932 on the site of an earlier Catholic church. Until the 1950s, there were two churches in the village: Corpus Christi and the Church of Ireland Holy Trinity Church. The latter, which was on the site of the old cemetery, succumbed to Ireland's pre-1977 property tax. The Corpus Christi Church is modelled in the Romanesque style of Saint Teresa's Church in Ávila, Spain. It was dedicated on Sunday, 23 July 1933, as Corpus Christi Church following the Eucharistic congress held in Ireland the previous year. Cardinal McRory blessed the church at its consecration. Pope Pius XI blessed the original plans of the church and presented Monsignor Langan, the parish priest, with a rich mosaic crucifix and a jewelled monstrance for use in the new church. The original marble altar rails were a gift from Count John McCormack, Archbishop Curley, and Monsignor Langan. The architects of Corpus Christi Church were T.F. McNamara & Sons in Dublin. The builder contractor was S. Phillips in Drumcondra. Corpus Christi Church is a parish church of Moate, Mount Temple, and Castledaly (Kilcleagh and Ballyloughloe), in the Diocese of Ardagh and Clonmacnoise.

== Notable people ==
- Tony Allen, musician with duo Foster & Allen
- T.R. Dallas (born Tom Allen), singer and local politician
- Nuala Holloway, artist and former Miss Ireland

== See also ==
- List of towns and villages in Ireland
