= Inchbofin =

Island in County Westmeath, Ireland

Native name: Inis Bó Finne
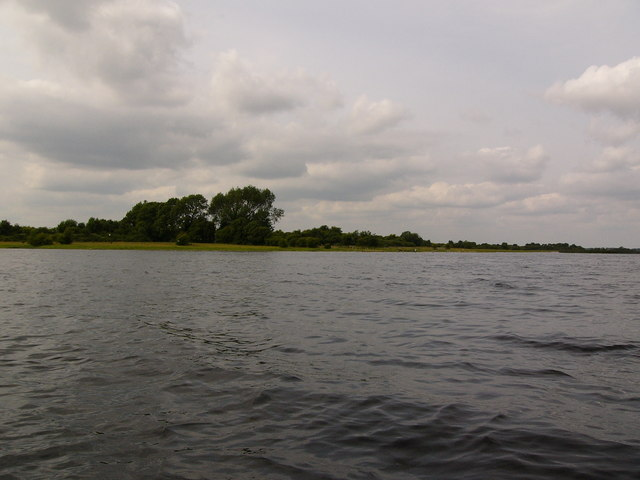

- Location within Ireland

Geography
- Location: River Shannon
- Coordinates: 53.538°N 7.92°W
- Area: 0.266 km^{2} (0.103 sq mi)
- Highest elevation: 41 m (135 ft)

Administration
- Ireland
- Province: Leinster
- County: Westmeath

Demographics
- Population: 0 (2018)
- Ethnic groups: Irish

Inchbofin (Irish: Inis Bó Finne) is an island situated in Lough Ree on the River Shannon, in central Ireland.

== The island ==
Inchbofin is an island of 26.6 ha (66 acres) located in the eastern arm of Lough Ree, with Tang, County Westmeath the nearest village.

== History ==
Inchbofin
- Inis Bó Finne
- Interactive map of Inchbofin

Monastery information
- Other names: Innisbofin; Insula Vaccae Albae
- Order: Canons Regular of Saint Augustine
- Established: 530
- Disestablished: 1540
- Diocese: Meath

People
- Founder: Ríoch

Architecture
- Status: Inactive
- Heritage designation

National monument of Ireland
- Official name: Inchbofin
- Reference no.: 213
- Style: Romanesque

Site
- Location: Lough Ree, County Westmeath
- Visible remains: two churches
- Public access: no

Saint Ríoch is said to have founded a Christian monastery on Inchbofin in AD 530. The island's name is from the Irish Inis Bó Finne, meaning "Island of the white/fair cow", and so it is easily confused with Inishbofin, County Galway and Inishbofin, County Donegal, which have the same Irish name. The Latin calques Īnsula Vaccae Albae or Īnsula Vitulae Albae are also used on occasion. The monastery was of the Canons Regular of Saint Augustine.

The Topographical Dictionary of Ireland (1837) said that of Inchbofin's 64 acres (26 ha), there were 27 acres (11 ha) suitable for arable use. Griffith's Valuation (mid-19th century) mentions three families on the island: Skelly, Connell and Heffernan; the island was owned by Susan Galbraith. In the 1911 census, there were 13 people living on the island, of the same 3 families.

In winter 2009, the Irish Air Corps sent a helicopter to the island to deliver cattle fodder for the last farmer on the island, John Connell, after Lough Ree froze solid.

He was the last permanent resident of the island and died on 12 February 2018.

=== Annalistic references ===
- 750: Fiangalach, son of Anmchadh, son of Maelcuraich, Abbot of Inchbofin, in Lough Ree, died. (Annals of the Four Masters)
- 755: Indrechtach son of Dlúthach, king of Uí Maine, Flaithnia son of Flann grandson of Congal, king of Uí Fhailgi, Fiangalach son of Anmchad son of Mael Curaich, abbot of Inchbofin on Lough Ree, Mac Rónchon of Cenél Cairpri, Snéidcheist, abbot of Naendruim, died. (Annals of Ulster)
- 922: Tomrair son of Elgi, a jarl of the Norsemen, on the Lower Shannon, and he proceeded and plundered Inis Celtra and Muicinis, and burned Clonmacnoise; and he went on Lough Ree and plundered all its islands, and he ravaged Meath.
- 1016: A great hosting by Brian's son to Lough Ree, and he plundered Inchcleraun and Inchbofin, brought away the boats of Mael Sechnaill and Leth Cuinn, and took the hostages of Munster from Cnámhchaill westwards. (Annals of Inisfallen)
- 1089: The fleet of the men of Munster, under the conduct of Muirchertach Ua Briain, arrived on the Shannon, and upon Lough Ree; and they plundered the churches of the lake, namely, Inchcleraun, Inchbofin, Hare Island, and Cloonown. (Annals of the Four Masters)
- 1089: A great fleet led by Muircheartach Ó Briain, king of Munster, on the Shannon and on Lough Ree, and they rifled Inchbofin and Inchcleraun (Annals of Tigernach)

== Buildings ==
The remains of two churches survive on Inchbofin. One (12th century) is at the north-eastern point of the island and has an irregular enclosure. It consists of a nave, transept and sacristy. To the north of the altar is a Romanesque window, and above a window is a carving of a bishop's head. The smaller church ruin to the south is from the 12th/13th centuries.
