= Moyvoughly =

Village in County Westmeath, Ireland

Coordinates: 53°26′N 7°42′W

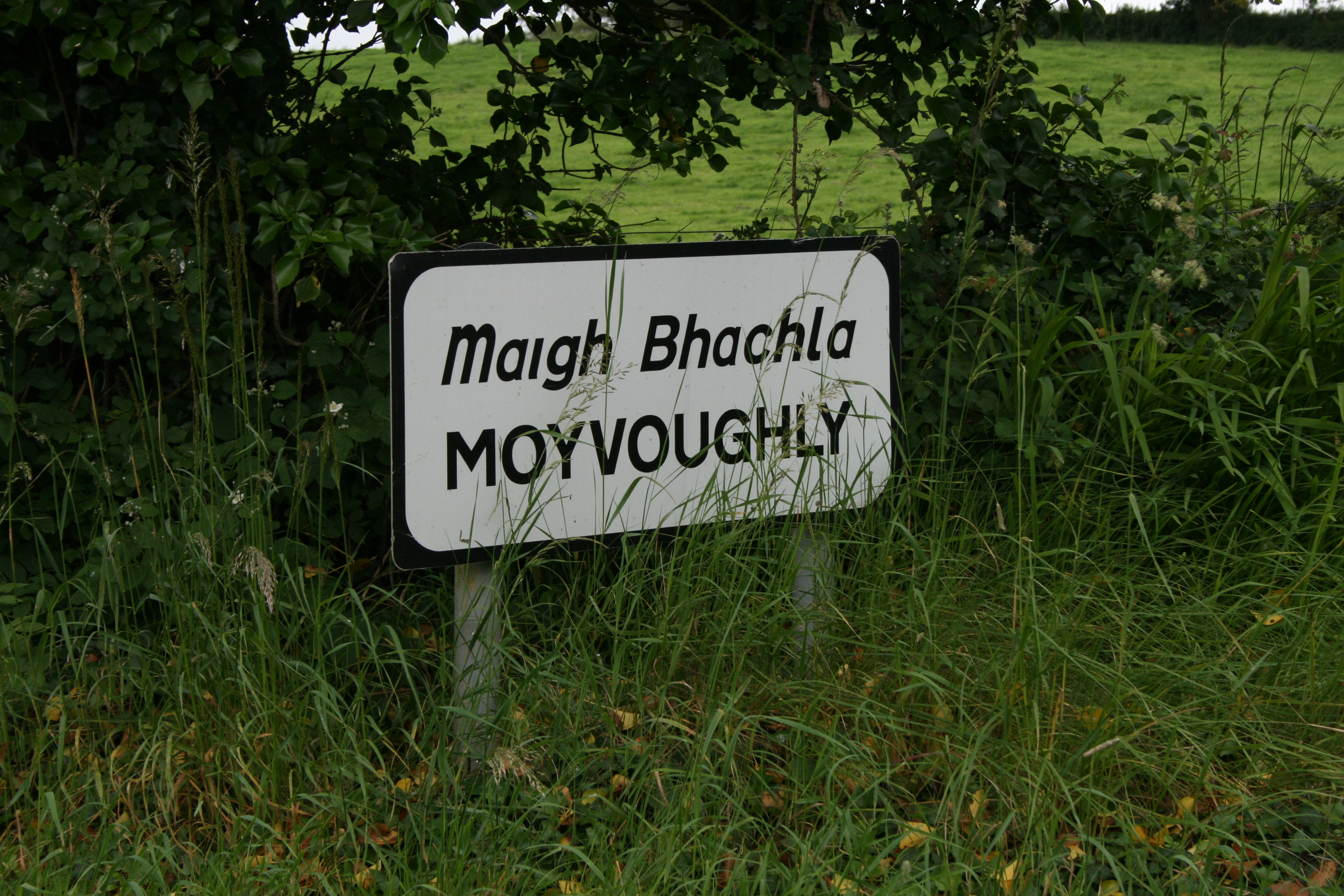
Moyvoughly road sign

Moyvoughly (historically Moyvaghly, from Irish: Maigh Bhachla) is a small village in the countryside of County Westmeath. It is about 5 km north of the town of Moate.

The village has a post office and an old school.

== See also ==
- List of towns and villages in Ireland
