= Ballinahown =

Village in County Westmeath, Ireland

Ballinahown Baile na hAbhann
- Village
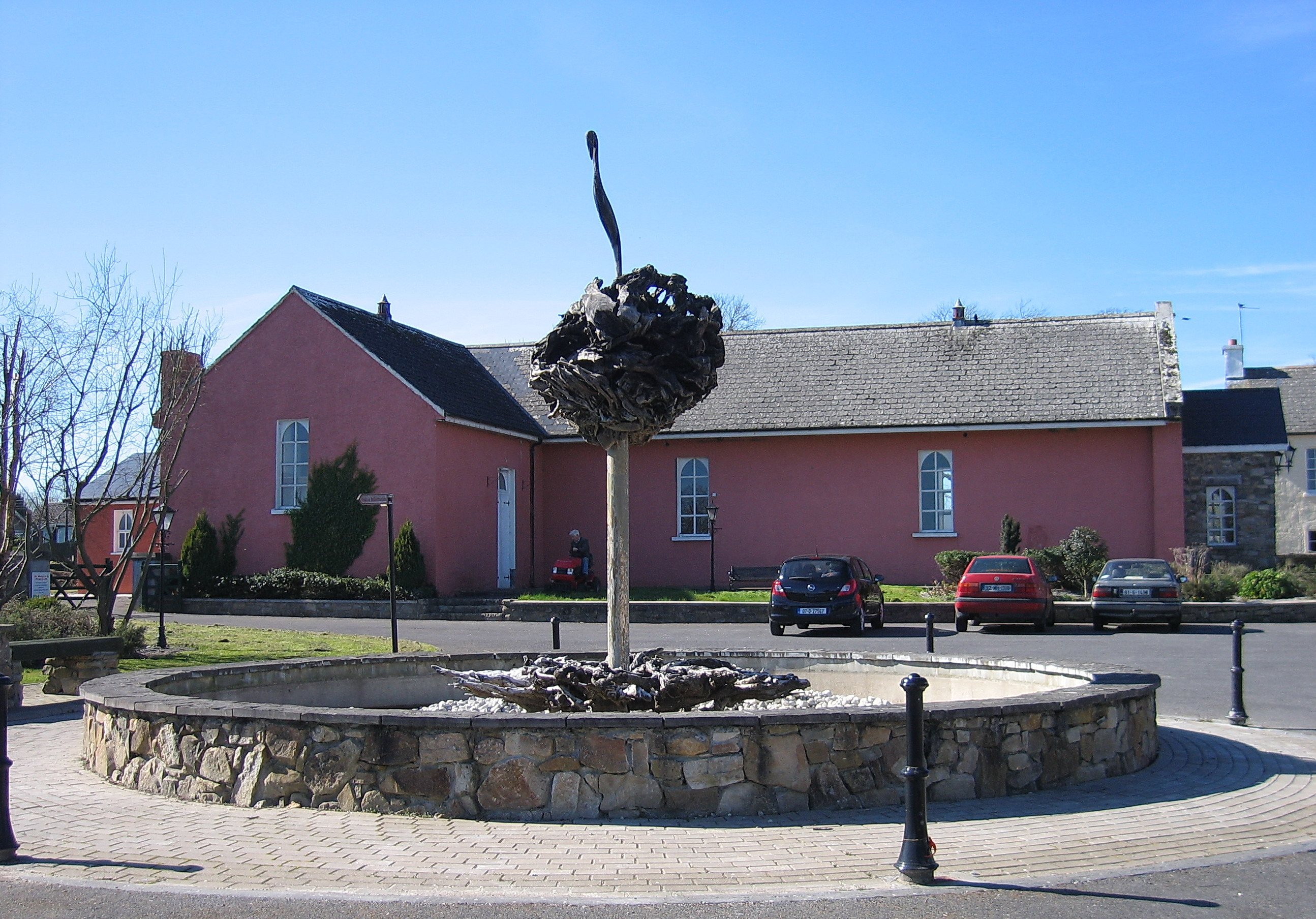
- Ballinahown Community Hall (the old church)

- Location in Ireland
- Coordinates: 53°21′02″N 7°50′56″W
- Country: Ireland
- Province: Leinster
- County: County Westmeath
- Elevation: 128 m (420 ft)

Population (2006)
  - Urban: 250
  - Rural: 3,001
- Time zone: UTC+0 (WET)
  - Summer (DST): UTC-1 (IST (WEST))

Ballinahown (Irish: Buaile na hAbhann), also spelled Ballynahown, is a village in County Westmeath in Ireland. On the N62 road, it is 10 km (6.2 mi) south of Athlone and 5 km (3.1 mi) east of the River Shannon. It contains the Roman Catholic St. Colmcilles Church, completed in 1902 to a design in the Early English Gothic-style by William Hague.

== History ==
For more than nine centuries the village was the residence of the Malone family, who resided in Ballynahown House, a country house and estate on the site of an old castle.

Ballinahown won the 2024 award for Ireland's tidiest village.

== Sport ==
In 2012, Mark Rohan, a former Under 21 footballer from Ballinahown who played with Westmeath until he had a motor cycle accident, won two gold medals in the 2012 Summer Paralympics in the individual H1 handcycle time trial and road race.

== Geography ==
Ballinahown is 10 km (6.2 mi) south of Athlone and 5 km (3.1 mi) east of the River Shannon by air. Clonydonnin Bog is located to the east of the village. An example of a Midlands Raised Bog, it consists of high bog, fringed areas of cutover bog, scrub and low-lying agricultural land. It is inhabited by species such as ling heather (Calluna vulgaris), cross-leaved heath (Erica tetralix), bog asphodel (Narthecium ossifragum), carnation sedge (Carex panicea) and cottongrass (Eriophorum spp.).

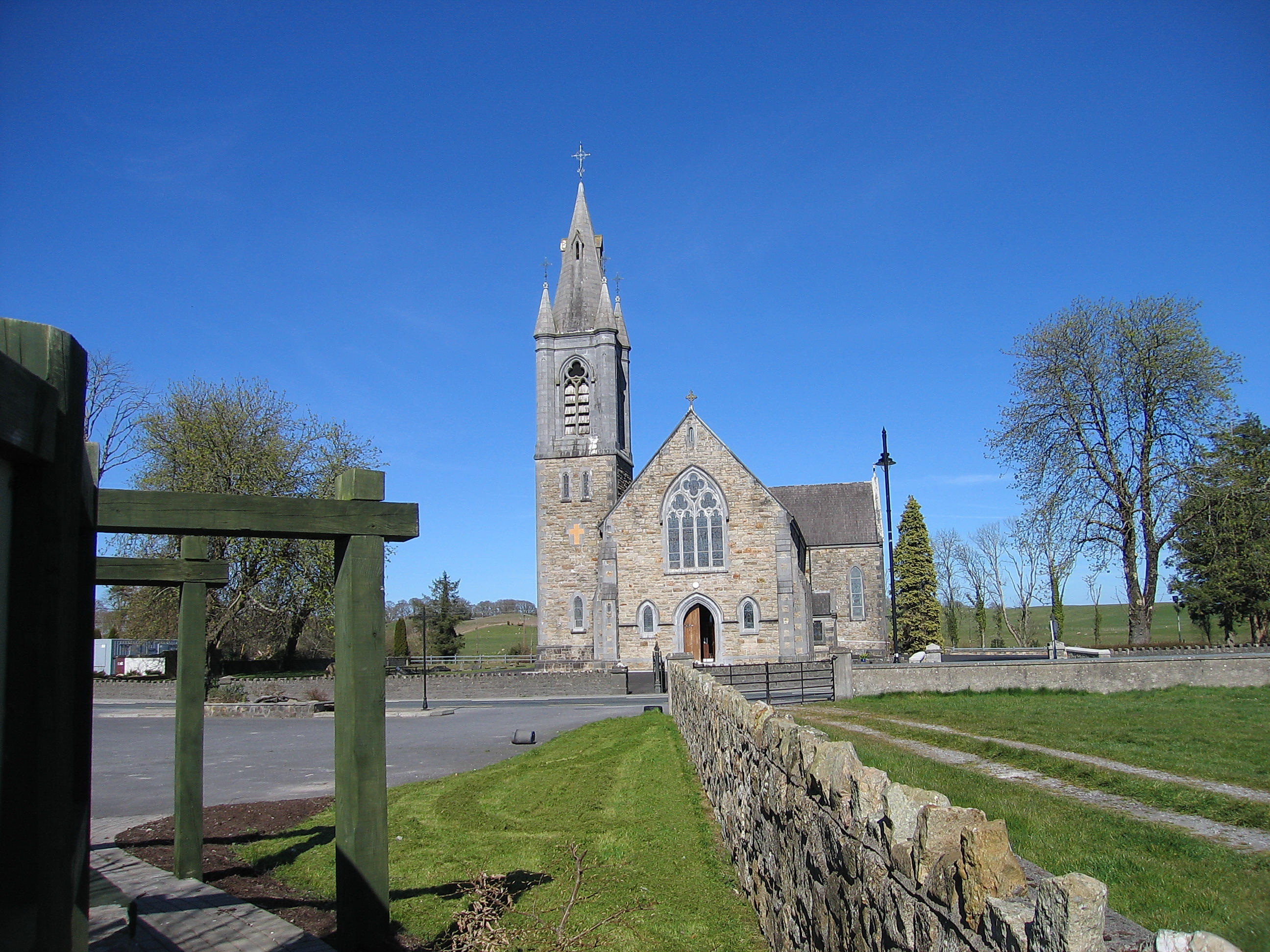
St. Colmcilles Church

== Landmarks ==
The village contains the Roman Catholic St. Colmcilles Church, which was designed in the Early English Gothic-style by William Hague. Construction began on 11 October 1896 but Hague died in 1899 and was completed after his death by his younger partner T. F. McNamara, who finished it in 1902. It opened on the 15 October 1902. According to the Irish National Inventory of Architectural Heritage, it consists of a "four-bay nave, single-bay transepts to the east and west, a shallow single-bay chancel to the north and a two-stage tower (on square-plan) adjoining to the west end of the entrance front (south), having corner pinnacles and a spire on octagonal plan over (with lucarnes)".
