= Gortumly =

Townland in County Westmeath, Ireland

Gortumly is a townland in County Westmeath, Ireland, within the civil parish of Castlelost. The R446 regional road cuts through the south of the townland with the R400 to the west. The town of Rochfortbridge is directly to the south in the townlands of Rahanine and Castlelost. Bordering townlands include Derry, Fearmore and Gibbonstown to the west, Drumman to the east, and Gallstown to the north.
