= Lemongrove, County Westmeath =

Townland in County Westmeath, Ireland

Lemongrove also known as Rathcam is a townland in the civil parish of Enniscoffey in County Westmeath, Ireland.

The townland is located to the north of Milltownpass, bordered by Ballintlevy and Enniscoffey to the north, Bellfield to the west, Claremount to the east and Windmill to the south.
