= Pass of Kilbride =

Townland in County Westmeath, Ireland

Coordinates: 53°26′N 7°14′W

Pass of Kilbride (Irish: Bealach Cille Bríde) is a townland in County Westmeath, Ireland. The townland is located on the border with County Offaly and is in the civil parish of the same name. The M6 motorway runs through the southern part of the townland, with the R400 regional road running through the middle. The Monagh River flows through the south of the area, with the Milltown River forming the western border as it meets the village of Milltownpass, and the Kinnegad River forming the eastern border. The Milltownpass Bog is in the northern part of the townland.

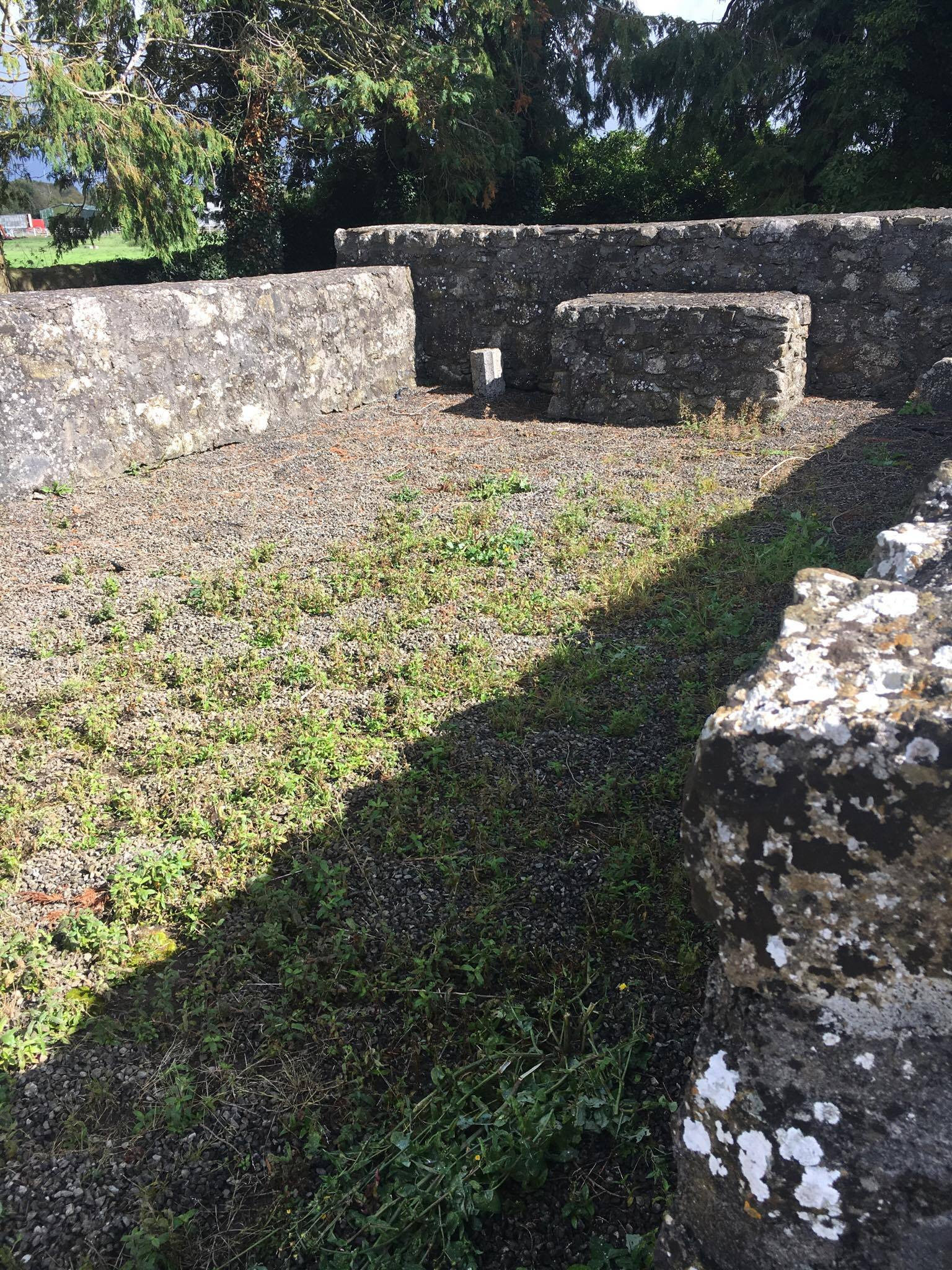
Pass of Kilbride Abbey

== Abbey ==
A partially reconstructed ruined abbey is located in the townland on the outskirts of Milltownpass. In 1640, the land in Pass of Kilbride was owned by Nicholas Darcy, an Irish Papist. There is no church evident on Survey maps from 1656–59. Memorial stones in the small cemetery are from the post-18th century.

In 1976, only an outline, described as low grassy mounds, was visible. In 1991 the outline of the building was restored, complete with a gap where the original doorway would have stood.
