= Kiltotan and Collinstown =

Townland in Ireland

Coordinates: 53.396°N 7.323°W

Killotan and Collinstown is a townland in County Westmeath, Ireland. The townland, which is approximately 1.3 square kilometres (0.5 sq mi) in area, is located on the border with County Offaly and is in the civil parish of Castlelost. The M6 Motorway runs through the middle, near the junction linking up with the R400 regional road. The Monagh River flows through the south of the area. The town of Rochfortbridge is to the east. As of 2011, the townland had a population of 19 people.
