= Clontytallon =

Townland in County Westmeath, Ireland

Clontytallon is a rural townland in County Westmeath, Ireland. The small townland, which is approximately 123 acres (0.2 sq mi) in area, is in the civil parish of Castlelost. It is bordered by the townlands of Fearmore, Whitewell, Castlelost and Derry to the east, Castlelost West to the west and Kilbride to the north. The town of Rochfortbridge is to the south, with Tyrrellspass to the south-west.

Clontytallon is recorded on Griffith's Valuation of 1868, with three tenants living in the area at that time.
