= Farthingstown =

Townland in Castlelost, County Westmeath, Ireland

Coordinates: 53.3960°N 7.3323°W

Farthingstown is a townland in County Westmeath, Ireland. The townland is located on the border with County Offaly and is in the civil parish of Castlelost. The M6 Motorway runs through the middle, with a junction linking up with the R400 regional road. The Monagh River flows through the south of the area. The town of Rochfortbridge is to the north.

== History ==
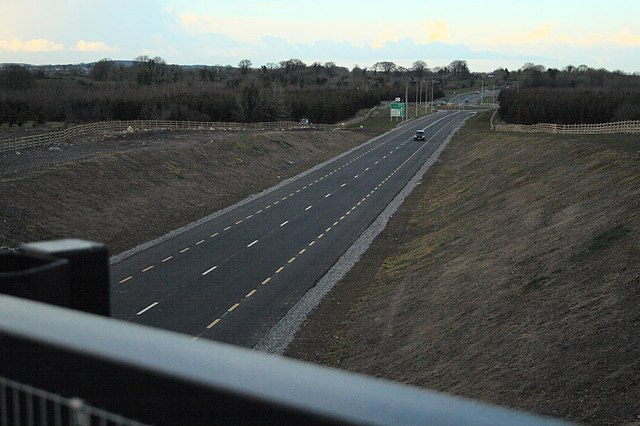
The M6 Motorway as it passes through Farthingstown

On the Griffith Valuation of 1868, Farthingstown is recorded as having over 40 tenants in the area. Most of the properties at that time are owned by the local Rochfort family, based at nearby Belvedere House and Gaulstown.

== Sidebrook House ==
Sidebrook house is a large two-story home dating back to c1815. The house features a unique L-shaped layout. It stands close to the junction with the R400 regional road and the M6 motorway.

== See also ==
- Rochfortbridge
- Castlelost (civil parish)
