= Castlelost West =

Townland in County Westmeath, Ireland

Coordinates: 53.4194°N 7.3449°W

Castlelost West is a townland in County Westmeath, Ireland. It lies within a civil parish of the same name. The R446 regional road runs through the south of the area. The townland of Castlelost lies to the east and contains the town of Rochfortbridge. The town of Tyrrellspass stands to the west of the townland. Castlelost West is bordered by the townlands of Clontytallon and Kilbride to the north, Gneevebane and Oldtown to the south, and Piercetown to the west.

A two-storey house, dating to c. 1760 is in the townland. Another house in the area, Far View House, dates to c. 1820.
