= Corcloon =

Townland in County Westmeath, Ireland

Coordinates: 53.4412°N 7.2762°W

Corcloon is a townland in Milltownpass in County Westmeath, Ireland. The townland is in the civil parish of Pass of Kilbride.

The Milltown River flows through the townland.

The townland stands to the east of the village of Milltownpass, on the R446 regional road and is bordered by Claremount or Cummingstown and Milltown to the east, Gaulstown to the west, Drumman to the south and Windmill to the north.

At the time of the Griffith Valuation in the 1860s, a total of nine families are listed as occupying Corcloon, with an unoccupied building also noted.
