= Castlelost =

Townland in County Westmeath, Ireland

Coordinates: 53.4353°N 7.2721°W

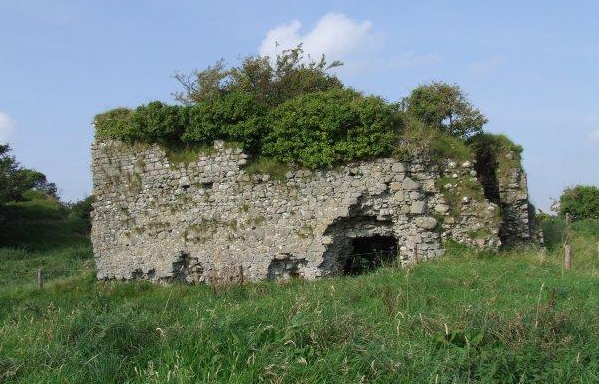
Castlelost Castle

Castlelost is a townland in County Westmeath, Ireland. It is located within the civil parish of Castlelost. The R446 road runs through the middle of the area, and a section of the R400 links the townland with the M6 motorway. Castlelost townland is bordered by Castlelost West and Clontytallon to the west, Derry to the north, Farthingstown and Oldtown to the south and Gortumly and Rahanine to the east.

Castlelost Castle, a ruined castle dating to the Norman invasion of Ireland, is situated in the north of the townland.

The western side of the town of Rochfortbridge lies in the townland, with the east of the town laying in the neighbouring townland of Rahanine. St. Joseph's School and the Church of the Immaculate Conception, within Castlelost townland, serve Rochfortbridge and the surrounding area.

At the time of Griffith's Valuation, in 1868, there were 37 tenants living in Castlelost.
