= Claremount, County Westmeath =

Townland in County Westmeath, Ireland

Claremount, also known as Cummingstown, is a townland in the civil parish of Enniscoffey in County Westmeath, Ireland.

The townland is located to the north of Milltownpass, a section of Milltownpass Bog stands in the east of the townland. The townlands of Corcloon borders the townland to the south, Pass of Kilbride is to the east and Enniscoffey stands to the north.

== Claremount House ==
A large 19th Century country house stands on the townland, dating between 1870 and 1890.
