= Beggstown =

Townland in County Westmeath, Ireland

Coordinates: 53.452557°N 7.330997°W

Beggstown is a small townland in County Westmeath, Ireland. The townland is located in the civil parish of Kilbride. The R400 regional road runs through the middle of the area. The townland is to the south of Mullingar, and the north of Rochfortbridge.

Beggstown, which is 0.33 square kilometres (0.13 sq mi) in area, had no recorded population as of the 2011 census.
