= Derry, County Westmeath =

Townland in County Westmeath, Ireland

Derry is a townland in County Westmeath, Ireland. The townland is located in the civil parish Castlelost. The R400 regional road runs through the east of the area. The townland of Castlelost lies to the east and contains the town of Rochfortbridge. The small townlands of Clontytallon and Whitewell are to the west. Fearmore lies to the north.
