= Enniscoffey =

Enniscoffey may refer to:

- Enniscoffey (civil parish), a civil parish in County Westmeath, Ireland
- Enniscoffey (townland), a townland in County Westmeath, Ireland
