= Drumman =

Townland in County Westmeath, Ireland

Drumman, also known as Drummond is a townland in Milltownpass in County Westmeath, Ireland. The townland is in the civil parish of Pass of Kilbride and is on the border with County Offaly. The M6 Motorway cuts through the middle of the townland, and the R446 regional road forms the northern border with the townlands of Milltown and Corcloon. The village of Milltownpass is located to the east of the townland, with Rochfortbridge to the west.

The Monagh River flows through the south of the townland.

== History ==
At the time of the Griffith Valuation in 1868, only a single tenant is listed at Drumman. A number of local families held farmland in the area in later decades, including the Johnsons, Whelehans and McGuires.

== Drumman Lodge ==
Drumman Lodge is an unused two story farmhouse, dating back to the 1740s. The home features bay windows, a natural slate roof, and a complex of outhouses. The building shows signs of being rebuilt c1815, making use of the buildings original materials.

Bernard Charles Molloy, an Irish lawyer and politician resided at the lodge until his death on 26 June 1916.
