= Fearmore =

Townland in Ireland

Coordinates: 53°26′8″N 7°18′46″W

Fearmore (Irish: Fiar Mór) is a townland in County Westmeath, Ireland. The townland is located in the civil parish of Kilbride. The R400 regional road runs through the east of the area. The townland of Derry lies to the south, Clontytallon and Whitewell to the west, Gibbonstown to the east and the town of Rochfortbridge is to the south.
