= Gaulstown, County Westmeath =

Townland in County Westmeath, Ireland

Coordinates: 53.4351°N 7.2824°W

Gaulstown, also spelt Gallstown is a townland in County Westmeath, Ireland. The townland is located in between the towns of Rochfortbridge and Milltownpass, close to the R446 regional road. Neighbouring townlands include Bellfield, Corcloon, Drumman, Milltown and Windmill to the east, Gibbonstown and Gortumly to the west and Mahonstown to the north.

== History ==
The townland is recorded on the Griffith Valuation in 1868, under Gallstown. A total of 10 tenants are listed in the townland, residing on property owned by the Lord Kilmaine. The Lord Kilmaine himself (Francis Browne, 4th Baron Kilmaine) is also residing in the townland.

== Gaulstown House ==
Gaulstown House was a large country house that stood on the townland. The house was home of the Rochfort family for centuries, before being passed to John Browne, 1st Baron Kilmaine and his descendants. It was largely demolished in an attack by the Irish Republican Army during the Irish War of Independence.

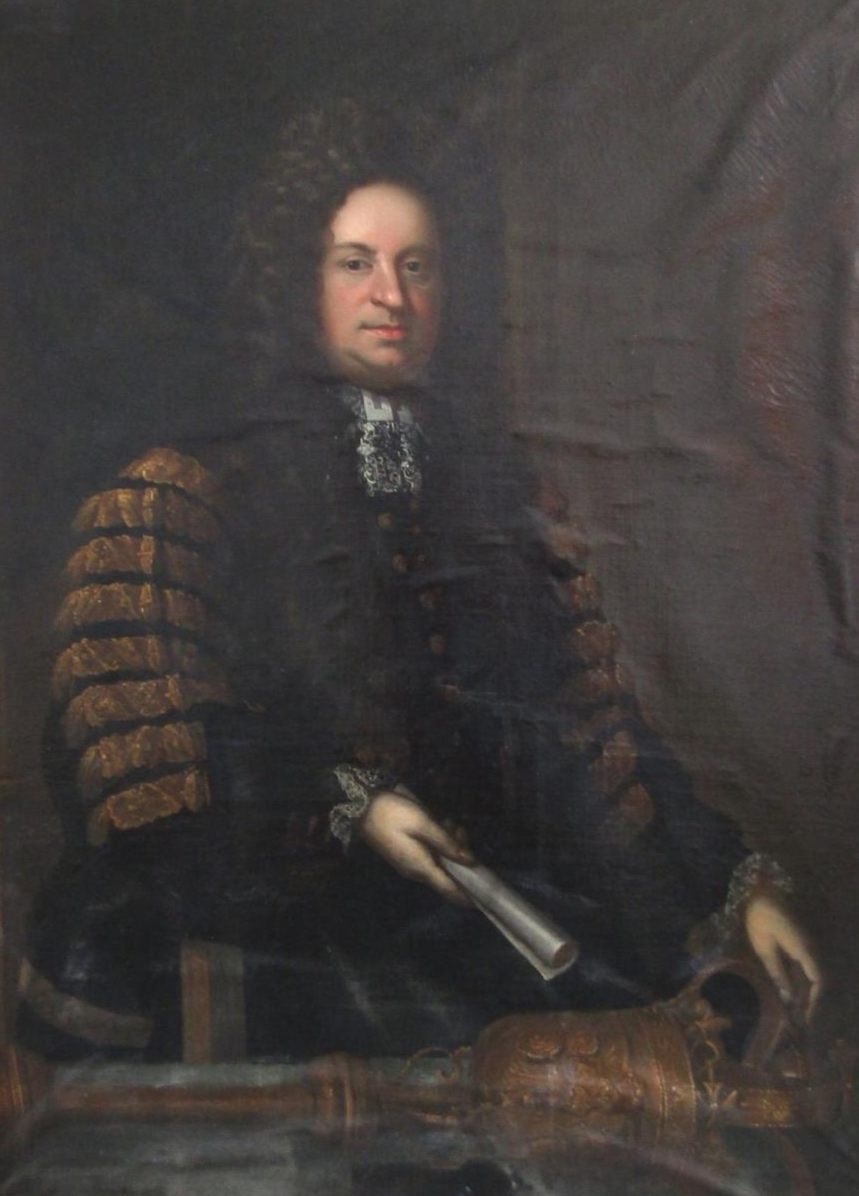
Robert Rochfort (1652-1727)

Residents of the house included:

- James Rochfort (until his death in 1652)
- Robert Rochfort (1652-1727)
- George Rochfort
- Robert Rochfort, 1st Earl of Belvedere (1708-1774)
- George Rochfort, 2nd Earl of Belvedere (1738-sold the home in 1784)
- John Browne, 1st Baron Kilmaine (1730–1794, purchased the home in 1784)
- James Caulfeild Browne, 2nd Baron Kilmaine (1765–1825)
- John Cavendish Browne, 3rd Baron Kilmaine (1794–1873)
- Francis William Browne, 4th Baron Kilmaine (1843–1907)
- John Edward Deane Browne, 5th Baron Kilmaine (1878–1946)
