= List of national monuments in County Offaly =

The Irish state has officially approved the following list of national monuments in County Offaly. In the Republic of Ireland, a structure or site may be deemed to be a "national monument", and therefore worthy of state protection, if it is of national importance. If the land adjoining the monument is essential to protect it, this land may also be protected.

== National Monuments ==
NM#	Monument name	Description	Image	Townland	Location
672	Cadamstown Bridge	Bridge		Cadamstown	53°07′53″N 7°39′25″W
617	Cannakill	Deserted Medieval Village		Cannakill	53°20′45″N 7°17′31″W
510	Kinnitty Cross	High cross & medieval wall		Kinnitty	53°06′11″N 7°41′51″W
497	Saighir (Seir Kieran)	Early Medieval Ecclesiastical Site		Churchland and Clonmore	53°04′15″N 7°47′34″W
336	Clonfinlough Stone	Rock Art		Clonfinlough	53°19′03″N 7°56′09″W
532	Clonin Earthworks	Earthworks		Clonin and Bawnmore	53°14′16″N 7°18′46″W
81	Clonmacnoise	Early Medieval Ecclesiastical Site		Clonmacnoise	53°19′37″N 7°59′10″W
678,313	Durrow Abbey	Cross, Church, graveslabs & motte		Durrow	53°19′34″N 7°31′22″W
504	Gallen Abbey	Church & Slabs		Gallen	53°15′45″N 7°49′24″W
82	Rahan Churches	Churches		Rahan	53°16′45″N 7°36′45″W

== Sources ==
- National Monuments in County Offaly
