= Castlejordan =

Castlejordan may refer to the following places in Ireland:

- Castlejordan, County Meath, a village and townland in County Meath
- Castlejordan (civil parish), a civil parish in County Meath
