= Kilbride, County Westmeath =

Townland in County Westmeath, Ireland

Kilbride Irish: Cill Bhríde
- Townland
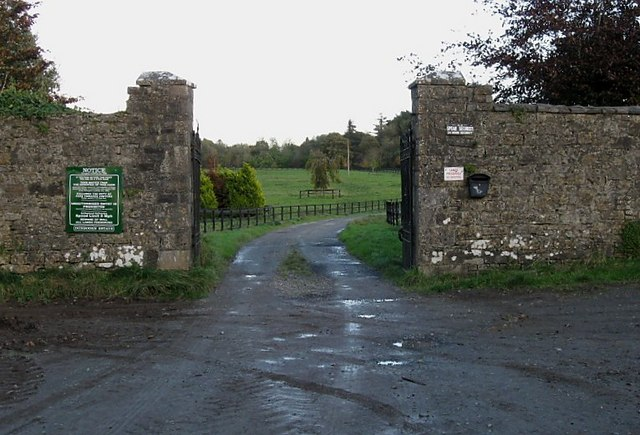
- Dunboden Park demesne is partly in Kilbride townland

- Location within Ireland
- Coordinates: 53.446°N 7.337°W
- Country: Ireland
- Province: Leinster
- County: County Westmeath
- Irish grid reference: N440441

Kilbride (Irish: Cill Bhríde) is a rural townland in County Westmeath, Ireland. The townland, which is approximately 475.5 acres (2 km^{2}) in area, had a population of 26 people (in 10 occupied houses) as of the 2011 census. Kilbride townland is located within a civil parish of the same name. The town of Dalystown lies to the west, with Rochfortbridge and the townlands of Castlelost and Castlelost West to the south.

== History ==
Evidence of ancient settlement in the area includes a number of ringfort, bawn and holy well sites within Kilbride townland.

A carved recumbent stone, known locally as the "De Profundis Stone", is also in Kilbride. Shaped into a "coffin-like" shape with a crude cross carved into the top, the stone is approximately 0.94 metres (3 ft) in length and was possibly used to mark an ancient graveyard. It takes its name from a local tradition of stopping a funerary procession at the stone, and reciting the "De Profundis" (a colloquial name for Psalm 130 of the Old Testament). (Note: Psalm 130 in its Latin form is sometimes colloquially known as the "De profundis" as these are the first words of its opening line.) The Kilbride slab, made of limestone, is the only known remaining example in Ireland at which this "De Profundis" tradition was performed.

The ruin of Dunboden Park, a 19th century estate house, is also in the area. The estate was historically associated with the Cooper family. While the main estate house is now in ruin, a number of structures on the demesne (including a mausoleum and stable block) remain standing.
