= Pass of Kilbride (civil parish) =

Civil parish in County Westmeath, Ireland

Pass of Kilbride Bealach Cille Bríde
- Civil parish
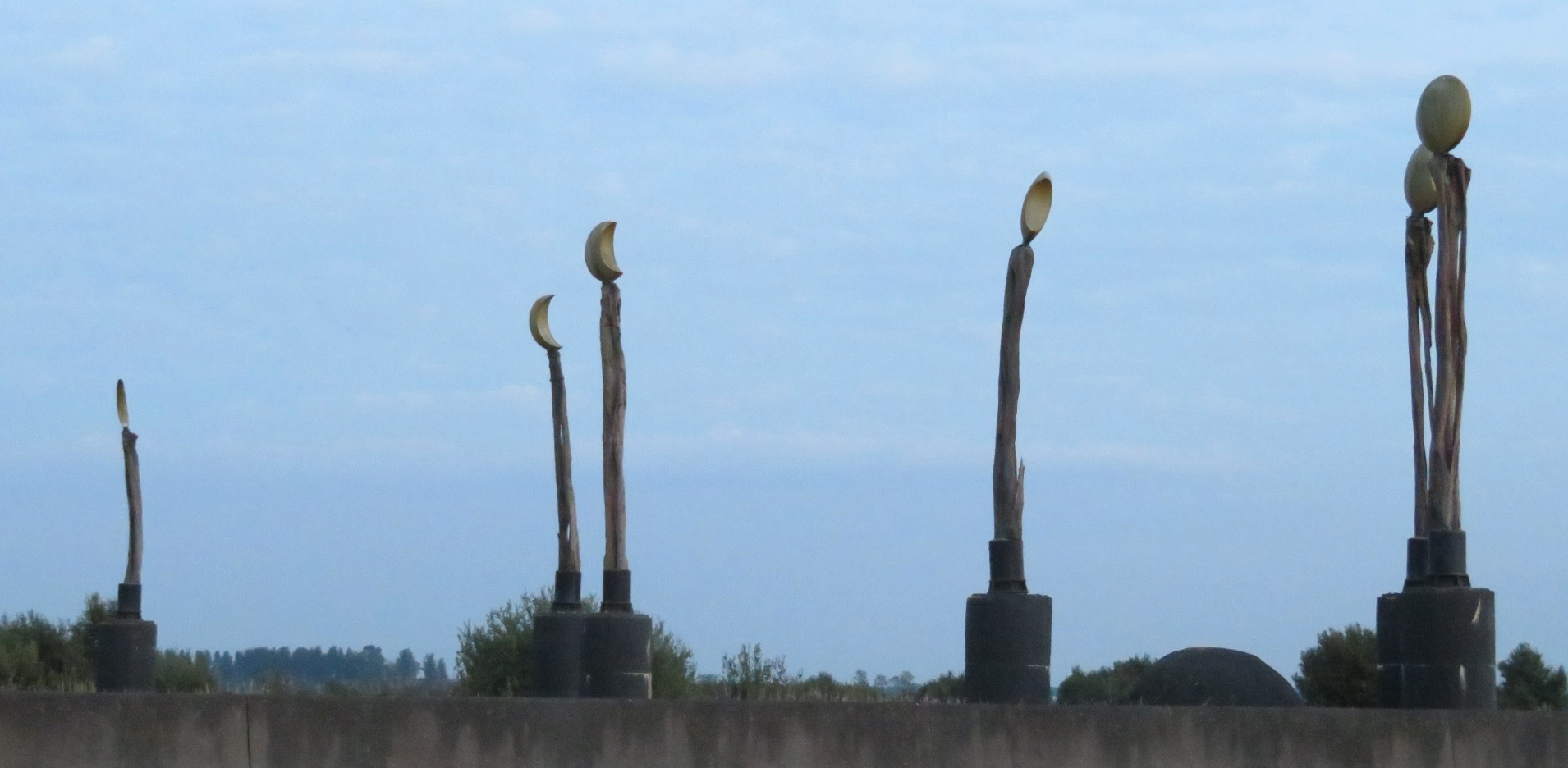
- Passage, a sculpture by Brian O'Loughlin (2006) at Pass of Kilbride

- Location of Pass of Kilbride within County Westmeath in Ireland
- Coordinates: 53°26′23″N 7°14′3″W
- Country: Ireland
- Province: Leinster
- County: County Westmeath
- Irish grid reference: N509435

Pass of Kilbride (Irish: Bealach Cille Bríde) is a civil parish in County Westmeath, Ireland. It is located about 12 km (7 mi) south‑south‑east of Mullingar.

Pass of Kilbride is one of 10 civil parishes in the barony of Fartullagh in the province of Leinster. The civil parish covers 4,094.9 acres (16.571 km^{2}).

Pass of Kilbride civil parish comprises the village of Milltownpass and 5 townlands: Corcloon, Drumman, Gallstown, Milltown and Pass of Kilbride.

An Abbey stands outside the village of Milltownpass, known locally as Pass of Kilbride Abbey.

The neighbouring civil parishes are: Enniscoffey to the north, Killucan (barony of Farbill), Ballyboggan (County Meath) and Castlejordan (County Meath) to the east, Castlelost to the south and Kilbride to the west.
