= Piercetown, County Westmeath (townland) =

Townland in County Westmeath, Ireland

Piercetown is a townland in County Westmeath, Ireland. The townland is in the civil parish of Castlelost. The town of Tyrrellspass lies to the south-west, and Rochfortbridge is to the east. Bordering townlands include Meedin to the west, Castlelost West to the east, Gneevebane to the south and Kilbrennan to the north.
