= Simonstown =

Simonstown may refer to the following places:

- Simon's Town, a suburb of Cape Town, South Africa

- Simon's Town Naval Base, South Africa's largest naval base, situated at Simon's Town near Cape Town

- Simonstown, Kilbride, a townland in County Westmeath, Ireland

== See also ==
- Simonstown Agreement, a naval agreement between South Africa and the United Kingdom
- Simonstown Gaels GAA, a Gaelic Athletic Association club based in County Meath, Ireland
