= St Brigid's GAA =

St Brigid's GAA may refer to:

- St Brigid's GAA (Dublin), a sports club in Castleknock, Fingal, Ireland
- St Brigid's Killashee, a sports club in County Longford, Ireland
- St Brigid's, a sports club in Ballinacree, County Meath, Ireland
- St Brigid's GAA (Roscommon), a sports club in Kiltoom and Cam, Ireland
- St Brigid's, a sports club in Dalystown, County Westmeath, Ireland

== See also ==
- CLG Naomh Bríd, a sports club in Donegal, Ireland
- St Brigid's GAC (Antrim), a sports club in Belfast
