= Catherinestown, County Westmeath =

Townland in County Westmeath, Ireland

Catherinestown is a townland in County Westmeath, Ireland. The townland is located in the civil parish of Lynn. The townland lies to the east of the R400 road, and to the south of Mullingar.
