= Castlelost Castle =

Castle in County Westmeath, Ireland

Coordinates: 53.4205°N 7.3225°W

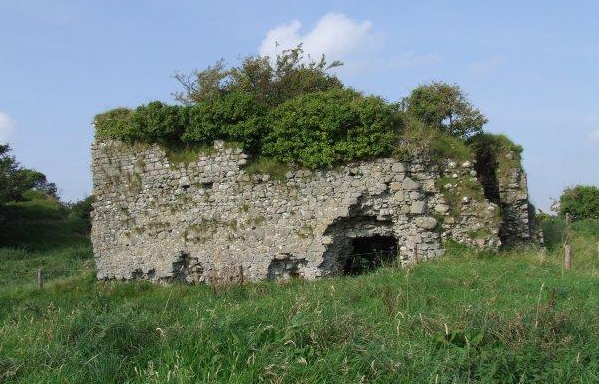
Castlelost Castle

Castlelost Castle (Irish: Caisleán Loiste, meaning 'castle of the losset') is a ruined motte-and-bailey castle located in the townland of Castlelost, just north of Rochfortbridge in County Westmeath, Ireland. The castle dates to the Norman invasion of Ireland, with some sources dating its construction to the late 12th century and associating it with Hugh Tyrrel (died 1199). The castle remained within the Tyrrel family through the 16th century. During the 17th century, the castle and surrounding lands were lost by the Tyrrels during the Irish Rebellion of 1641 and subsequent Cromwellian conquest of Ireland.The only visible features still on the site are the ruined tower house as well as a small nearby motte. The castle, its motte and the remnants of a nearby bailey (courtyard) are listed on the Record of Monuments and Places for County Westmeath.

== Geography and site description ==
Castlelost is located in the barony of Fartullagh in County Westmeath. According to Goddard Henry Orpen, the motte and castle are situated about one mile north of Rochfortbridge. The motte was constructed on a slightly raised bailey measuring about 75 by 46 yd (69 by 42 m), with the castle built with its entrance facing the motte. The motte rises about 16 feet above the surrounding raised bailey, and the church is located roughly 400 yd (370 m) to the north-east of the site, which appears to have been semi-fortified.

The site's layout is notable in that when the stone castle was built, the door faced the motte, suggesting a specific defensive arrangement. Archaeological evidence indicates that the motte was likely formed by cutting away the eastern part of a natural knoll to a height of about 6 ft (1.8 m), with the resulting material used to construct the mound. The western portion of the knoll served as a raised bailey. There are also traces of another enclosure to the north, and when the stone castle was constructed, another bailey was added to the south. The road from Rochfortbridge has cut into the motte on one side, and the opposite side has been mutilated, leaving the summit with dimensions of about 23 by 13 yd (21 by 12 m), though it was probably originally circular.

== Historical ownership ==
Historical records indicate strong evidence that Castlelost belonged to Hugh Tyrrell, who was likely the seneschal of the elder Hugh de Lacy, and was in the hands of the Tyrrell family from the early 13th century. According to extracts from the Register of St. Mary's Abbey in Dublin cited by Orpen, Hugh Tyrrell, Lord of Castleknock, was also Lord of several other locations including "Castlelofty (Castlelost)" by 1487.

Records indicate that Hugh Tyrrell granted the church of Castlelost to the Prior of Little Malvern, a gift that was confirmed to the abbot of St. Mary's in Dublin. Later, on August 25, 1486, Maurice Tyrrell, then Lord of Castlelost, transferred Irish property of the Priory.

Orpen suggests that the motte at Castlelost may be attributed to the elder Hugh Tyrrel, with construction likely around the same time as Hugh de Lacy built his motte castle at Durrow in 1186. The earliest contemporary mention of Castlelost found by Orpen appears in the Ecclesiastical Taxation of the Deanery of Mullingar (1302–1306), where the name appears in various forms including "Castellosar" and "Castell osti".

== Etymology ==
The name "Castlelost" has been the subject of etymological debate. Orpen discusses that while the name was a puzzle that had suggested "an obvious pun", he believed he could provide the true etymology. He argues the name belongs to the curious group derived from the Irish word "losaid" (genitive "loiste"), meaning "a kneading-trough". According to Dr. Joyce cited by Orpen, the word "losaid" was applied by farmers to fertile land which they saw as "covered with rich produce, like a kneading-trough filled with dough", and was used metaphorically in place-names.

"Caisleán na loiste" would thus mean "the Castle of the losset or rich land". Orpen notes that O'Donovan stated that in County Cavan, farmers would call a well-laid-out field their "fine losset, or table spread with food". Orpen suggests that the place may have been known as "the losset" before the castle was built, noting that there were about a dozen townlands in Ireland simply called "Losset".

== See also ==
- Castlelost (civil parish)
