= Gaybrook Demesne =

Town in Ireland

Gaybrook Demesne more commonly known as Gaybrook is a townland in the civil parish of Enniscoffey in County Westmeath, Ireland.

The townland is located to the south of Mullingar, to the north of Rochfortbridge and Milltownpass, and to the east of Lough Ennell.

Quare Times, the winner of the 1955 Grand National was owned by Mrs. Wellman at Gaybrook House, she was the former wife of Robert Smyth.
