= Windmill, County Westmeath =

Townland (old administrative division) in Ireland

Windmill also known as Blackislands is a townland in the civil parish of Enniscoffey in County Westmeath, Ireland.

The townland is located to the northwest of Milltownpass, with the Milltown river forming its western border with the townlands of Bellfield and Gaulstown. The townland of Corcloon stands to the south and east.
