= Cloncrow Bog (New Forest) =

Peat bog in County Westmeath, Ireland

Coordinates: 53.390°N 7.401°W

Cloncrow Bog (New Forest) is a peat bog in County Westmeath, Ireland. The bog is near the village of Tyrrellspass on the R446 regional road.

As a raised bog of ecological interest, it was declared a Natural Heritage Area in 2005.

== Restoration of Cloncrow Bog ==
Between 2019 and 2023 restoration work took place on Cloncrow Bog.

== See also ==
- Tyrrellspass
- Bog of Allen
- Milltownpass Bog
