= Mahonstown =

Mahonstown may refer to the following places in Ireland:

- Mahonstown, Meath, a townland; see List of townlands of County Meath
- Mahonstown, Westmeath, a townland
