= Rahanine =

Townland in County Westmeath, Ireland

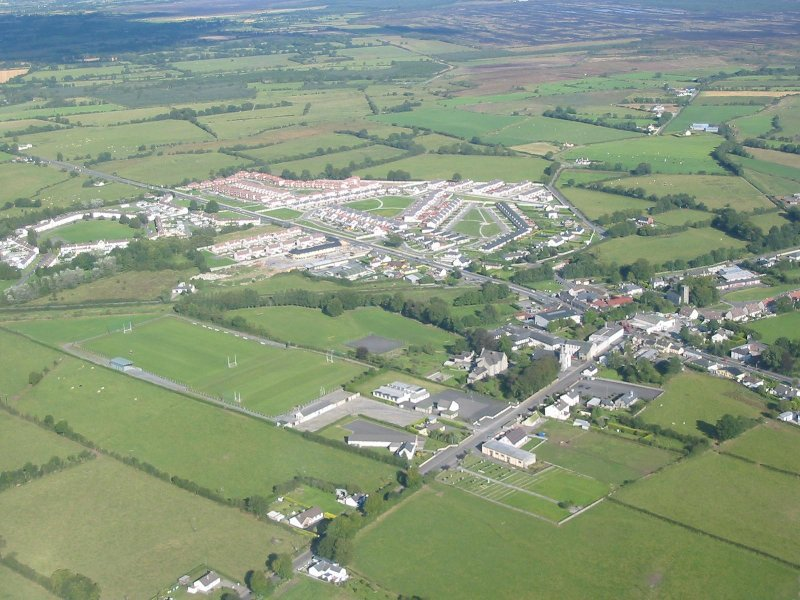
Aerial view of Rochfortbridge, showing the townland of Rahanine

Rahanine is a townland in County Westmeath, Ireland. The townland is located on the border with County Offaly and is in the civil parish of Castlelost. The M6 motorway runs through the middle, with the R446 regional road cutting through the north. The Monagh River flows through the south of the area. The eastern side of the town of Rochfortbridge lies in the townland, which contains a number of neighborhoods including Derrygreenagh Park. The eastern side of Rochfortbridge lies within the townland of Castlelost.
