= Oldtown, Castlelost =

Townland in County Westmeath, Ireland

Oldtown is a townland in County Westmeath, Ireland. The townland is approximately 1.4 square kilometres (0.5 sq mi) in area, and located near the border with County Offaly in the civil parish of Castlelost. The M6 Motorway runs to the south near the junction linking up with the R400 regional road. The R446 regional road cuts through the middle of the townland. The town of Rochfortbridge is to the east. As of the 2011 census, the townland had a population of 25 people in 9 homes.
