= Lainn =

Lainn may refer to:

- Lynn (civil parish), County Westmeath, Ireland
- Lyne, Scottish Borders, a village and civil parish
