= Dalystown =

Dalystown Baile Uí Dhálaigh
- Village
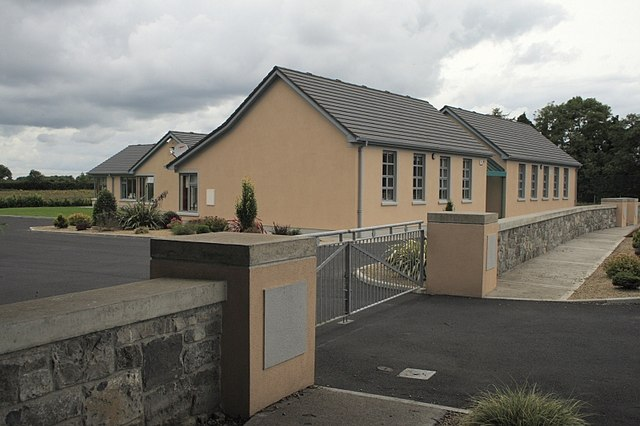
- Dalystown School

- Location in Ireland
- Coordinates: 53°26′24″N 7°22′12″W
- Country: Ireland
- Province: Leinster
- County: County Westmeath
- Time zone: UTC+0 (WET)
  - Summer (DST): UTC-1 (IST (WEST))
- Irish Grid Reference: N503438

Dalystown (Irish: Baile Uí Dhálaigh) is a village in Carrick, County Westmeath, Ireland. It is located in the south of the county on the N52 road, to the north of Tyrrellspass and Rochfortbridge.

The village has a national school and a public house. Lough Ennell is to the north of the village.

== See also ==
- List of towns and villages in Ireland
- Carrick, County Westmeath
