= R348 road (Ireland) =

Road in Ireland

R348 road
- Bóthar R348

Route information
- Length: 51 km (32 mi)

Location
- Country: Ireland
- Primary destinations: County Galway; Starts at the R446 5km east of Oranmore; Crosses the Dublin-Galway railway line twice; Athenry – (R347); (R349); Kiltullagh; (R350); New Inn; R359; Moyvore; Kilconnell; (R358); Ballinasloe – terminates at the R446

Highway system
- Roads in Ireland; Motorways; Primary; Secondary; Regional

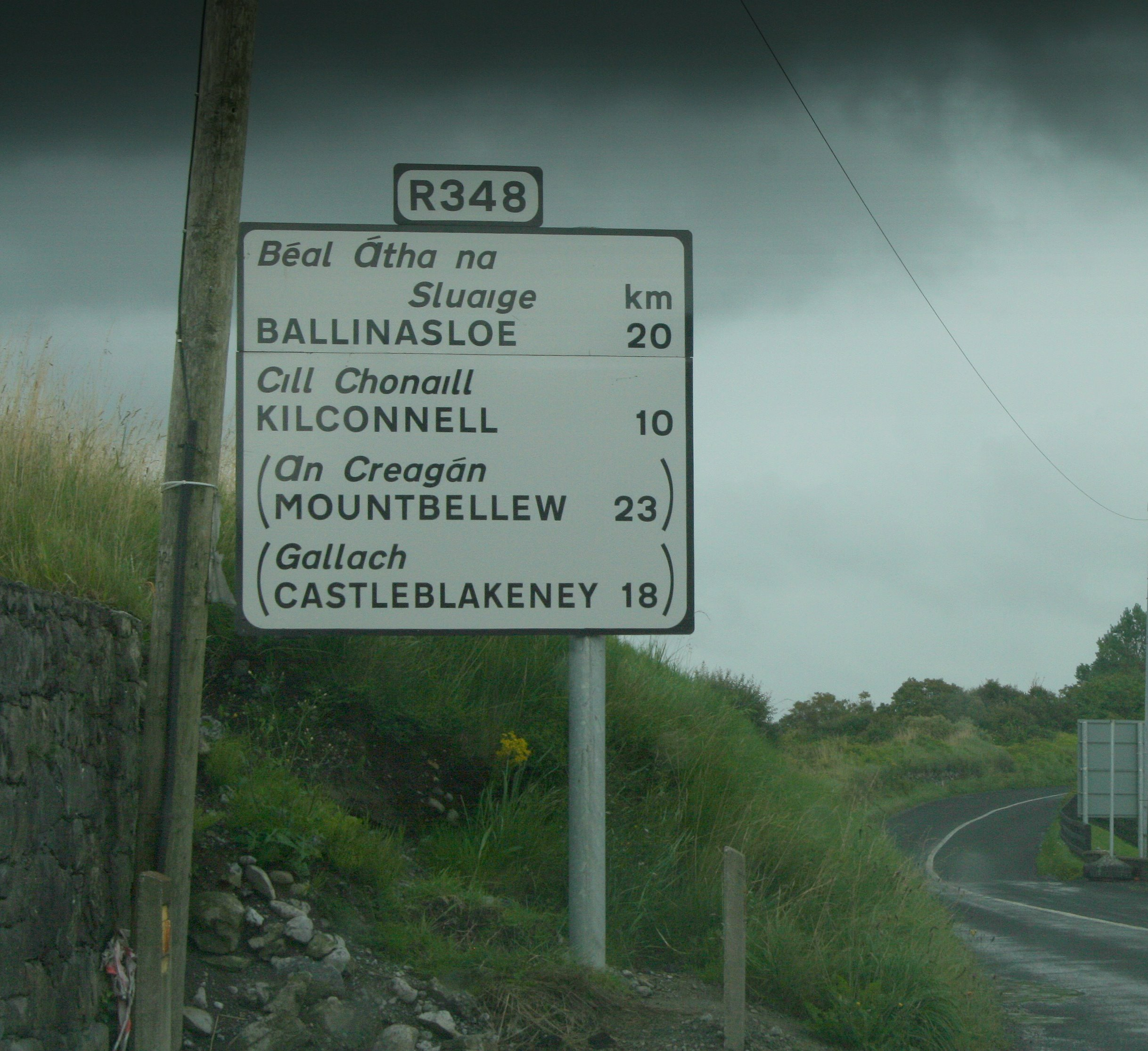
Sign on the R348 regional road Clickable image: click a sign to go to its destination article

The R348 road is a regional road in Ireland stretching east–west for 51 km (32 mi) along a route north of the R446. It leaves the R446 east of Oranmore and rejoins it in Ballinasloe. The full length of the road lies within County Galway.

The route passes through the southern end of Athenry and several small villages.

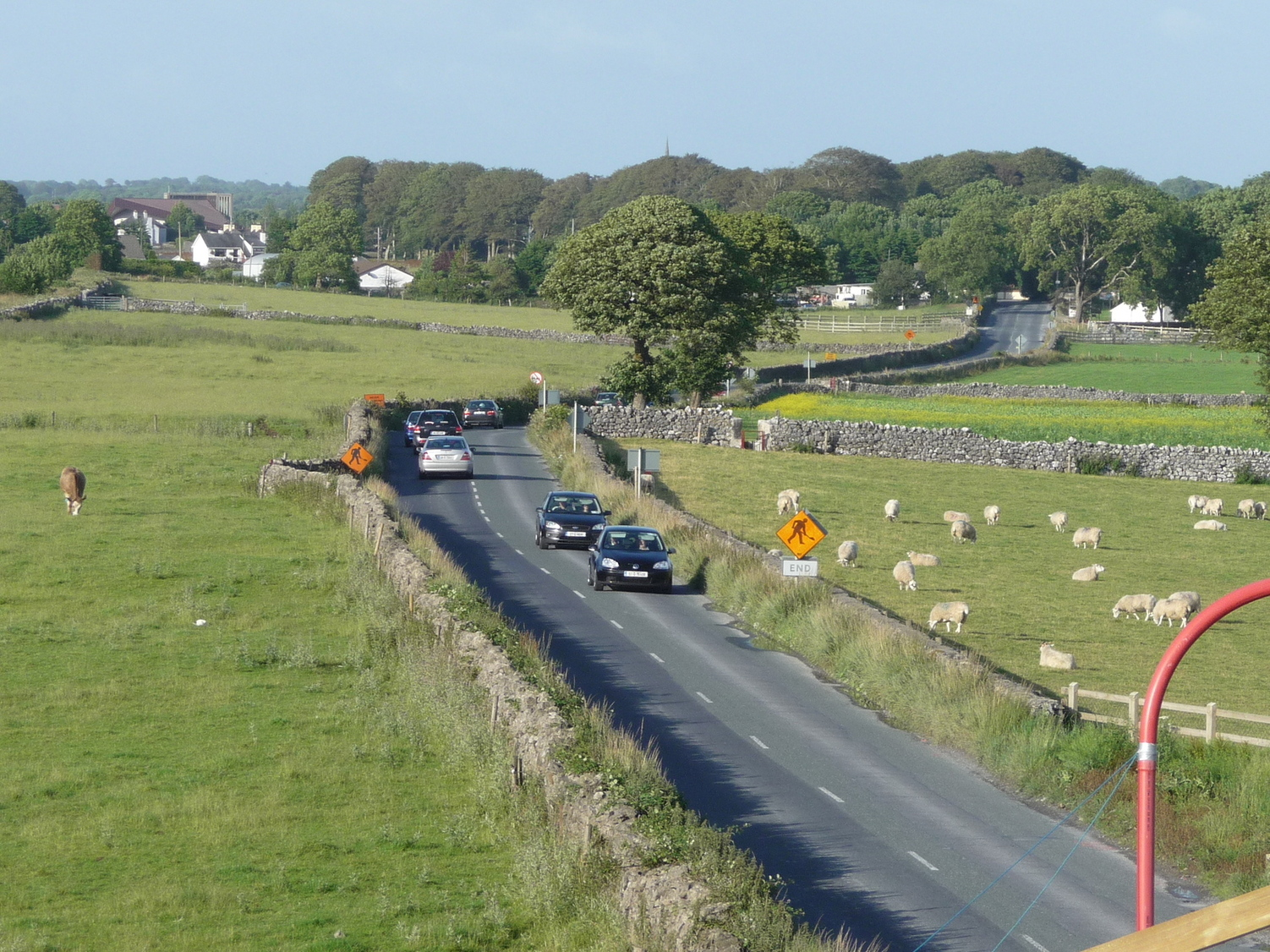
R348 Southwest of Athenry. Looking towards the town (note the parish church in the left-background).

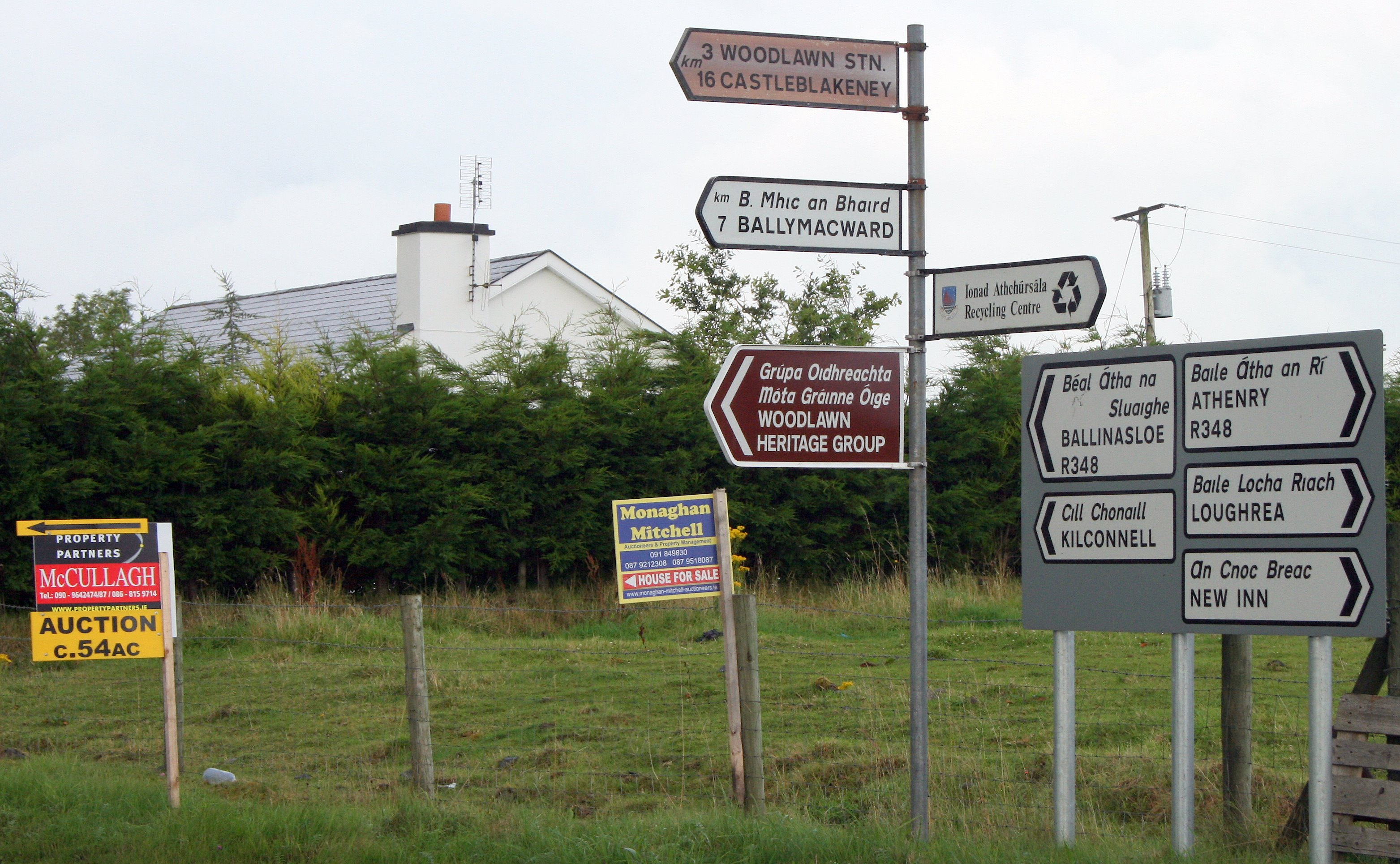
Information at the junction with the R359, 2 km from Woodlawn railway station

== See also ==
- Roads in Ireland
- National primary road
- National secondary road
