= Clonin Earthworks =

National Monument in County Offaly, Ireland

- Créfort an Chluainín (Irish)
- Location within Ireland
- 53.351406°N 7.210126°W
- Type: Ringfort
- Location: Clonin, Offerlane, County Offaly, Ireland

National monument of Ireland
- Official name: Clonfin
- Reference no.: 532

The Clonin Earthworks, also called the Bull Ring, are a series of earthworks, and a National Monument, located in County Offaly, Ireland.

== Location ==
The Clonin Earthworks are located on Clonin Hill, between the Monagh River and the Yellow River. They are 800 m (½ mile) west of Rhode.

== Description ==
This barrow is composed of a circular, flat-topped mound enclosed by an inner fosse, surrounded by a fence. It is circular and roughly 30 metres (33 yd) in diameter. The stone and earth bank and the inner ditch are quite well preserved, though partially destroyed in the northeast corner. The top of the mound rises to about 1.5 metres (4.9 ft).
