= Simonstown, Kilbride =

Simonstown
- Townland
- Location in Ireland
- Country: Ireland
- Province: Leinster
- County: Westmeath
- Civil Parish: Kilbride

Simonstown is a townland in County Westmeath, Ireland. The townland is located in the civil parish of Kilbride. The R400 regional road runs through the middle of the area. The townland is to the south of Mullingar, and the north of Rochfortbridge.
