= R358 road =

R358 road may refer to:

- R358 road (Ireland)
- R358 road (South Africa)
