= Moorerow or Tonlegee =

Townland in County Westmeath, Ireland

Moorerow or Tongelee is a townland in County Westmeath, Ireland. The townland is located in the civil parish of Kilbride. It is situated between the N52 Motorway and the R400 regional road, to the south of Mullingar.
