= Ballintlevy =

Townland in the civil parish of Enniscoffey in County Westmeath, Ireland

Ballintlevy is a townland in the civil parish of Enniscoffey in County Westmeath, Ireland.

The townland is located to the south of Mullingar, to the north of Rochfortbridge and Milltownpass, and to the east of Lough Ennell.
