= R358 road (Ireland) =

Road in Ireland

R358 road
- Bóthar R358
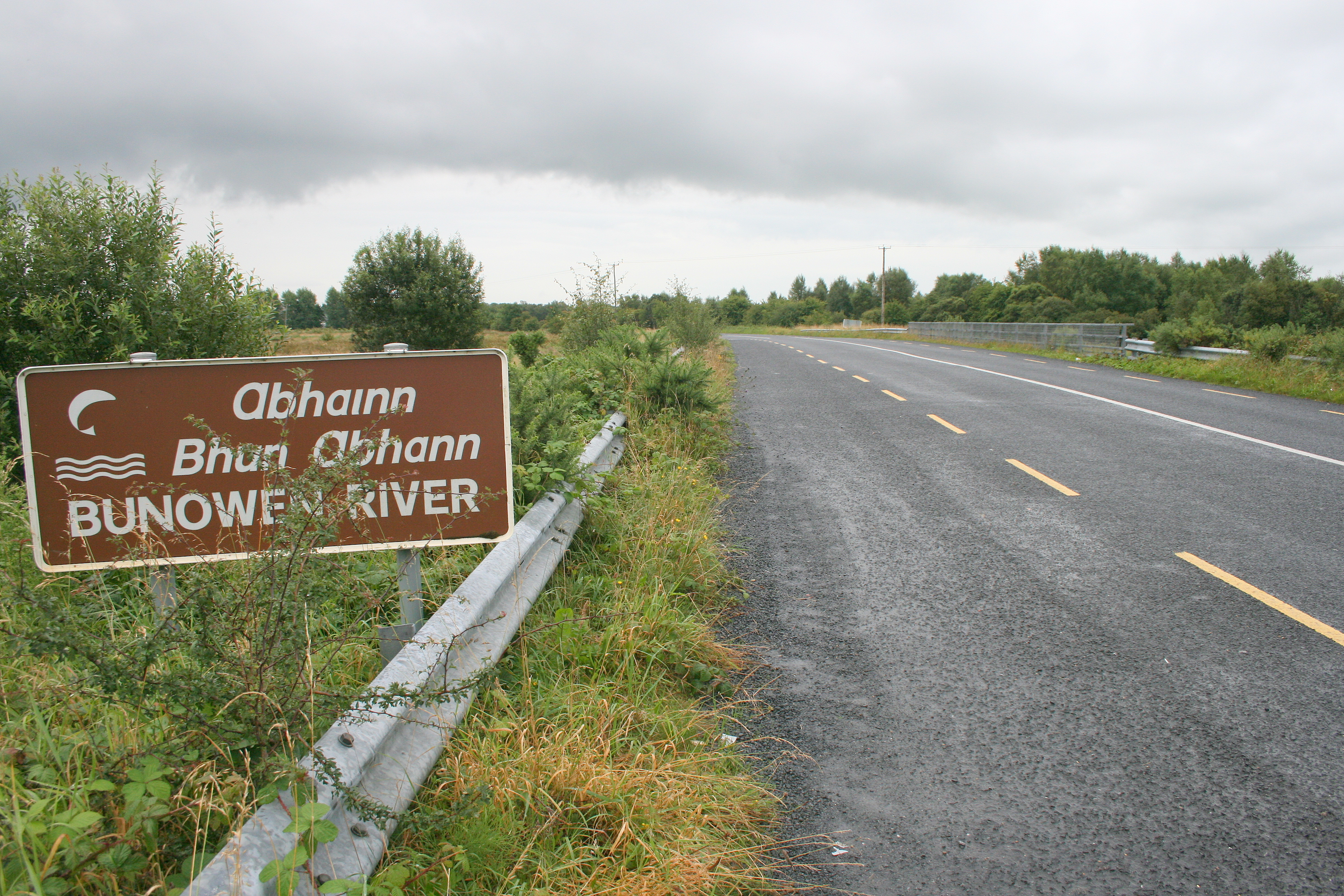
- R358 crossing the Bunowen River near Ballinasloe

Route information
- Length: 27 km (17 mi)

Location
- Country: Ireland
- Primary destinations: County Galway; Mountbellew – leave the N63; (R359); (R339); Caltra; Ballybaun; Kilglass; Ahascragh; (R348); Ballinasloe – terminates at R446

Highway system
- Roads in Ireland; Motorways; Primary; Secondary; Regional

The R358 road is a regional road in Ireland linking the N63 at Mountbellew to the R446 at Ballinasloe, all in County Galway. The road is 27 km (17 mi) long.

== Notable road traffic incidents ==
In 2018, two women in their 50s were killed when they were struck by a car which had collided with a second car on the R358 at Station Road, Ballinasloe.

In 2019 a nine year old girl was killed and her seven year old brother seriously injured while cycling near their home on the R358.

In 2022, three men were injured, one seriously, in a road traffic collision on the R358 at Treanrevagh, Mountbellew.

== See also ==
- Roads in Ireland
- National primary road
- National secondary road
