= Enniscoffey (townland) =

Townland in County Westmeath, Ireland

Enniscoffey also known as Caran is a townland in the civil parish of the same name in County Westmeath, Ireland.

The townland is located to the south of Mullingar, to the north of Rochfortbridge and Milltownpass, and to the east of Lough Ennell. A section of Milltownpass Bog stands on the townland.
