= Cushina =

Townland in County Offaly, Ireland

Coordinates: 53°12′N 7°10′W

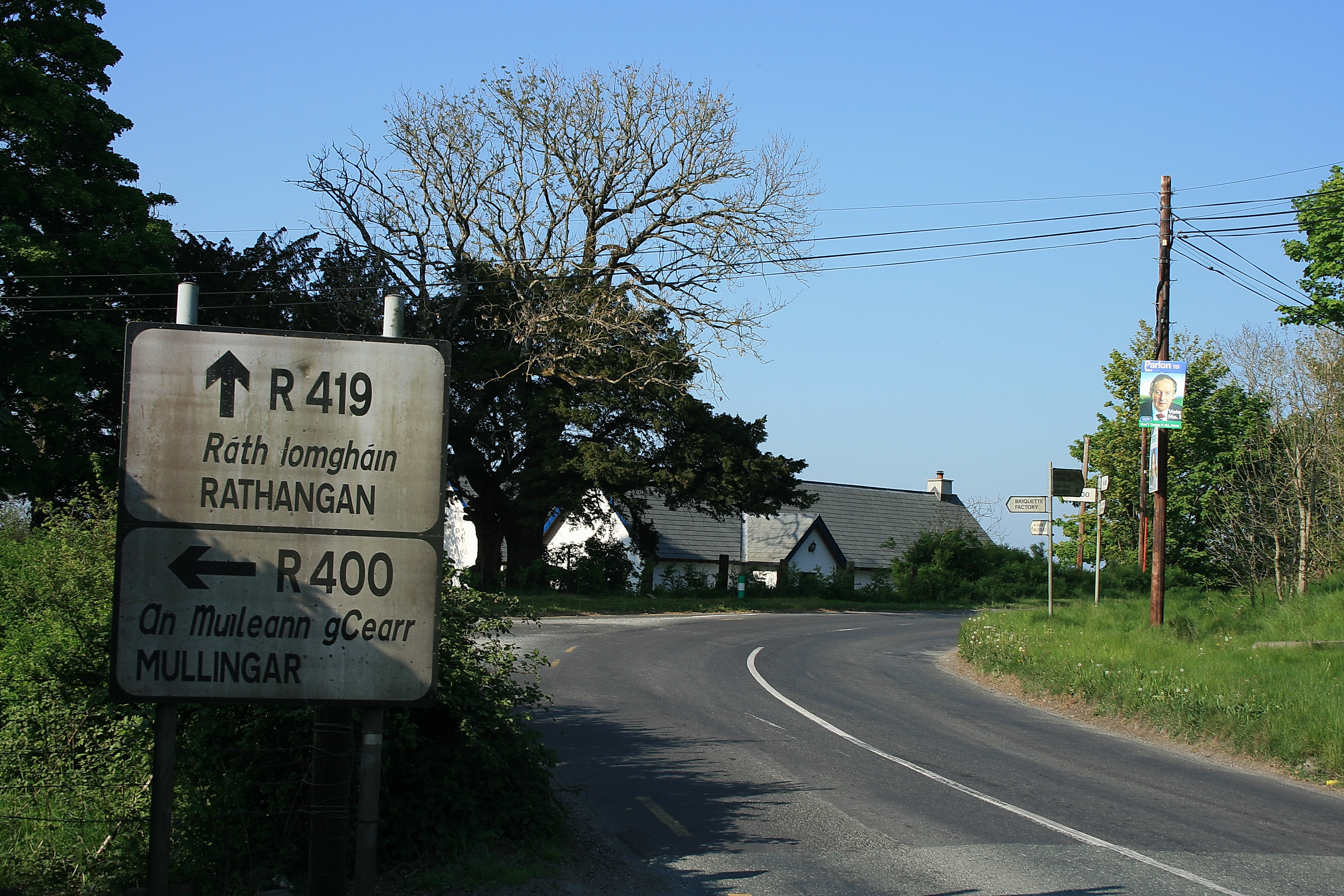
Road junction at Cushina

Cushina (Irish: Cois Eidhní) is a townland in County Offaly on the Cushina River at the junction of the R400 and R419 regional roads.

It is 4 km north of Portarlington.

== See also ==
- List of townlands of County Offaly
