= Castleblakeney =

Village in County Galway, Ireland

Coordinates: 53°26′N 8°29′W

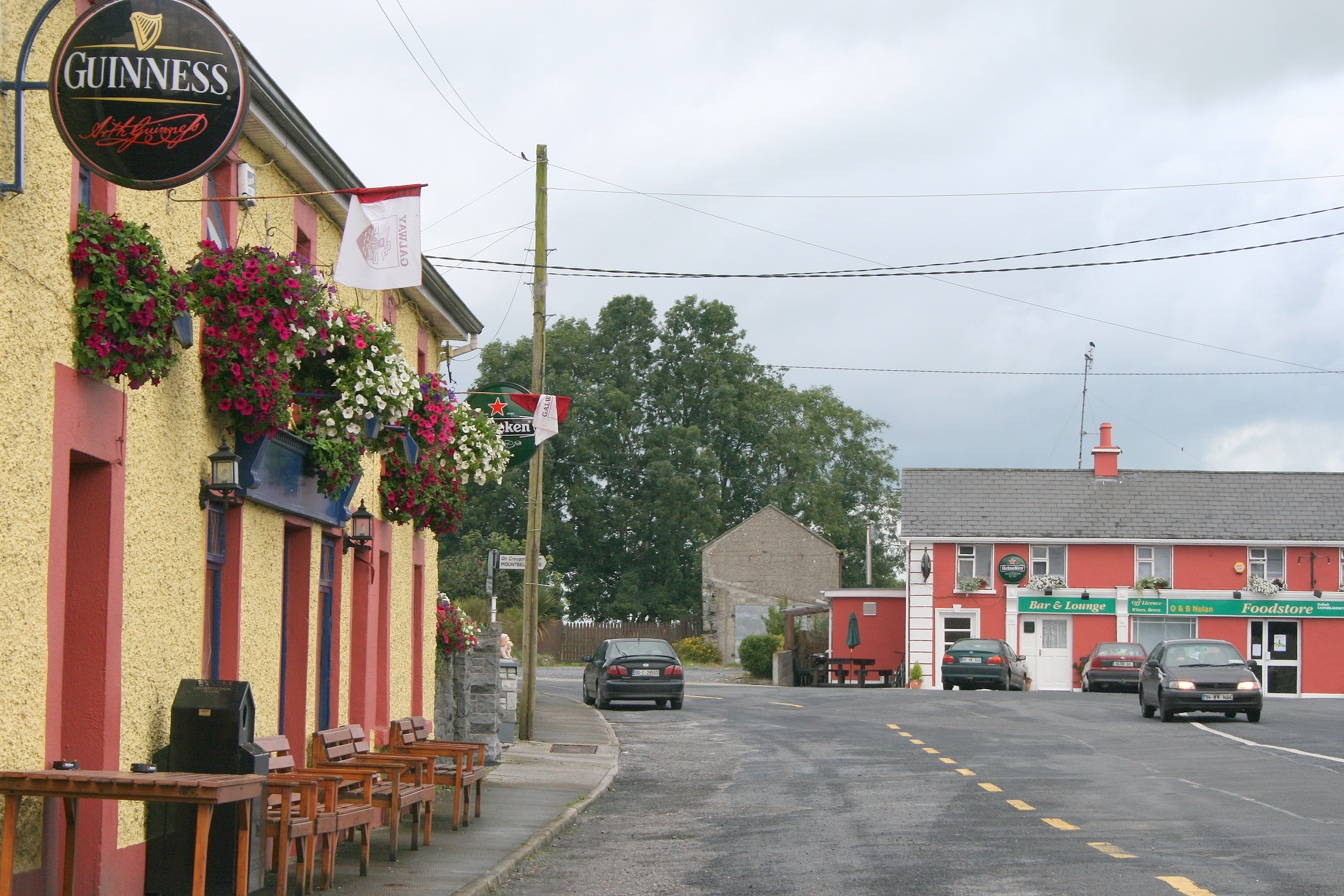
Castleblakeney

Castleblakeney, historically Gallagh (Irish: Gallach Uí Cheallaigh), is a village in County Galway, Ireland. It is at the crossroads of the R359 and R339 regional roads, 5km south of the town of Mountbellew.

== See also ==
- List of towns and villages in Ireland
