= Woodlawn, County Galway =

Settled area in County Galway, Ireland

Coordinates: 53°19′56″N 8°28′59″W

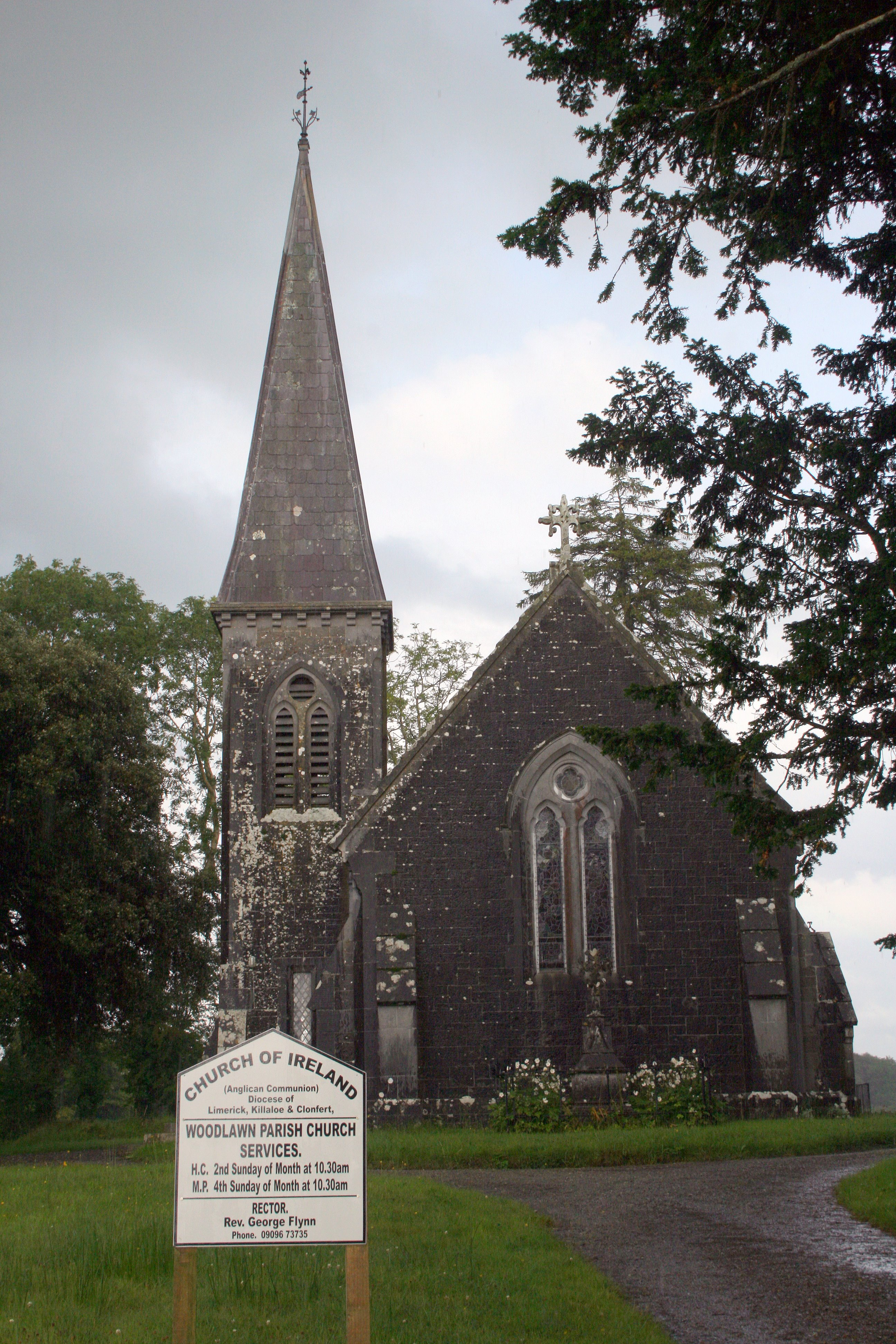
Woodlawn Church of Ireland parish church

Woodlawn (Irish: Móta; historically known as Mota or Moote) is a settled area in County Galway, Ireland.

== Location ==
Woodlawn lies on the R359 regional road, between the main road and rail networks which traverse the area east-west, 5 km (3.1 mi) west of Kilconnell, 16 km (9.9 mi) from Ballinasloe and approximately 48 km (30 mi) from the city of Galway. Woodlawn House and its demesne are in the townlands of Woodlawn and Killaan, while the broader area also features Woodlawn railway station, a post office and a Church of Ireland parish church.

== Transport ==
Woodlawn railway station was built by the second Lord Ashtown, and opened on 1 August 1858. It was closed for goods traffic on 2 June 1978. It is on the main Iarnród Éireann Intercity line from Dublin to Galway, situated between Ballinasloe and Attymon halt stations, and still open for some passenger business.

== Features ==
=== Woodlawn House ===
Woodlawn House, about 19 km (12 mi) north-west of Ballinasloe, is the former seat of the Trench family, holders of the title Baron (Lord) Ashtown. This large Italianate building was built in the late 18th century by Frederic Trench, 1st Baron Ashtown, of Moate, and extended and remodelled in the mid-19th century, following the marriage of his nephew, Frederic Mason Trench, 2nd Baron Ashtown, to his second wife, Elizabeth Oliver Gascoigne of Castle Oliver, Limerick.

The house was vacated and the furnishings sold when the third Lord Ashtown became bankrupt in the 1920s, and eventually it was sold by the fourth Lord Ashtown to a cousin, Derek Le Poer Trench, in 1947. In 1973, it was sold on to a local farmer, and it changed hands further thereafter, being held by a local publican from 1989 to 2001, and then sold on with its remaining 115 acres of land. As of 2019, and unoccupied for over 40 years, it had suffered fire damage in 1982, and been partly repaired with an emergency Heritage Council grant.

It has 35,000 sq ft of space, and more than fifty rooms, with the central part comprising three storeys over a basement, and two two-storey wings.

The estate also includes a family mausoleum, a walled garden, an orchard, stables, two staff houses and some cottages. There is also a lake.

== Religion ==
There is a Church of Ireland church, within the parish group of Aughrim, in the ancient Diocese of Clonfert, now within the United Diocese of Limerick and Killaloe. It was designed in 1860 and built in 1874 for Lord Ashtown, by James Forth Kempster. It has a four-bay nave, a vestry and bell tower, carved wooden pulpit and lectern, and stained glass windows.

== See also ==
- List of towns and villages in Ireland
