= Yellow River (County Offaly) =

River in Ireland

- Native name: An Abhainn Bhuí (Irish)

Location
- Country: Ireland

Physical characteristics
- Source
  - location: Kilcorbry, County Offaly
  - elevation: 95 m (312 ft)
- Mouth: River Boyne
  - location: Castlejordan, County Meath
- Length: 21 km (13 mi)
- Basin size: 44.5 km^{2} (17.2 sq mi)
- Discharge
  - average: 0.13 m^{3}/s (4.6 cu ft/s)

Basin features
- Tributaries
  - left: Monagh River

The Yellow River (Irish: An Abhainn Bhuí) is a river in central Ireland, a tributary of the River Boyne.

== Name ==
The Yellow River is called the Ownaboy/Ownaboy in the 1654 Civil Survey, an Anglicisation of abhainn buidhe, "yellow river."

== Course ==
The Yellow River rises in Kilcorbry, north of Croghan (near 53.351°N 7.302°W) and flows in an easterly direction. It passes under the R400 and then turns northeast, flowing under Garr Bridge It meets several tributaries and then its last section forms part of the Meath–Offaly border and passes under Sheep Bridge south of Castlejordan. It meets the Monagh River and then passes under Clongall Bridge and later enters the Boyne near 53.3818°N 7.0816°W. From the tripoint of the townlands Stonehouse, Killowen (both in County Offaly) and Ballyfore (County Meath) (53.3956°N 7.1421°W) until the junction with the River Boyne the Yellow River forms the boundary of counties Offaly and Meath.

== Wildlife ==
The Yellow River is known as a brown trout fishery.

== See also ==
- Rivers of Ireland
