= Castlelost (civil parish) =

Civil parish in County Westmeath, Ireland

Castlelost Caisleán Loiste
- Civil parish
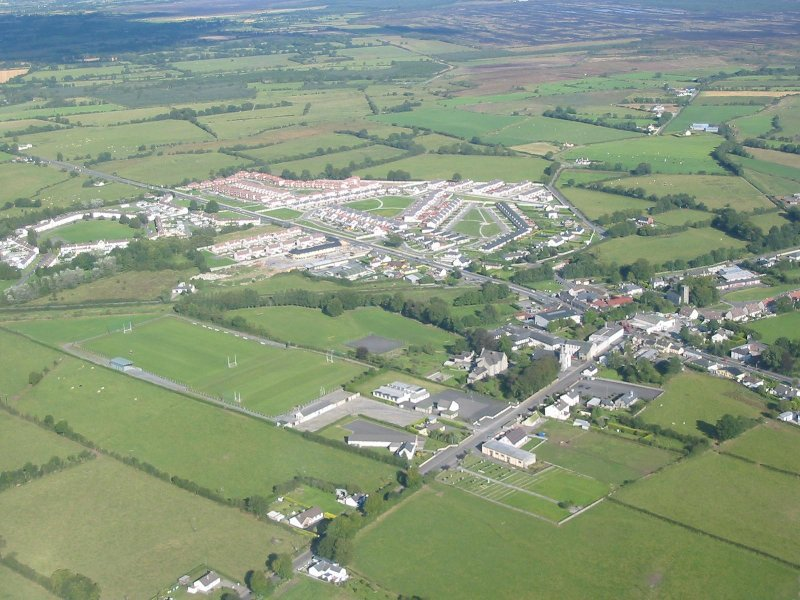
- The village of Rochfortbridge lies within Castlelost parish

- Location of Castlelost within County Westmeath, Ireland
- Coordinates: 53°24′49″N 7°17′39″W
- Country: Ireland
- Province: Leinster
- County: County Westmeath
- Irish grid reference: N469405

Castlelost (Irish: Caisleán Loiste) is a civil parish in County Westmeath, Ireland. It is located about 13 km (8 mi) south of Mullingar.

Castlelost is one of 10 civil parishes in the barony of Fartullagh in the province of Leinster. The civil parish covers 9,444.4 acres (38.2 km^{2}).

Castlelost civil parish comprises the village of Rochfortbridge and 16 townlands: Castlelost, Castlelost West, Clontytallon, Derry, Farthingstown, Gallstown, Garrane, Gneevebane, Gortumly, Kilbrennan, Kiltotan and Collinstown, Oldtown, Piercetown, and Rahanine.

The neighbouring civil parishes are: Carrick, Kilbride and Pass of Kilbride to the north, Castlejordan (County Meath) to the east, Castlejordan (County Offaly), Croghan (County Offaly) and Newtown to the south and Clonfad to the West.
