= Castlejordan (civil parish) =

Castlejordan Caisleán Shiurdáin
- Civil parish
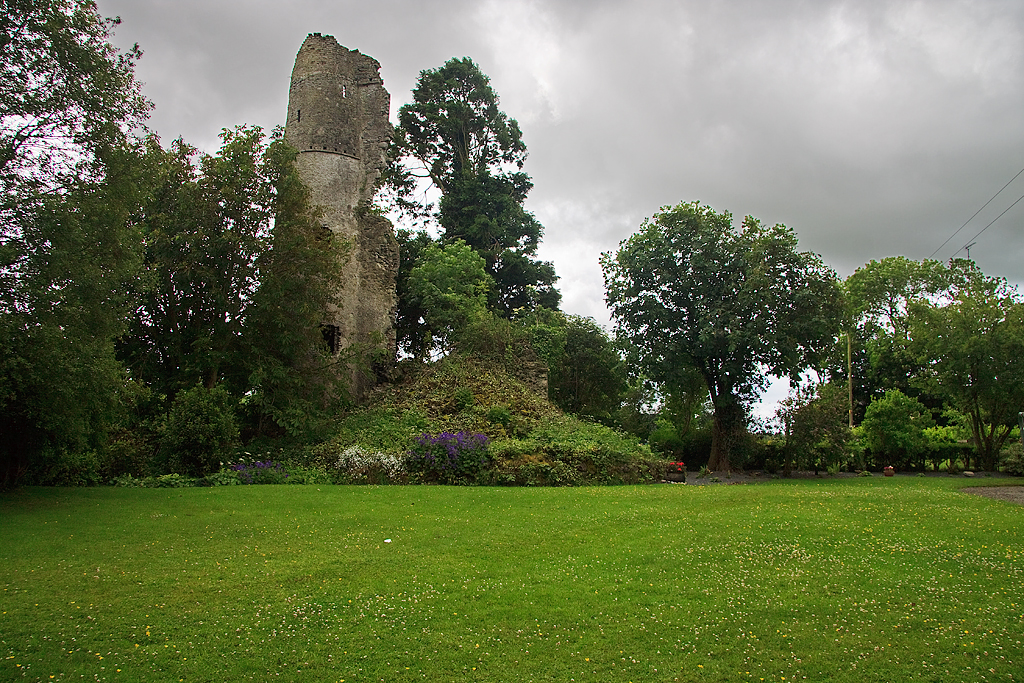
- Castle Jordan

- Location in County Meath and County Offaly, in Ireland
- Coordinates: 53°24′49″N 7°17′39″W
- Country: Ireland
- Province: Leinster
- County: County Meath
- Irish grid reference: N576414

Castlejordan (Irish: Caisleán Shiurdáin) is a civil parish in County Meath and County Offaly, Ireland. It is located to the south of Kinnegad.

Castlejordan lies in the baronies of Coolestown, Upper Moyfenrath and Warrenstown.

Castlejordan civil parish comprises 27 townlands, with 15 in County Meath and 12 in County Offaly. The townlands in Castlejordan are: Ballydonnell, Ballyfore, Ballynagalshy, Baltigeer, Baltinoran, Cappaboggan, Castlejordan, Clongall, Derryhinch, Gortnahorna, Kildangan, Kilkeeran, Lewellensland, Toor, Toornafolla, Carrick, Clonlack, Clonmeen, Clonmore, Corbetstown, Derrygreenagh, Garr, Killowen, Knockdrin, Stonehouse, Toberdaly

The neighbouring civil parishes are: Balfeaghan to the north and east, Croghan, Ballyburly and Ballymacwilliam to the south and Pass of Kilbride and Castlelost to the west.
