= Cannakill =

Abandoned village in County Offaly, Ireland

- Cill Mhic Caille (Irish)
- Location within Ireland
- 53°20′45″N 7°17′31″W
- Type: Abandoned village
- Periods: Norman Ireland
- Location: Cannakill, Croghan, County Offaly, Ireland

History
- Built: Early 13th century AD
- Abandoned: After 1385

National monument of Ireland
- Official name: Cannakill
- Reference no.: 617

Cannakill is an abandoned village located in County Offaly, Ireland.

== Location ==
Cannakill is located to the west of Croghan Hill, south of the Yellow River and about 1 km (1,100 yd) northwest of Croghan village.

== History and archaeology ==
In Irish, the village is called Cill Mhic Caille, "church of the son of Caill," but scholars believe it is a corruption of ceann na coille, "head of the forest."

Cannakill was one of many villages built by Ireland's Norman conquerors after the Norman invasion of Ireland (late 12th century). When the Gaelic Irish lords (the Ua Conchobhair Failghe — O'Connor Faly) regained control of the area after the Battle of Tochar Cruachain-Bri-Ele (1385), the village was abandoned.

Remnants include a ruined church, graveyard and several mounds (still visible as circular cropmarks); a ruined castle of the Ua Conchobhair Failghe is located to the southwest.
