= R359 road (Ireland) =

Road in Ireland

R359 road
- Bóthar R359
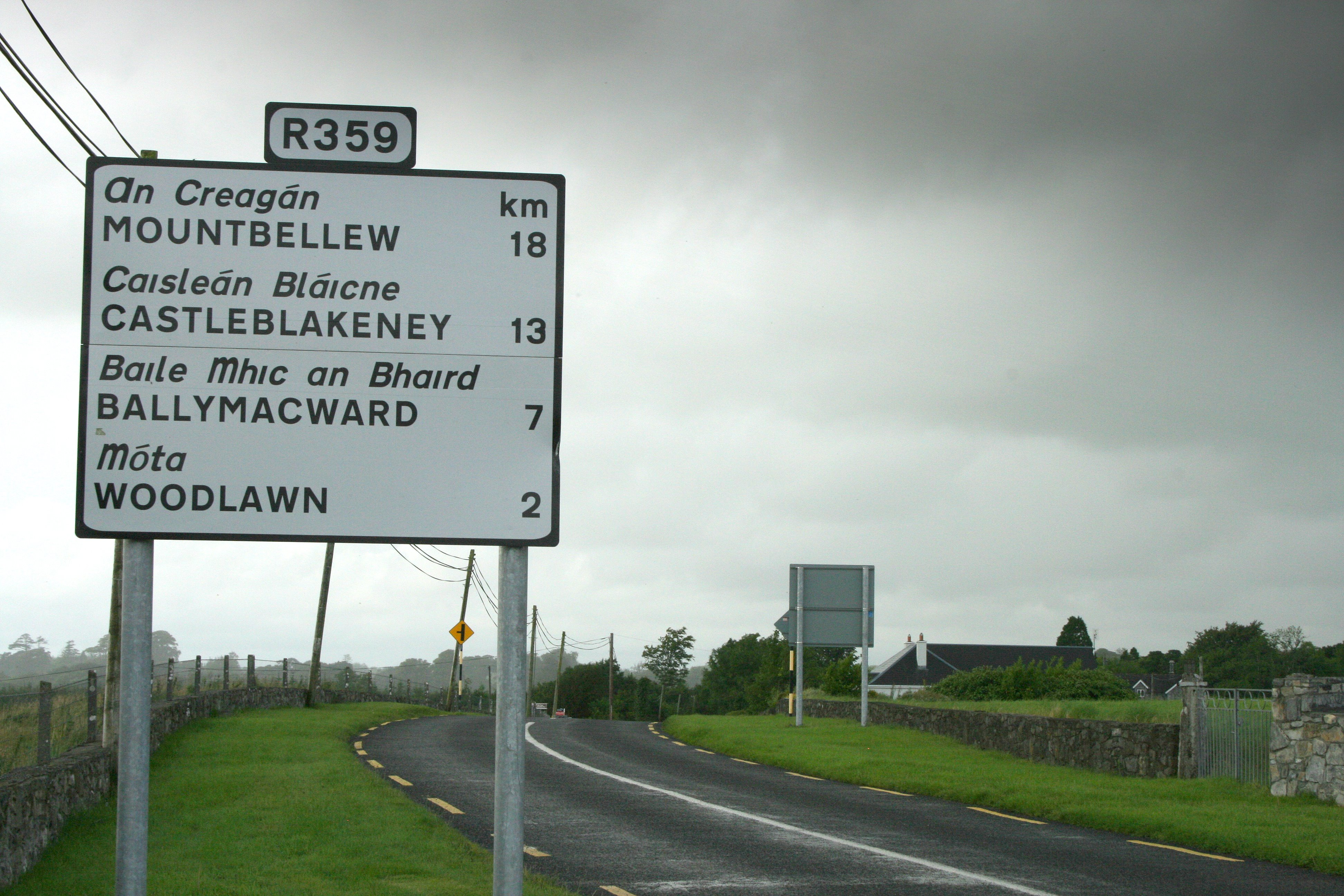
- At the southern end, near Woodlawn

Route information
- Length: 16 km (9.9 mi)

Location
- Country: Ireland
- Primary destinations: County Galway; Starts at a junction with the R348; Woodlawn; Crosses the Dublin-Galway railway line at Woodlawn railway station; Ballymacward; Castleblakeney – (R339); Terminates at the R358 3km south of Mountbellew

Highway system
- Roads in Ireland; Motorways; Primary; Secondary; Regional

The R359 road is a regional road in Ireland stretching north-south for 16 km between Mountbellew and Woodlawn in County Galway. En route it passes through Castleblakeney and Ballymacward.

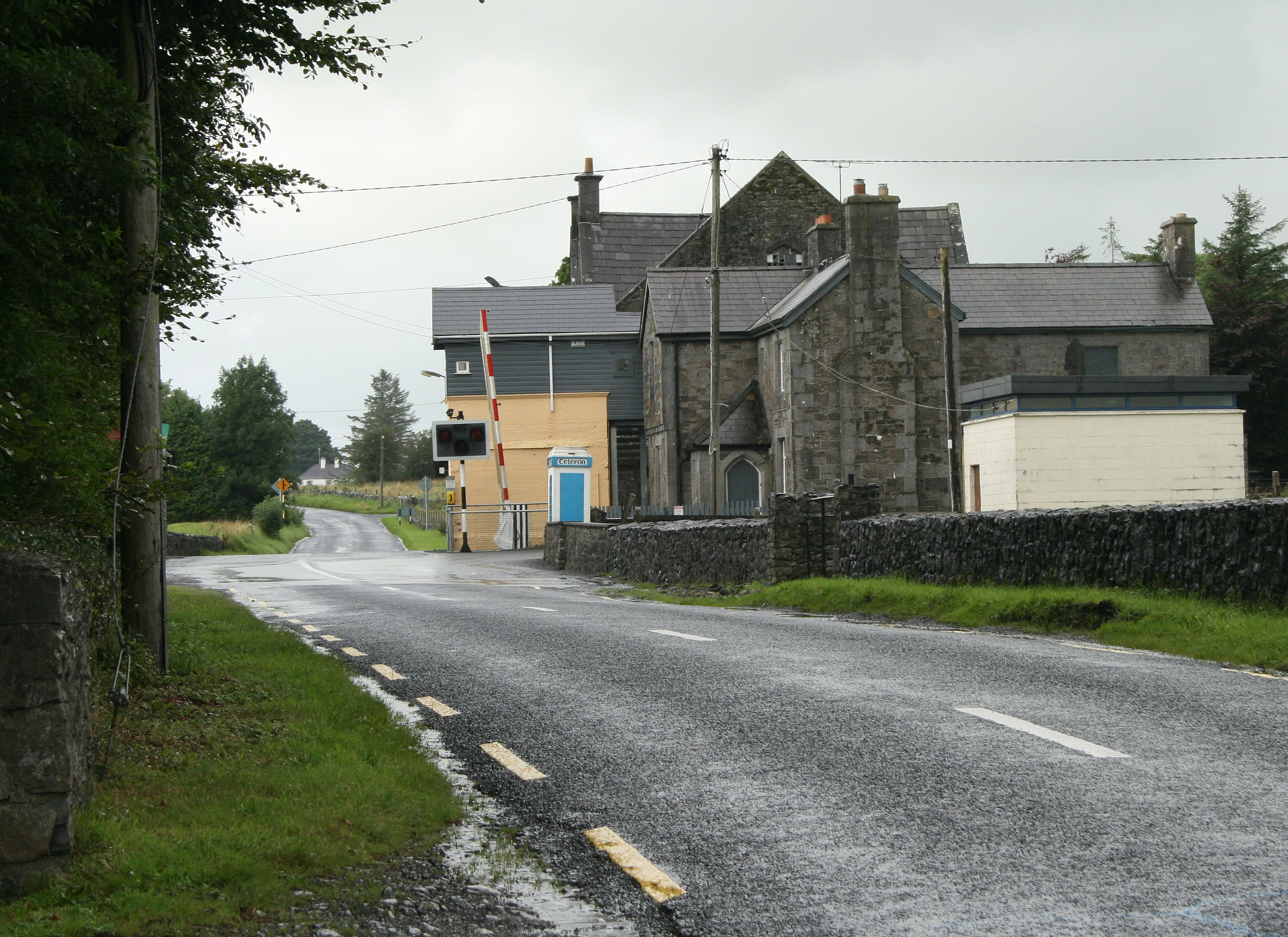
R359 at Woodlawn railway station

== See also ==
- Roads in Ireland
- National primary road
- National secondary road
