= Moylisker =

Civil parish in County Westmeath, Ireland

Moylisker Maoileiscir
- Civil parish
- Location of Moylisker within County Westmeath in Ireland
- Coordinates: 53°28′12″N 7°21′16″W
- Country: Ireland
- Province: Leinster
- County: County Westmeath
- Irish grid reference: N429468

Moylisker (Irish: Maoileiscir) is a civil parish in County Westmeath, Ireland. It is located about 6 km (3.7 mi) south of Mullingar.

Moylisker is one of 10 civil parishes in the barony of Fartullagh in the province of Leinster. The civil parish covers 2,286.3 acres (9.252 km^{2}).

Moylisker civil parish comprises 8 townlands: Anneville a.k.a. Rathduff, Belvidere, Dunboden Demesne, Paslicktown, Prebaun, Rathduff a.k.a. Anneville, Rochfort Demesne, Tallyho and Tyrrellstown.

The neighbouring civil parishes are: Lynn to the north, Enniscoffey to the east and Carrick and Kilbride to the south.
