= Bellfield, County Westmeath =

Townland in County Westmeath, Ireland

Bellfield also known as Brannockstown is a townland in the civil parish of Enniscoffey in County Westmeath, Ireland.

The townland is located to the northwest of Milltownpass, with the Milltown river forming its western border with the townland of Gaybrook Demesne and Gaulstown.
