= Lynn (civil parish) =

Civil parish in County Westmeath, Ireland

Lynn Lainn
- Civil parish
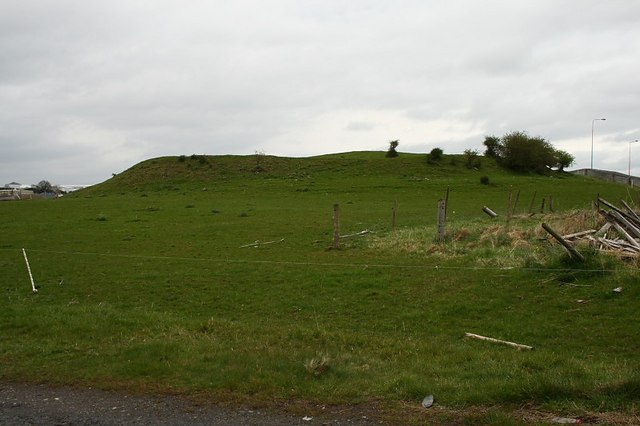
- Ring fort in the northwestern part of Lynn parish

- Location of Lynn within County Westmeath in Ireland
- Coordinates: 53°29′17″N 7°19′28″W
- Country: Ireland
- Province: Leinster
- County: County Westmeath
- Irish grid reference: N448488

Lynn (Irish: Lainn) is a civil parish in County Westmeath, Ireland. It is located about 4 kilometres (2.5 mi) south–south–east of Mullingar.

Lynn is one of 10 civil parishes in the barony of Fartullagh in the province of Leinster. The civil parish covers 4,905.3 acres (19.851 km^{2}).

Lynn civil parish comprises 12 townlands: Ardillon, Burnellstown, Catherinestown, Clonmoyle, Corbally, Gainestown, Glendevine, Gorteen, Lynn, Tornanstown. Tullanisky and Vilanstown.

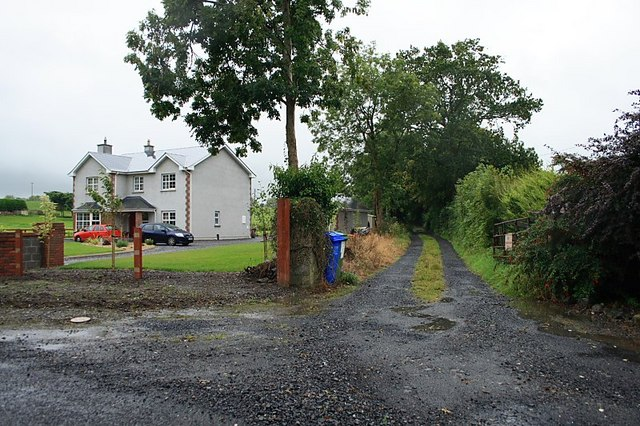
House and country lane in Lynn

The neighbouring civil parishes are: Mullingar to the north, Killucan (barony of Farbill), to the east and Enniscoffey and Moylisker to the south.

A well-preserved ring fort can be seen in Lynn townland in the northwestern part of the parish, near the boundary with Mullingar parish.

In the early fourteenth century, the manor of Lynn was bought from the de Pitchford family by the English-born judge Sir John de Fressingfield and his wife Alice. Sir John applied for permission to endow a chantry there.
