= Kilbrennan =

Townland in County Westmeath, Ireland

Kilbrennan is a townland in County Westmeath, Ireland. The townland is located in the civil parish Castlelost. The N52 is to the west of the area, connecting the towns of Mullingar and Tyrrellspass.
