= Whitewell, County Westmeath =

Townland in County Westmeath, Ireland

Whitewell is a townland in County Westmeath, Ireland. The townland is located in the civil parish of Kilbride. The R400 regional road cuts through the east of the townland as it connects the towns of Rochfortbridge and Mullingar.
