= Bog of Allen =

Large raised bog in Leinster, Ireland

Coordinates: 53.28°N 6.96°W

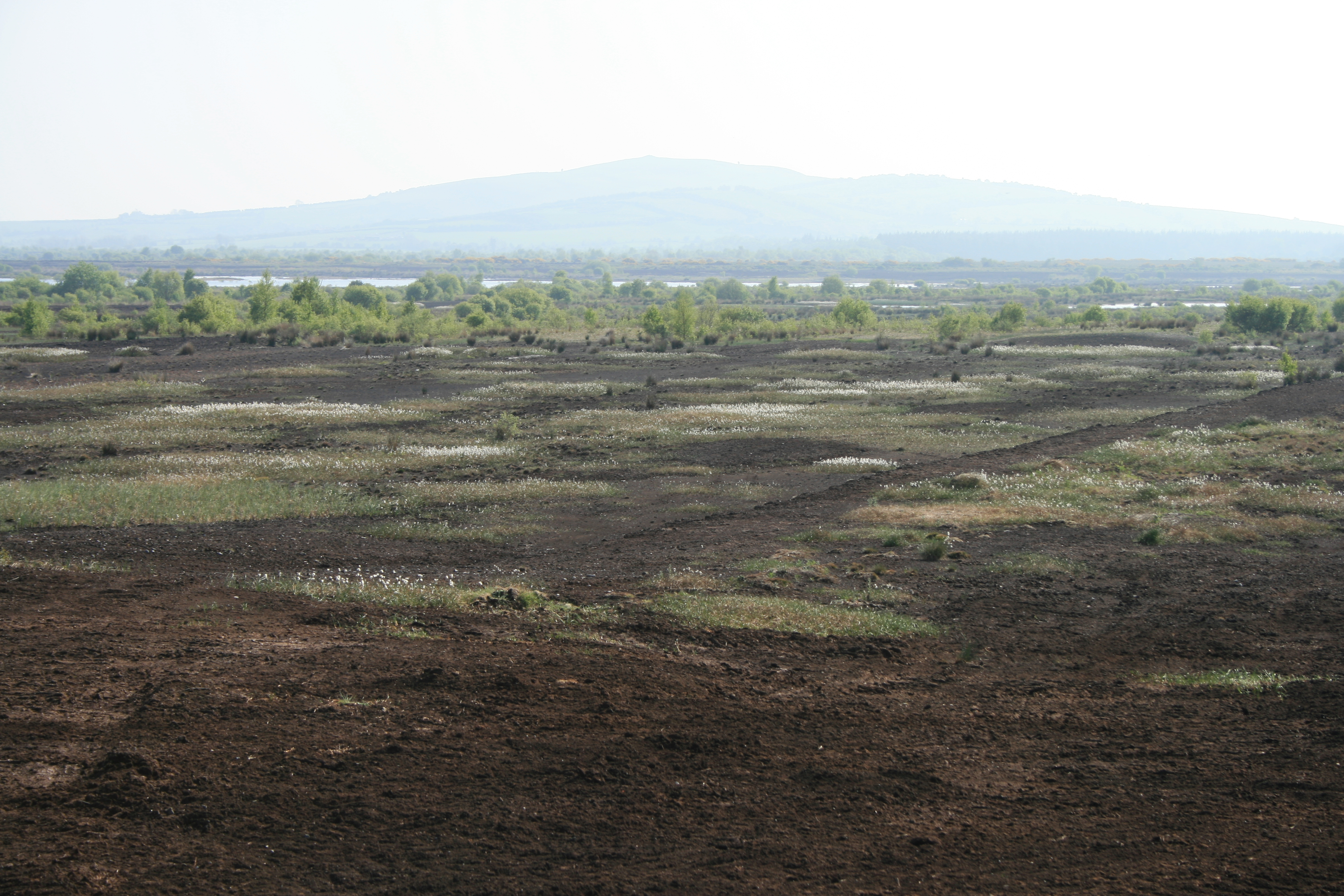
Bog of Allen - Croghan Hill, Offaly, in the distance

The Bog of Allen (Irish: Móin Alúine) is a large raised bog in the centre of Ireland between the rivers Liffey and Shannon.

The bog's 958 square kilometres (370 square miles) stretch into counties Offaly, Meath, Kildare, Laois, and Westmeath. Peat was mechanically harvested on a large scale by Bórd na Móna, the government-owned peat production industry, till Bórd na Móna ceased all mechanical harvesting of peat in 2015. The area has kilometres of narrow gauge industrial railways for transporting turf to processing plants and turf powered power plants. In addition, the cutover portions are used as area for grazing. The bog is crossed by the Grand Canal and the Royal Canal.

== Preservationists ==
The Irish Peatland Conservation Council describes the bog as "an important area of peatland, as much a part of Irish natural heritage as the Book of Kells." The bog is much reduced after centuries of industrial exploitation and recent encroachments by development. Efforts are underway to preserve sections of it.

== Archaeological significance ==
The peatlands of the Bog of Allen contain a valuable part of the archaeological record. Due to the special preservation conditions within peat, many kinds of artefact which do not normally survive are preserved; these include wooden structures and objects. In many parts of the Bog of Allen industrial milling has uncovered archaeological remains such as trackways. These trackways are wooden walkways constructed through prehistory and into the medieval period which allowed people and animals to cross the extensive areas of peatland, which can give us an insight into the economy and way of life of the societies that existed around the bog. The preservation conditions in bogs also preserve a range of palaeoenvironmental evidence such as pollen and plant macrofossils which are often studied alongside the archaeological evidence to inform about the environment on and around the bog.

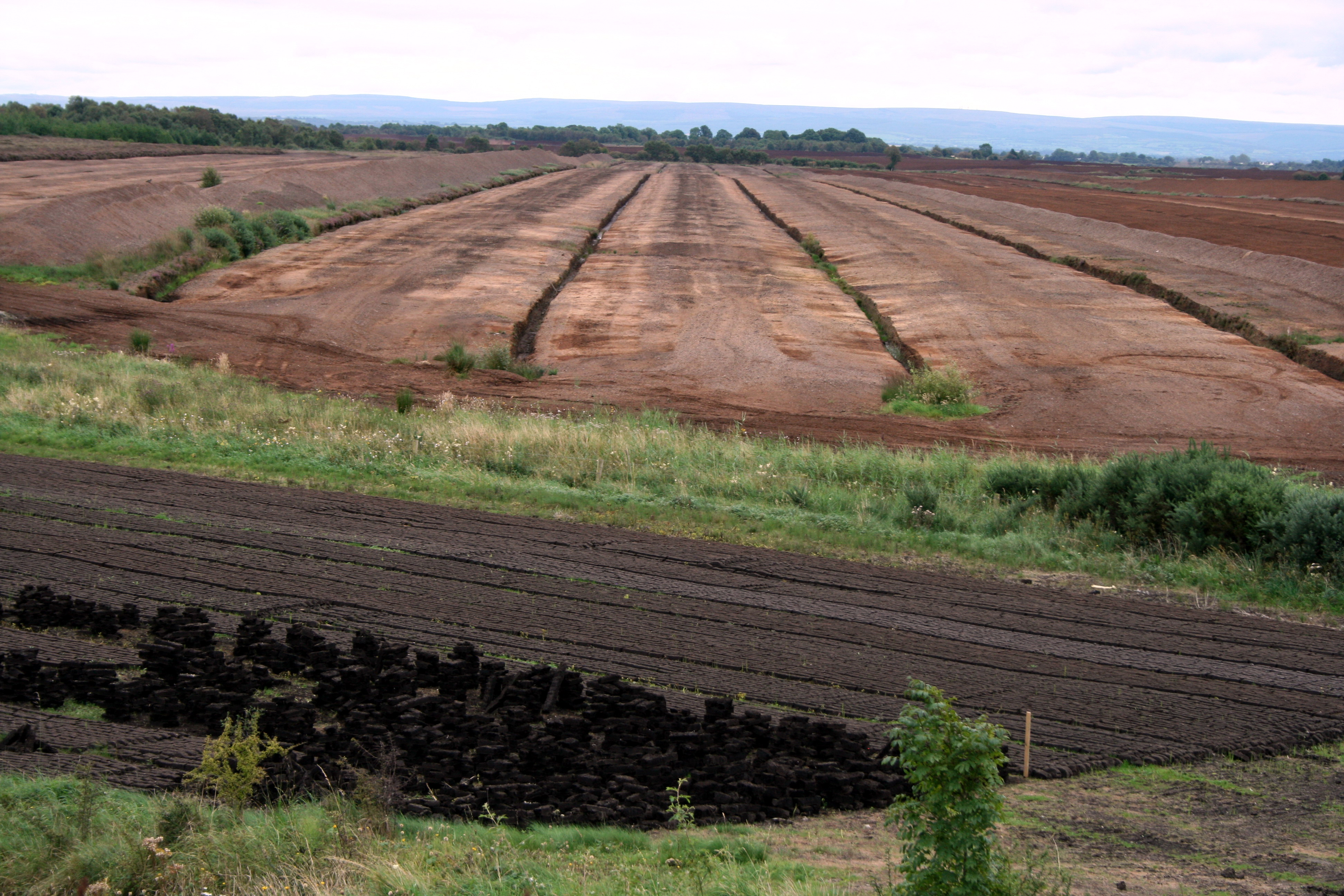
Industrial peat harvesting in a section of the Bog of Allen in County Offaly.

== Palaeoenvironmental studies ==
Numerous studies have focused on reconstructing past environments through the study of palaeoenvironmental proxies preserved in the Bog of Allen. Bogs such as these are of particular interest as ombrotrophic bogs are very sensitive to changes in precipitation. A current study carried out on Daingean Bog is investigating the use of testate amoebae to reconstruct changes in precipitation and to link this to climate variability during the Holocene. Such studies are of value as they may be informative about the response of past societies to climate change.

== See also ==
- Geography of Ireland
- Hill of Allen
- Allen, County Kildare
- Milltownpass Bog
- Cloncrow Bog
- Mongan Bog
