= Enniscoffey (civil parish) =

Civil parish in County Westmeath, Ireland

Enniscoffey Inis Cofaigh
- Civil parish
- Location of Enniscoffey in County Westmeath, Ireland
- Coordinates: 53°27′39″N 7°16′28″W
- Country: Ireland
- Province: Leinster
- County: County Westmeath
- Irish grid reference: N482458

Enniscoffey (Irish: Inis Cofaigh) is a civil parish in County Westmeath, Ireland. It is located about 8.5 km (5 mi) south–south–east of Mullingar.

Enniscoffey is one of ten civil parishes in the barony of Fartullagh in the province of Leinster. The civil parish covers 4,454.4 acres (18.026 km^{2}).

Enniscoffey civil parish comprises nine townlands: Ballintlevy, Bellfield (aka Brannockstown), Blackislands (aka Windmill), Brannockstown (aka Bellfield), Caran (aka Enniscoffey), Claremount (aka Cummingstown), Gaybrook Demesne, Lemongrove (aka Rathcam), and Mahonstown.

The neighbouring civil parishes are Lynn to the north, Killucan (barony of Farbill) to the east, Kilbride to the south and Pass of Kilbride and Moylisker to the west.
