= Carrick, County Westmeath (civil parish) =

Civil parish in County Westmeath, Ireland

Carrick An Charraig
- Civil parish
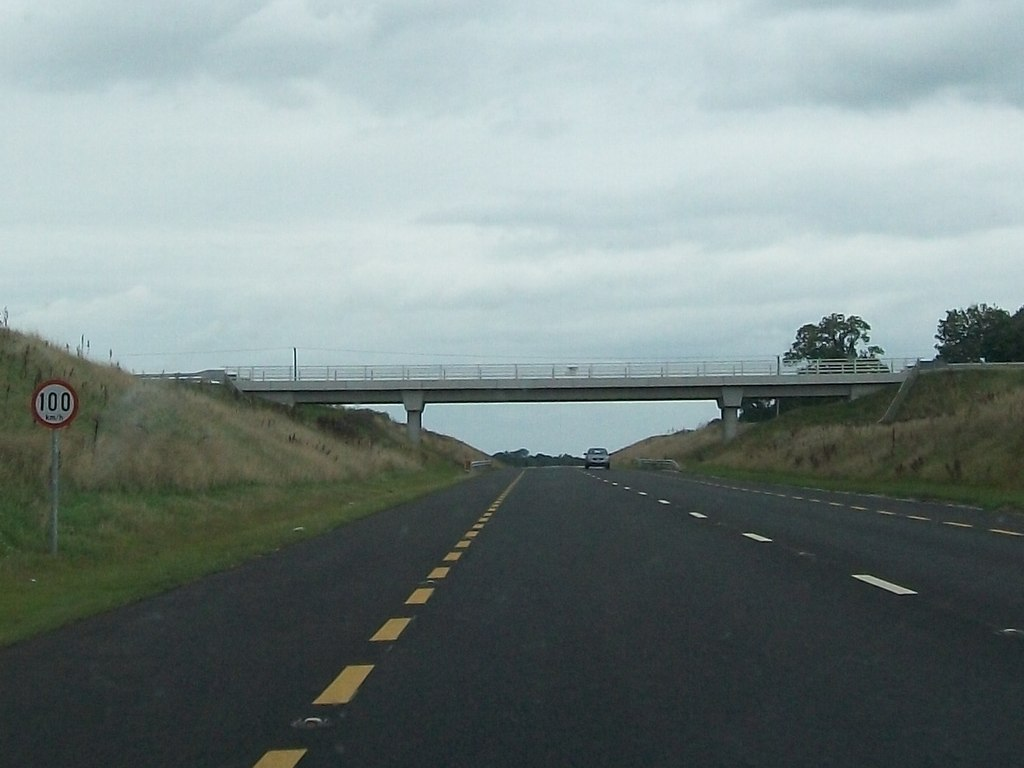
- N52 road passing through Carrick

- Location of Carrick within County Westmeath, Ireland
- Coordinates: 53°27′8″N 7°22′55″W
- Country: Ireland
- Province: Leinster
- County: County Westmeath
- Irish grid reference: N411448

Carrick (Irish: An Charraig) is a civil parish in County Westmeath, Ireland. It is located about 8 km (5 mi) south of Mullingar.

Carrick is one of 10 civil parishes in the barony of Fartullagh in the province of Leinster. The civil parish covers 3,292.4 acres (13.324 km^{2}).

Carrick civil parish comprises 6 townlands: Brackagh, Carrick, Gaddaghanstown, Higginstown, Robinstown and Walterstown.

The neighbouring civil parishes are: Moylisker to the north, Kilbride to the east and Castlelost and Clonfad to the south.

The N52 road passes through the parish approximately from south to north.
