= Carrick, County Westmeath =

Townland in County Westmeath, Ireland

Carrick is a townland in County Westmeath, Ireland. It lies within a civil parish of the same name. The N52 road cuts through the middle of the townland and Lough Ennell borders it to the west.

Carrick House, an 18th-century country house historically linked to the Fetherston-Haugh family, is in the area.
