= Woodlawn railway station =

Railway station in County Galway, Ireland

Coordinates: 53.3431°N 8.4714°W

Woodlawn Móta
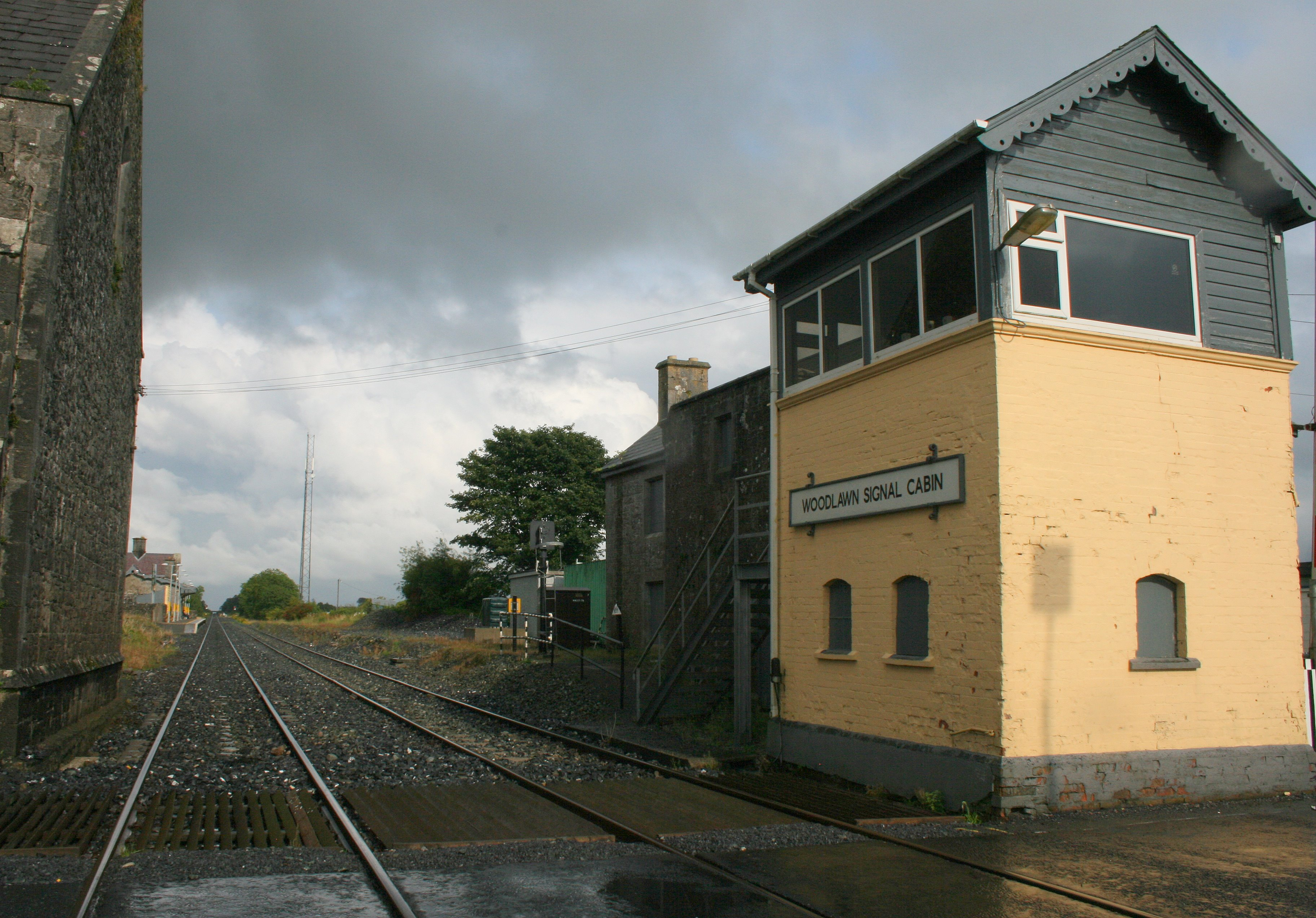
- Station (platform left) from the level crossing with R359 road

General information
- Location: Woodlawn, County Galway, H53 VK16; Ireland
- Owner: Iarnród Éireann
- Operator: Iarnród Éireann
- Platforms: 1
- Tracks: 2

Construction
- Structure type: At-grade

Other information
- Station code: WLAWN
- Fare zone: M

Key dates
- 1858: Station opened
- Iarnród Éireann; CIÉ; IÉ railway stations
Route map
Location

Woodlawn railway station is a railway station situated on the Dublin-Galway line. It is beside a level crossing on the R359 regional road in the village of Woodlawn in County Galway, Ireland.

The station is on the Dublin to Galway Rail service. Passengers to or from Westport travel to Athlone and change trains. Passengers to or from Limerick and Ennis travel to Athenry and change trains.

== History ==
The station opened on 1 August 1858 and was closed for goods traffic on 2 June 1978.

== Facilities ==
The station has an accessible waiting room and toilet. A ticket machine is located at the entrance to the platform. The car park is currently free of charge.

== Services ==
=== Local Request for better service ===
On 26 April 2011, a protest numbering some two hundred local people took place at the station. The local action group is requesting that Iarnród Éireann improve the eastbound service from the station by allowing a morning Galway to Dublin train to serve the station.

=== Current Services ===
==== Train Services ====
All intercity trains from Galway to Dublin call at woodlawn a bihourly scheadle and hourly in peak times.

Preceding station	Iarnród Éireann	Following station
Ballinasloe	InterCity; Dublin–Westport/Galway railway line	Attymon

==== Bus Services ====
There is currently no scheduled bus service serving the station.

== See also ==
- List of railway stations in Ireland
