= Milltownpass Bog =

Peat bog in County Westmeath, Ireland

Coordinates: 53.453°N 7.223°W

Milltownpass Bog is a peat bog in County Westmeath, Ireland. The bog is near the village of Milltownpass on the R446 regional road.

As a raised bog of ecological interest, it has been declared a Natural Heritage Area.

== See also ==
- Milltownpass
- Bog of Allen
- Cloncrow Bog
