= Kilbride, County Westmeath (civil parish) =

Civil parish in County Westmeath, Ireland

Kilbride Cill Bhríde
- Civil parish
- Location of Kilbride in County Westmeath, Ireland
- Coordinates: 53°26′32″N 7°19′40″W
- Country: Ireland
- Province: Leinster
- County: County Westmeath
- Irish grid reference: N 447437

Kilbride (Irish: Cill Bhríde) is a civil parish in County Westmeath, Ireland. It is located about 9 km (6 mi) south of Mullingar.

Kilbride is one of 10 civil parishes in the barony of Fartullagh in the province of Leinster. The civil parish covers 1,990.9 acres (8.057 km^{2}).

Kilbride civil parish comprises 7 townlands: Beggstown, Fearmore, Gibbonstown, Kilbride, Moorerow or Tonlegee, Simonstown, and Whitewell.

The neighbouring civil parishes are: Moylisker and Enniscoffey to the north, Pass of Kilbride to the east, Castlelost to the south and Carrick to the west.
