= Milltown River =

Physical characteristics
- Source
  - location: Milltownpass, County Westmeath
- Mouth
  - coordinates: 53.425°N 7.202°W

The Milltown River is a river in Ireland. It flows from a small swampland in Milltownpass, a small village in the south of County Westmeath.

Historically the river featured a mill which was used to power the town. The village was one of the first villages in Ireland to be powered by electricity.
