= Castlejordan, County Meath =

Village in County Meath, Ireland

Castlejordan Caisleán Shiurdáin
- Village
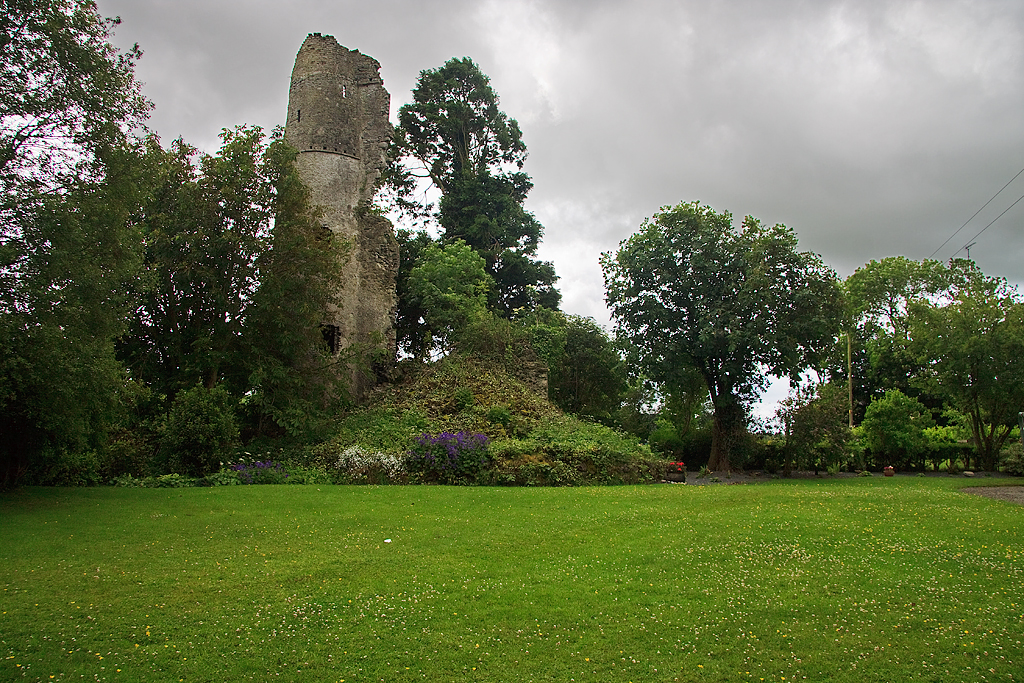
- The ruins of Castle Jordan tower house lie close to the centre of the village

- Location in Ireland
- Coordinates: 53°23′48″N 7°06′41″W
- Country: Ireland
- Province: Leinster
- County: County Meath
- Time zone: UTC+0 (WET)
  - Summer (DST): UTC-1 (IST (WEST))
- Irish Grid Reference: N576714

Castlejordan (Irish: Caisleán Shiurdáin) is a village and townland in County Meath, Ireland. It is located in the south of the county, close to the border with County Offaly, to the south of Kinnegad. The townland of Castlejordan has an area of approximately 2.2 square kilometres (0.85 sq mi), and had a population of 85 people as of the 2011 census.

== Name ==
Castlejordan is named for Jordan De Courcy, ancestor of the Norman De Courcy family. Following his uncle John De Courcys death in Downpatrick, Jordan De Courcy was exiled to Exeter. Upon his return to Ireland he built a castle in the area.

== History ==
Evidence of ancient settlement in the area include ringfort sites in the surrounding townlands of Kildangan and Harristown. There is a ruined medieval tower house in the village, which was historically associated with the Gifford family.

The Church of Ireland church in the village (built c. 1823) is now largely in ruin. The Roman Catholic church (built c. 1840) is still in use and dedicated to the Holy Trinity.

== Amenities and sport ==
Castlejordan village contains a pub, a post office, and the Roman Catholic church. The local national (primary) school, Castlejordan Central National School (also known as St Ciarán's NS), had an enrollment of 85 pupils as of 2020.

Ballinabrackey GAA is the local Gaelic Athletic Association club.

== See also ==
- List of towns and villages in Ireland
