= Monagh River =

River in Ireland

Coordinates: 52°08′N 10°17′W

The Monagh River is a river in Ireland. The river flows through three counties: Westmeath, Offaly and Meath. The river is also connected to other rivers in the area including Milltown River in Westmeath, and the Yellow River on the Meath–Offaly border. The mouth of the river is 1.12 km (0.7 miles) south of Castlejordan while the head of the river is 0.32 km (0.2 miles) east of Smithstown.
