= R400 road (Ireland) =

Road in Ireland

R400 road
- Bóthar R400
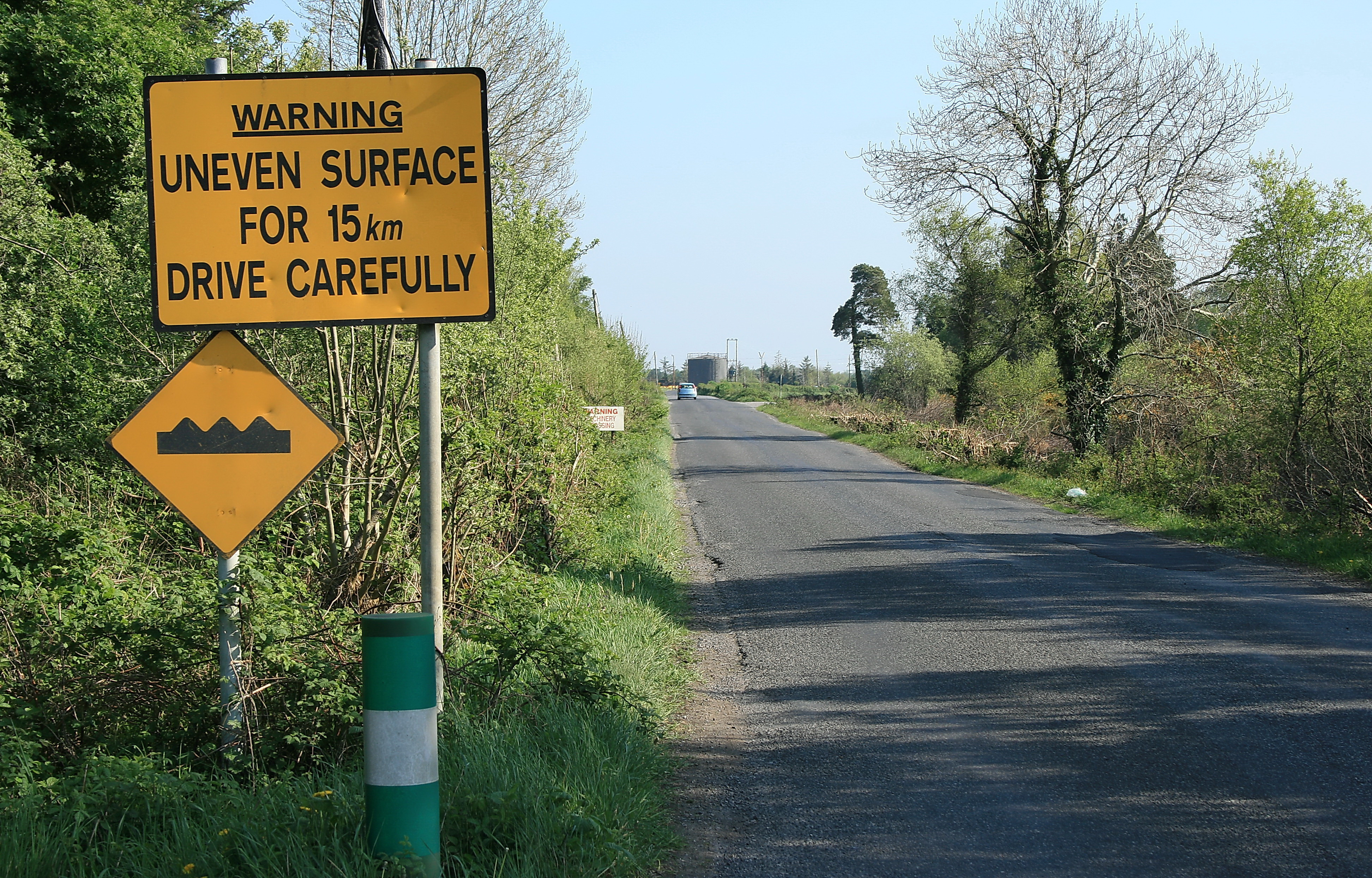
- R400 – crossing the Bog of Allen south of Rhode

Route information
- Length: 43 km (27 mi)

Location
- Country: Ireland
- Primary destinations: County Westmeath; Mullingar – leaves town centre; Rochfortbridge – join/leave R446; Cross M6 at grade separated interchange; County Offaly; Rhode – R441; Crosses the Grand Canal; R402; Walsh Island; Crosses the Cushina River; Cushina – terminates at the R419

Highway system
- Roads in Ireland; Motorways; Primary; Secondary; Regional

The R400 road is a regional road in Ireland, linking Mullingar, County Westmeath to the R419 at Cushina, County Offaly.

== Route ==
It starts in the centre of Mullingar and crosses over the N52 south of the town.

In Rochfortbridge it joins the R446, (the former N6), then leaves it southwards crossing over the M6 motorway at a grade separated junction.

Continuing south it enters County Offaly and then for 25 km it crosses the western edge of the Bog of Allen; going through the village of Rhode, crossing the Grand Canal, intersecting with the R402, skirting the village of Walsh Island before terminating in Cushina.

The route is 43 km (27 mi) long.

== Map of the route ==
R400 Routemap.

== Local name ==
From its junction with the R402 in the townland of Mount Lucas and Drumcaw until its end at Cushina, the R400 is known locally as the Pike road.

== See also ==
- Roads in Ireland
- National primary road
- National secondary road
