= Milltownpass =

Village in County Westmeath, Ireland

Milltownpass Bealach Bhaile an Mhuilinn
- Village
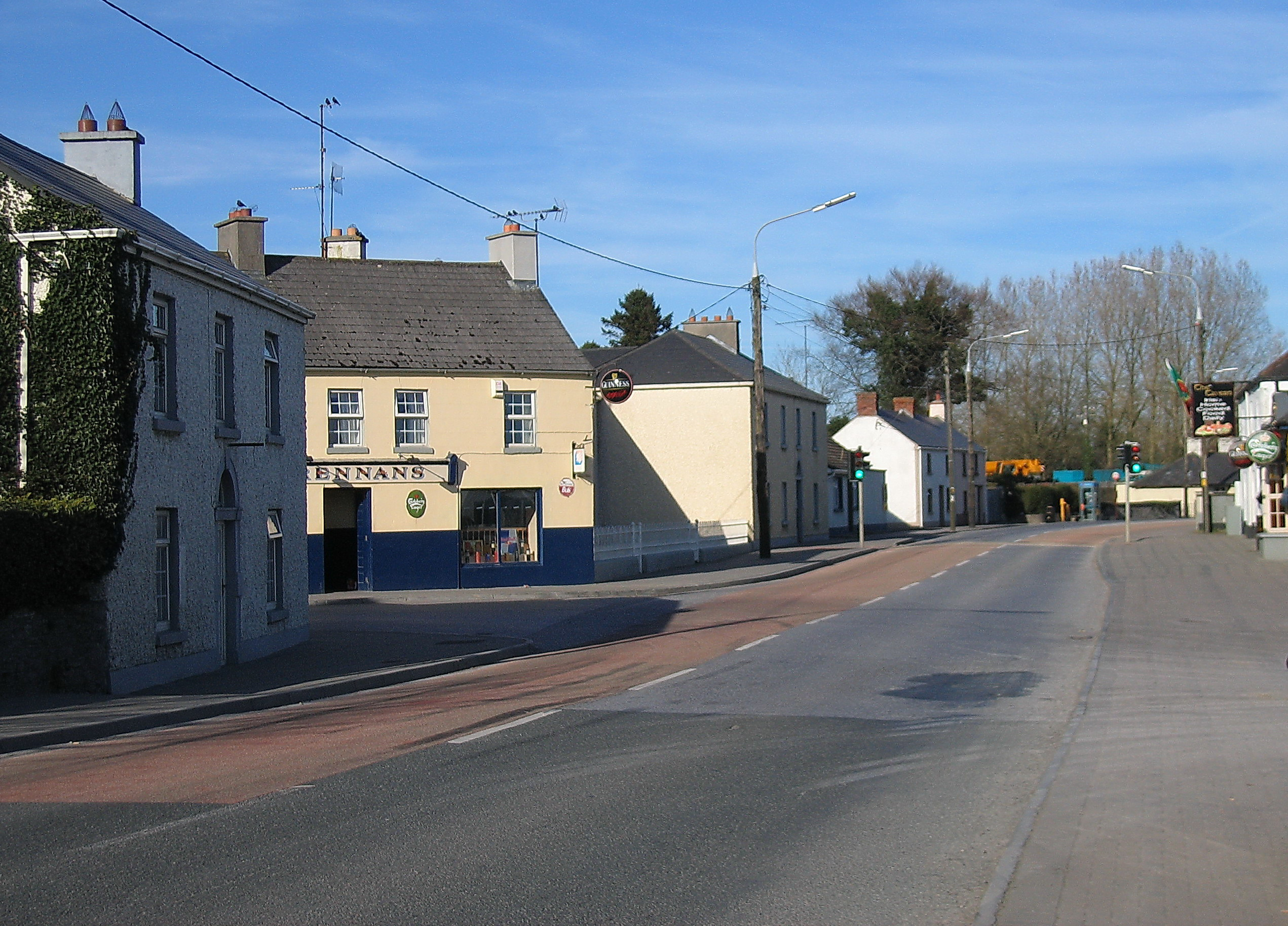
- Main Street, Milltownpass

- Location in Ireland
- Coordinates: 53°26′32″N 7°14′37″W
- Country: Ireland
- Province: Leinster
- County: County Westmeath
- Time zone: UTC+0 (WET)
  - Summer (DST): UTC-1 (IST (WEST))
- Irish Grid Reference: N503438

Milltownpass (Irish: Bealach Bhaile an Mhuilinn) is a village in County Westmeath, Ireland. It is in the south of the county, 10 km south-east of Mullingar. The village is on the R446 regional road (formerly the N6 national primary route); the old route was replaced by a dual-carriageway from Kinnegad to Tyrrellspass in 2006, bypassing the village. Milltownpass is the second largest village in the parish of Rochfortbridge. It was one of the first villages in Ireland to have its own electricity supply: a mill on the Milltown River providing power to the village long before rural electrification.

The village is close to the Milltownpass Bog. The Milltown River begins at the north side of the village and flows south to the County Offaly border where it splits into the Monagh River.

Amenities in Milltownpass include Grennan's pub, social services, a community centre, St. Joseph's National Primary School, and funeral home. Local employers include Cole Arc Engineers, Wrights Windows and Skyclad.

The local GAA team is Milltownpass GAA.

== See also ==
- List of towns and villages in Ireland
