= R446 road (Ireland) =

Road between Kinnegad and Galway in Ireland

R446 road
- Bóthar R446
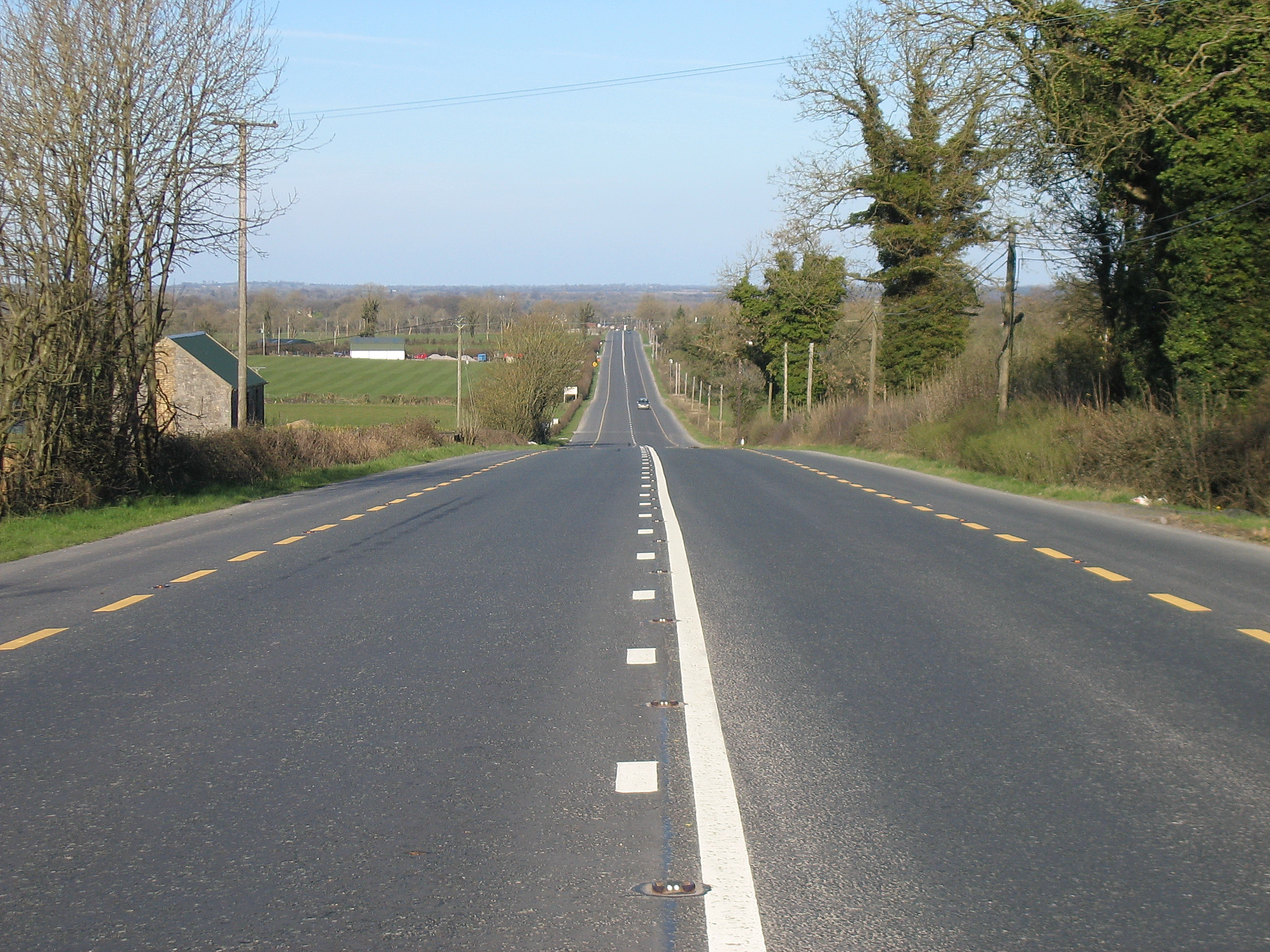
- The R446 at Gneevebawn Hill, between Tyrrellspass and Rochfortbridge

Location
- Country: Ireland

Highway system
- Roads in Ireland; Motorways; Primary; Secondary; Regional

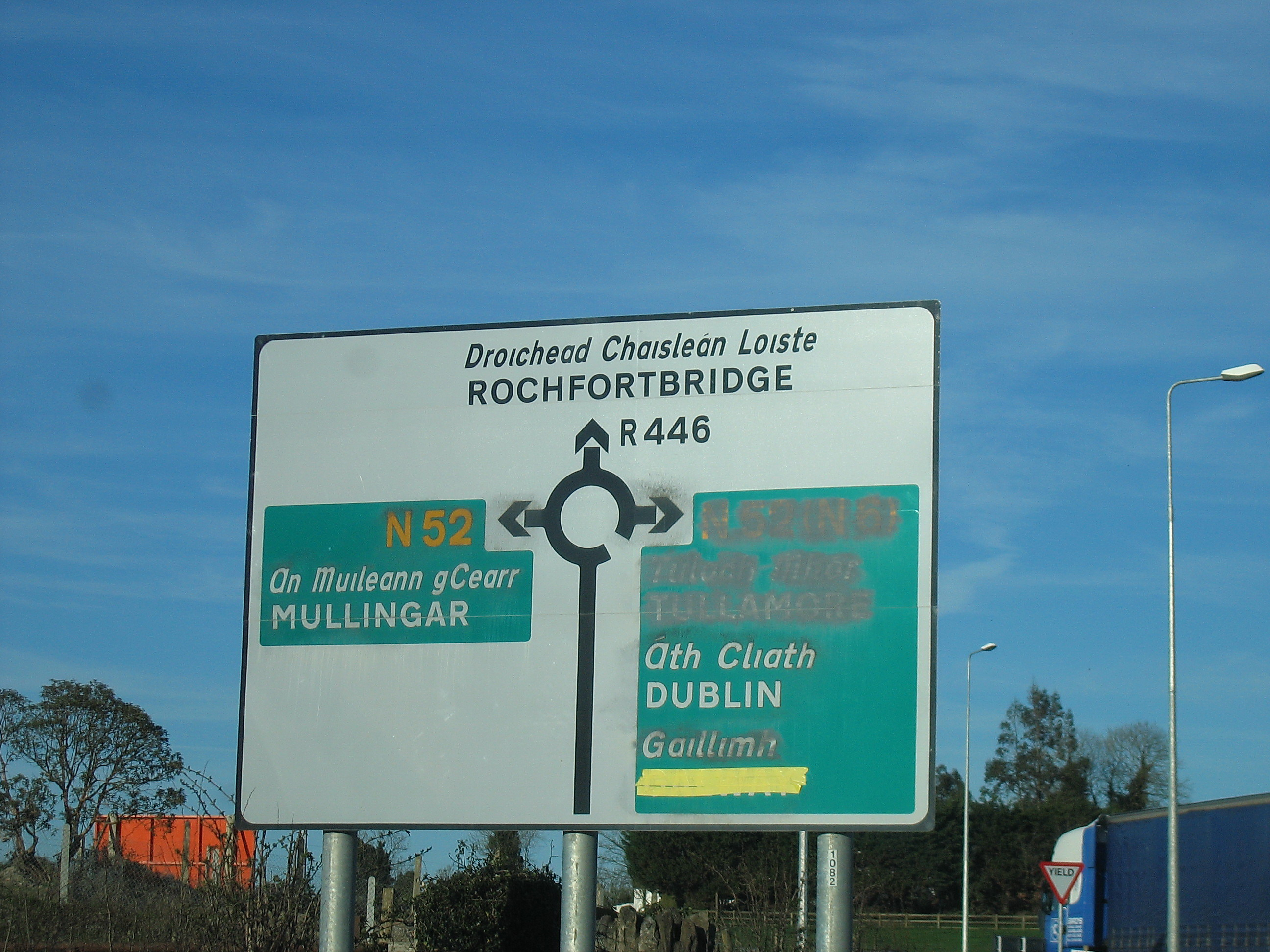
Sign at the start of the Tyrrellspass to Kinegad section of the R446 (April 2007)

The R446 road is a regional road in Ireland. The road connects Kinnegad in County Westmeath to Galway City. Prior to the construction of the M6 motorway the R446 formed the main N6 road connecting Dublin and Galway (via the N4 at Kinnegad). Following the opening of the M6; the old N6 road was downgraded to regional road status and was designated as the R446. The road is an alternative route between Galway and Dublin and runs in parallel to the M6.

From Kinnegad the road travels in a westwards direction passing through the midland counties of Westmeath & Offaly. It crosses the River Shannon at Athlone and continues into counties Roscommon and Galway. The road passes through the following towns and villages en route to Galway City from Kinnegad; Milltownpass, Rochfortbridge, Tyrrellspass, Kilbeggan, Horseleap, Moate, Athlone, Ballinasloe, Loughrea, Craughwell & Oranmore (bypassed). The road ends at the Coolagh Roundabout with the junction of the N6 east of Galway City.

== Route ==
The official description of the R446 from the Roads Act 1993 (Classification of Regional Roads) (Amendment) Order 2018 reads:

R446: Kinnegad, County Westmeath — Galway (Old National Route 6)

Between its junction with R148 at Rossan in the county of Westmeath and its junction with N62 at Fardrum in the county of Westmeath via Kinnegad, Milltownpass, Rochfortbridge, Tyrellspass, Kilbeggan and Horsleap in the county of Westmeath: Ballynahinch in the county of Offaly: Bawnoges; Dublin Road, The Turnpike, Main Street, Church Street and Athlone Road at Moate; Seeoge, and Killogeenaghan in the county of WestMeath

and

between its junction with N62 at Creggan Upper in the county of Westmeath and its junction with N65 at Kilmean in the county of Galway via Kilmacuagh in the county of Westmeath: Brideswell, Castlemaine Street, Sean Costello Street, Dublin Gate Street, Church Street, Custume Place, Custume Bridge, Grace Road, Railway Road and Galway Road in the town of Athlone: Monksland, Cornafulla, Ballydangan and Beagh in the county of Roscommon: Church Street, Bridge Street, Sli na hAbhann, Harbour Lane, Hymany Street, Dunlo Hill and Brackernagh in the town of Ballinasloe: Mackney, Melehan Bridge, Cappataggle Cross and Kilreekill in the county of Galway

and

between its junction with N66 at Caherlavine and its junction with N67 at Oranbeg via Blackgarden, Doonard, Craughwell, Crinnage and Derrydonnell Beg all in the county of Galway

and

between its junction with N67 at Carrowmoneash in the county of Galway and its junction with the N6 at Doughiska in the city of Galway via Garraun South in the county of Galway: and Bothar Na dTreabh in the city of Galway.

== See also ==
- Roads in Ireland
- National primary road
- National secondary road
