= Rochfortbridge =

Village in County Westmeath, Ireland

Rochfortbridge Irish: Droichead Chaisleán Loiste
- Village
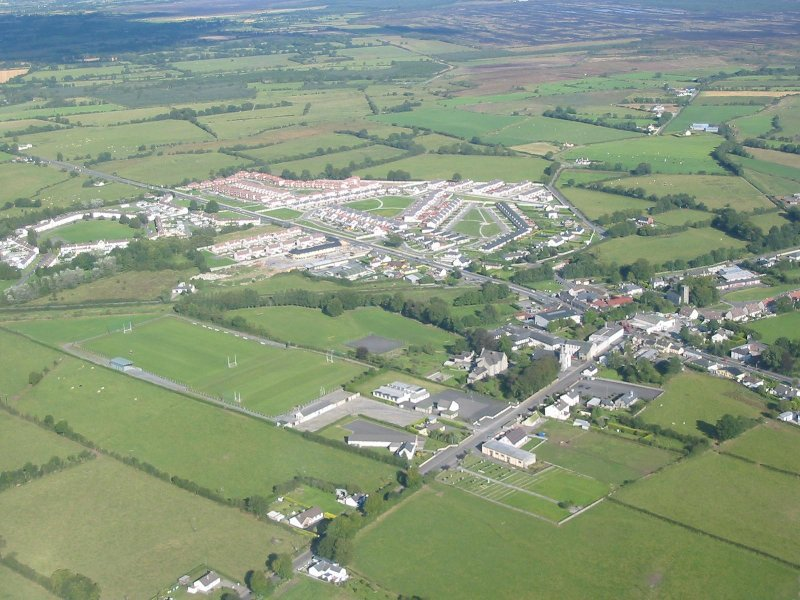
- Aerial view of Rochfortbridge

- Location in Ireland
- Coordinates: 53°24′58″N 7°17′46″W
- Country: Ireland
- Province: Leinster
- County: County Westmeath

Government
  - Dáil constituency: Longford–Westmeath
  - EP constituency: Midlands–North-West
- Elevation: 32 m (105 ft)

Population (2016)
  - Urban: 1,473
- Time zone: UTC+0 (WET)
  - Summer (DST): UTC-1 (IST (WEST))
- Area code: +353-44-92
- Irish Grid Reference: N462407

Rochfortbridge (Irish: Droichead Chaisleán Loiste, meaning 'Castle Lost Bridge') is a village in County Westmeath, Ireland. It is at the intersection of the R400 and the R446 (formerly the N6) roads, 12 km south of Mullingar. As of the 2016 census, the population of Rochfortbridge was 1,473.

== History ==
Rochfortbridge is spread between the townlands of Castlelost and Rahanine, both within Castlelost parish, which was inhabited at least as early as 590 AD by monks under Mo Chutu (later St. Carthage). The village was originally known as Beggar's Bridge, supposedly after a beggar who died at a river crossing; enough money was found in his pockets to build a bridge.

The village proper was set out c. 1700 by Robert Rochfort, MP for Westmeath from 1651 to 1727. As part of the village building programme, Rochfort financed and built a new bridge over the River Derry, giving the village its new name. Following the death of Rochfort in 1727, the village was controlled by his son George Rochfort. George died just three years later, in 1730, and the village was then under the control of his son Robert Rochfort (soon to become 1st Earl of Belvedere). On the death of the 1st Earl, the village passed to his son and heir George Augustus Rochfort, the 2nd Earl of Belvedere.

In 1797 Lt. Col. Robert Rochfort, son of the 1st Earl and brother of the 2nd Earl, died; his estate passed to the Cooper family. The other great Rochfort estate at Gaulstown passed to Lord Kilmaine. In 1847 Josias Cooper and Lord Kilmaine rebuilt the village as part of a famine relief programme. Almost all of the original village dwellings were demolished during this rebuilding effort; the only remaining Rochefort-era building is the former Church of Ireland.

=== Mercy Convent and St. Joseph's ===
In 1862 three nuns established Mercy Convent Rochfortbridge, moving into a purpose-built building in 1872 with the monetary support of a local family. At the urging of Thomas McNulty, Bishop of Meath, Mother Mary Stanislaus O'Neill established St. Joseph's Institute for the Deaf and Dumb in 1892, which provided education and vocational training for deaf and dumb girls until its closure in 1942 due to low attendance. In 1948 St. Joseph's Secondary School opened, expanding to admit boys as well as girls in 1963.

In September 2016, it was announced the Convent of Mercy was to be retired, with the final three nuns in Rochfortbridge officially retiring on 16 September 2016 following a celebration of thanksgiving.

=== Historic sites ===
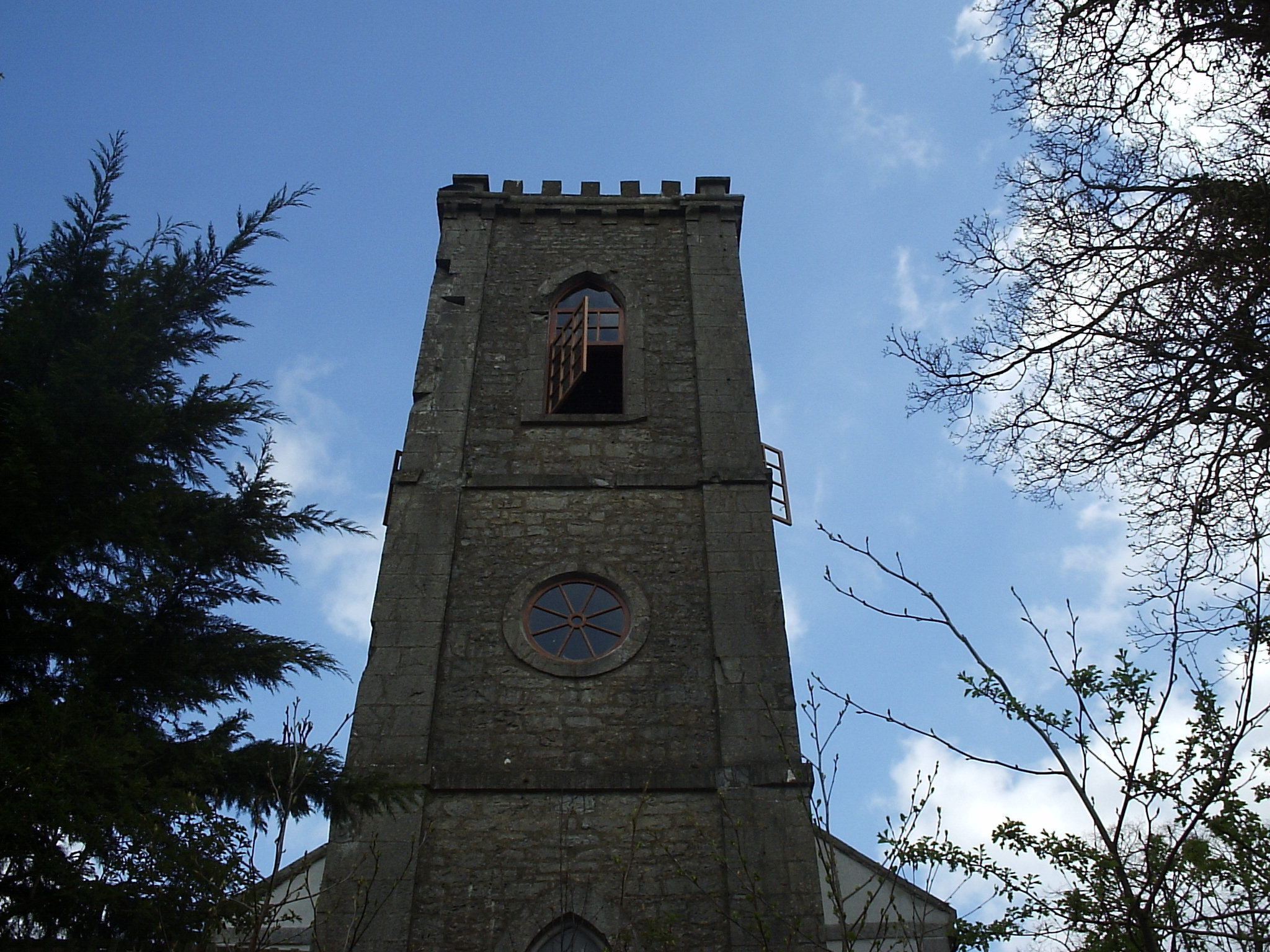
Castlelost Parish Church

Other historic sites in the village area include Castlelost Castle, a moat, and a graveyard. There is also an example of a ring fort in the middle of the village.

The Roman Catholic Church of the Immaculate Conception dates back to 1857.

The Church of Ireland church, Castlelost Parish Church, dates to 1815.

== Amenities and development ==
The village has one primary school and one secondary school; the boys' primary school (formally called schoil bhride) amalgamated with the neighbouring girls school in 2014. There are two more primary schools in the wider area.

Rochfortbridge was bypassed in 2006 by the new M6 motorway, which superseded the N6 national primary road running through the centre of the village.

== Demographics ==
As of the 2011 census there were 1,494 people in Rochfortbridge: 743 males and 751 females. Rochfortbridge has been established as a commuter location, moving away from its historically agricultural background. At the time of the census, 346 workers were employed outside of the area, out of 479 workers total, while only six were employed in agricultural, forestry, or fishing industries.

Non-Irish nationals accounted for only 6.4% of the population, with the two largest sub-groups being UK nationals (26 persons) and Nigerians (15 persons). The dominant religion was Catholicism, with 1,356 adherents; 92 people stated they were of other religions, with 38 claiming to be of no religion. Unemployment was higher in the Rochfortbridge area than nationally, at 27.1% compared to 19.0%.

== See also ==
- List of towns and villages in the Republic of Ireland
- Rochfort family
