= Rathconrath (barony) =

Barony in County Westmeath, Ireland

Rathconrath Ráth Conarta
- Barony
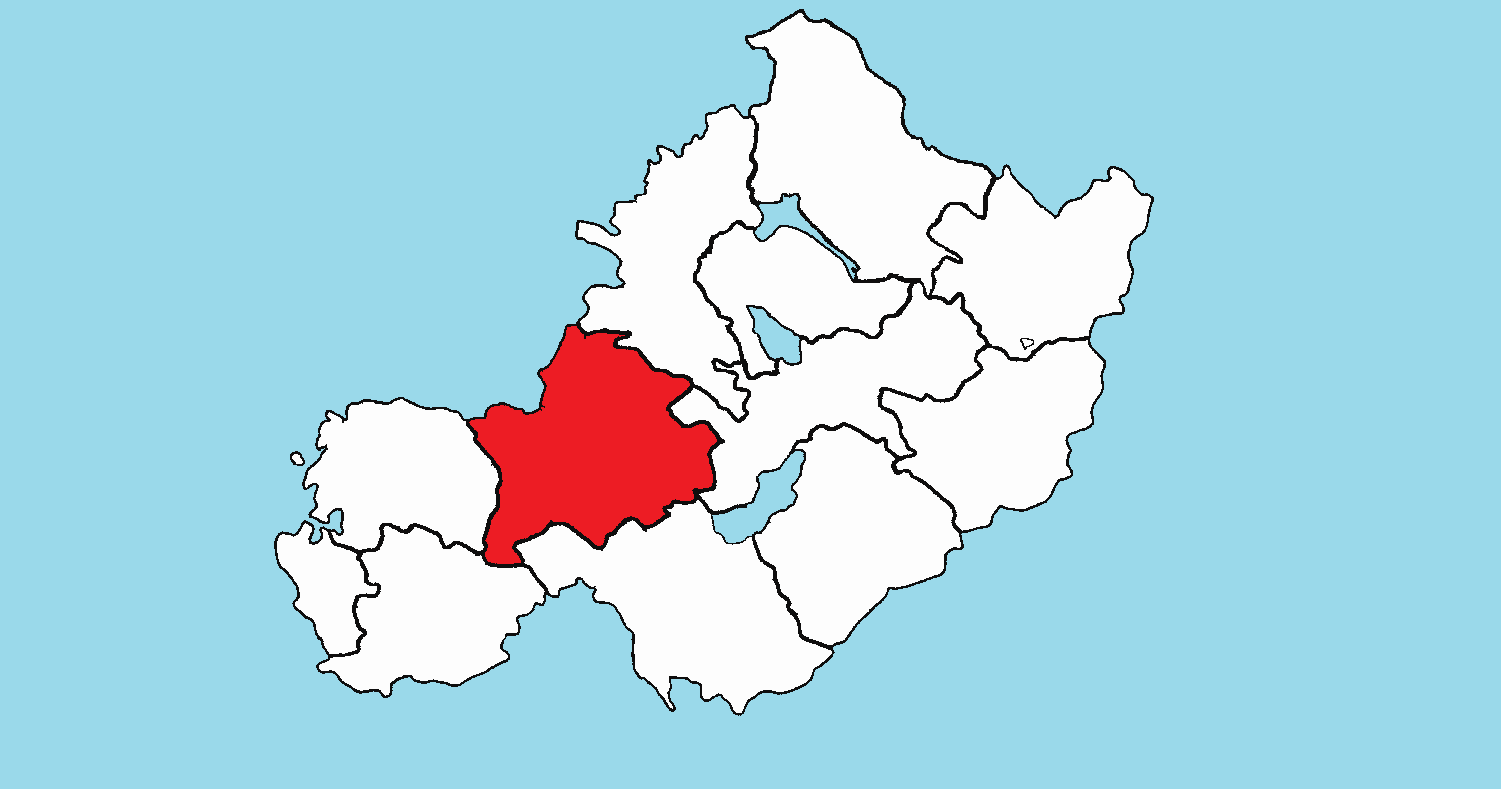
- Location of Rathconrath on a map of Westmeath

- Location in Ireland
- Coordinates: 53°30′18″N 7°36′16″W
- Country: Ireland
- Province: Leinster
- County: Westmeath

Area
  - Total: 194.5 km^{2} (75.1 sq mi)
- Time zone: UTC+0 (WET)
  - Summer (DST): UTC+1 (IST (WEST))
- Irish Grid Reference: N262506

Rathconrath (Irish: Ráth Conarta), previously the barony of Rathcomyrta, before that Daltons country, is a barony in the west of County Westmeath, in Ireland. It was formed by 1542. It is bordered by County Longford to the north–west and five other Westmeath baronies: Moygoish to the north, Moyashel and Magheradernon to the east, Moycashel and Clonlonan to the south and Kilkenny West to the west. The village of Rathconrath is not synonymous with the barony of the same name.

== Geography ==
Rathconrath has an area of 48,068 acres (194.52 km^{2}). Uisneach hill rises to 182 metres (597 ft).

== Civil parishes of the barony ==
This table lists an historical geographical sub-division of the barony known as the civil parish (not to be confused with an Ecclesiastical parish).

Name in English	Name in Irish
Ballymore	An Baile Mór
Ballymorin	Baile Mhóirín
Churchtown	Baile an Teampaill
Conry	Cónra
Dysart	An Díseart
Killare	Cill Áir
Piercetown	Baile Phiarais
Rathconrath	Ráth Conarta
Templepatrick	Teampall Phádraig

== Villages and townlands ==
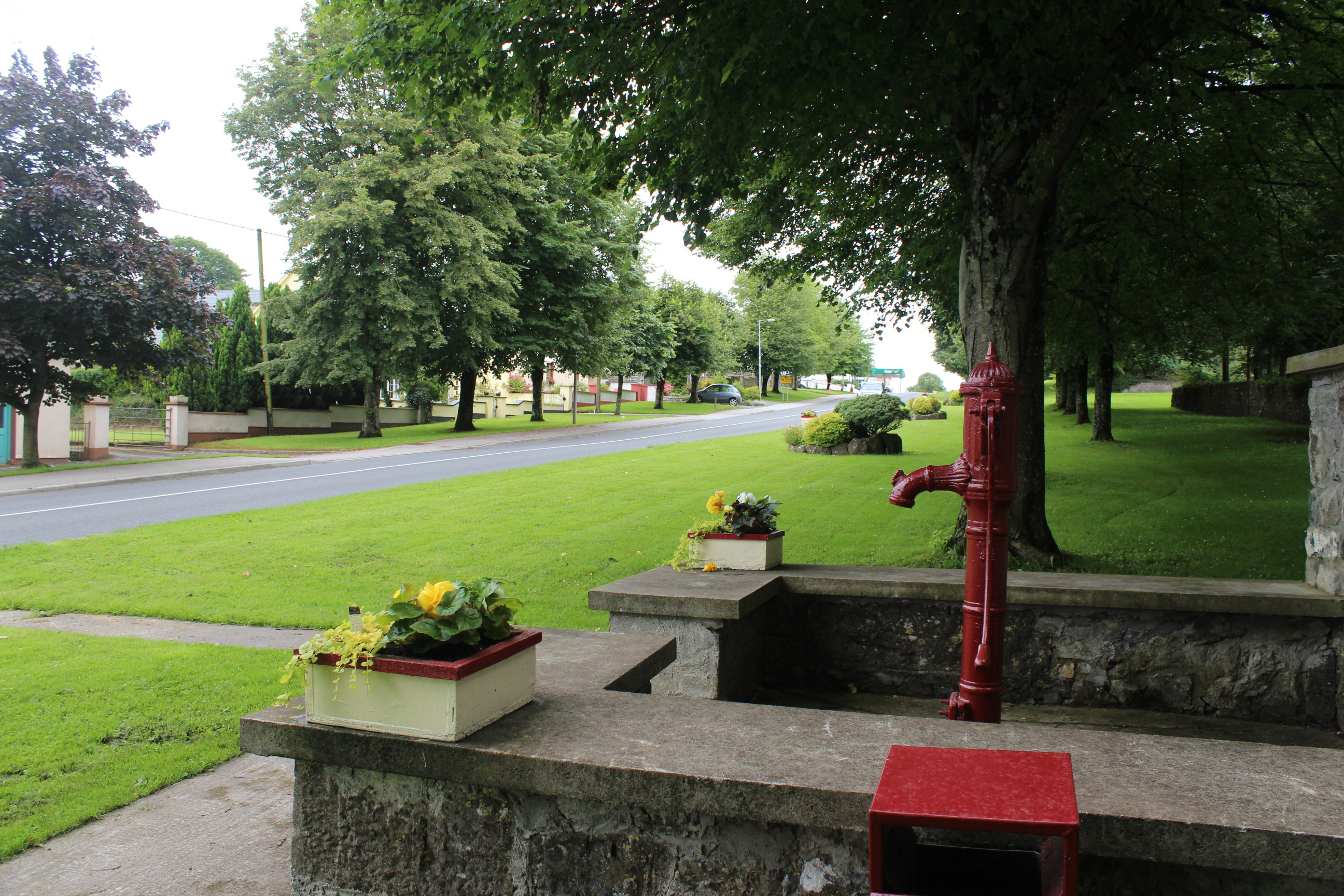
The parish pump in Ballymore, Co Westmeath

- Ballymore, a village on the R390 regional road between Athlone and Mullingar
- Dysart, a village on the R391 road
- Loughnavalley, a village at the junction of the R389 and the R390 roads
- Moyvore, a village on the R392 road
- Moyvoughly, a small village
- Rathconrath, a village on the R392 road, west of Mullingar

There are 162 townlands in the barony of Rathconrath.

== Places of interest ==
- Hill of Uisneach (Irish: Cnoc Uisnigh), an ancient ceremonial site consisting of a set of monuments and earthworks spread over two square kilometres, in folklore the centre of Ireland.
