= Moycashel =

Barony in County Westmeath, Ireland

Moycashel Maigh Chaisil
- Barony
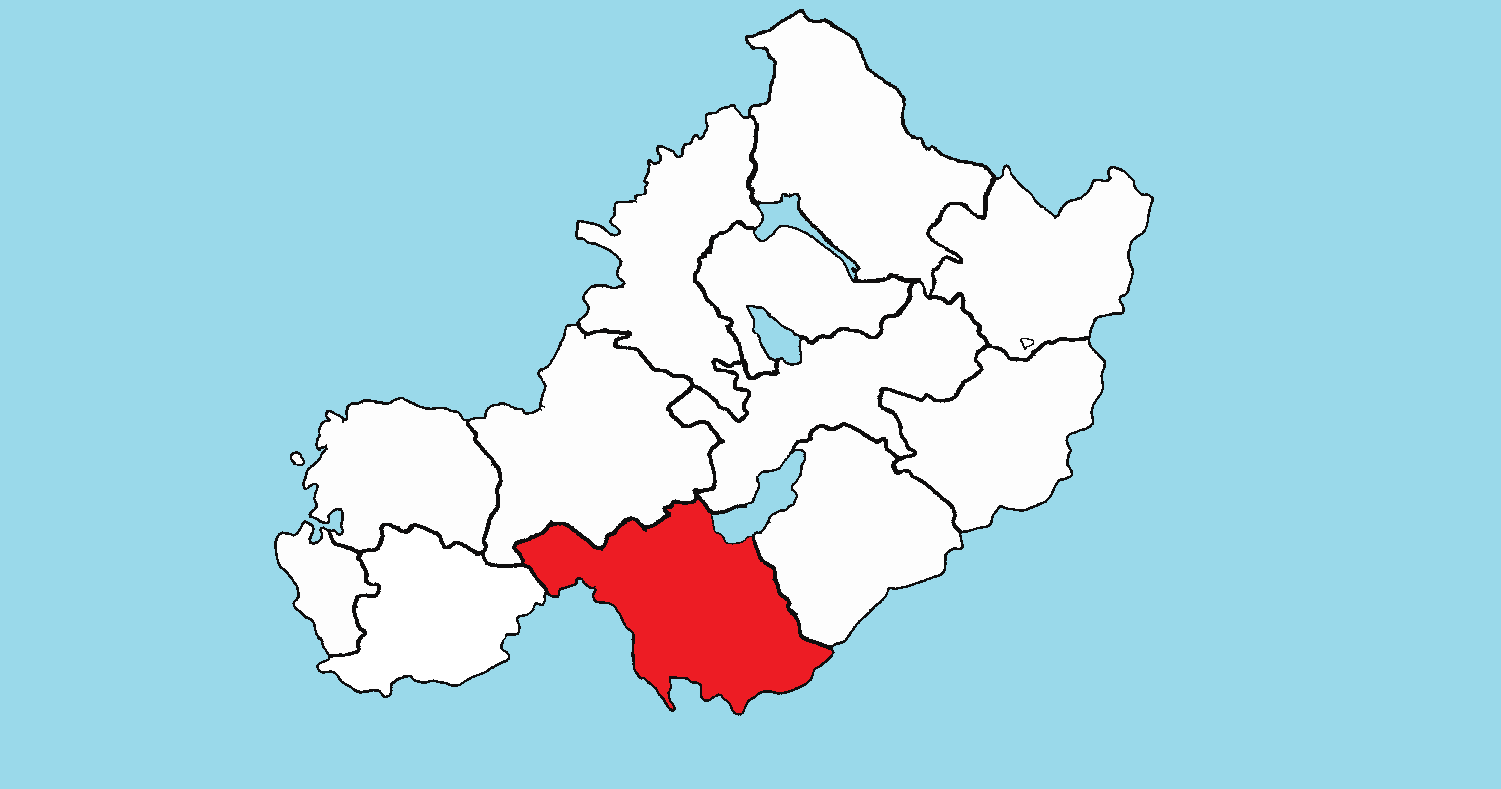
- Location of Moycashel on a map of Westmeath

- Location in Ireland
- Coordinates: 53°23′51″N 7°30′26″W
- Country: Ireland
- Province: Leinster
- County: Westmeath

Area
  - Total: 198.2 km^{2} (76.5 sq mi)
- Time zone: UTC+0 (WET)
  - Summer (DST): UTC+1 (IST (WEST))
- Irish Grid Reference: N328386

Moycashel (Irish: Maigh Chaisil), previously the barony of Rossaughe, and before that, Delamares country, is a barony in south County Westmeath, in Ireland. It was formed by 1542. It is bordered by three other baronies: Clonlonan to the west, Rathconrath to the north, Moyashel and Magheradernon to the north-east and Fartullagh to the west. The largest population centre is Kilbeggan.

== Geography ==
Moycashel has an area of 48,965.4 acres (198.156 km^{2}). The barony contains a part of the south–west end of Lough Ennell and the River Brosna flows through Kilbeggan before it connects to the River Shannon.

The M6 motorway passes through the barony to the south of Kilbeggan and (together with the M4) links Dublin with Galway.

The N52, a national secondary road passes through Kilbeggan linking the M7 motorway from just south of Nenagh, County Tipperary to the M1 motorway north of Dundalk in County Louth.

The R446 regional road (the old N6) runs through Kilbeggan and roughly parallel to the M6, also connecting Dublin with Galway.

In addition the R389 (linking Kilbeggan to the R392 near Moyvore) and the R391 (linking Clara, County Offaly to Mullingar, County Westmeath) pass through the barony.

== Civil parishes of the barony ==
This table lists an historical geographical sub-division of the barony known as the civil parish (not to be confused with an Ecclesiastical parish).

Name in English	Name in Irish
Ardnurcher or Horseleap	Baile Átha an Urchair
Castletownkindalen	Baile an Chaisleáin
Durrow	Darú
Dysart	An Díseart
Kilbeggan	Cill Bheagáin
Kilcumreragh	Cill Chruimthir Fhiachrach
Newtown	An Baile Nua
Rahugh	Ráth Aodha

== Towns, villages and townlands ==
- Ballynagore
- Castletown Geoghegan
- Dysart
- Kilbeggan
- Rosemount
- Streamstown

There are 171 townlands in the barony of Moycashel.

== Buildings and other places of note ==
- Kilbeggan Distillery
- Kilbeggan Racecourse
- Market House, Kilbeggan
- Middleton Park House, Castletown Geoghegan
- Mount Druid, Castletown Geoghegan
- St. Micheal's Church, Castletown Geoghegan
