= Dysart (civil parish) =

Civil parish in County Westmeath, Ireland

Dysart An Díseart
- Civil parish
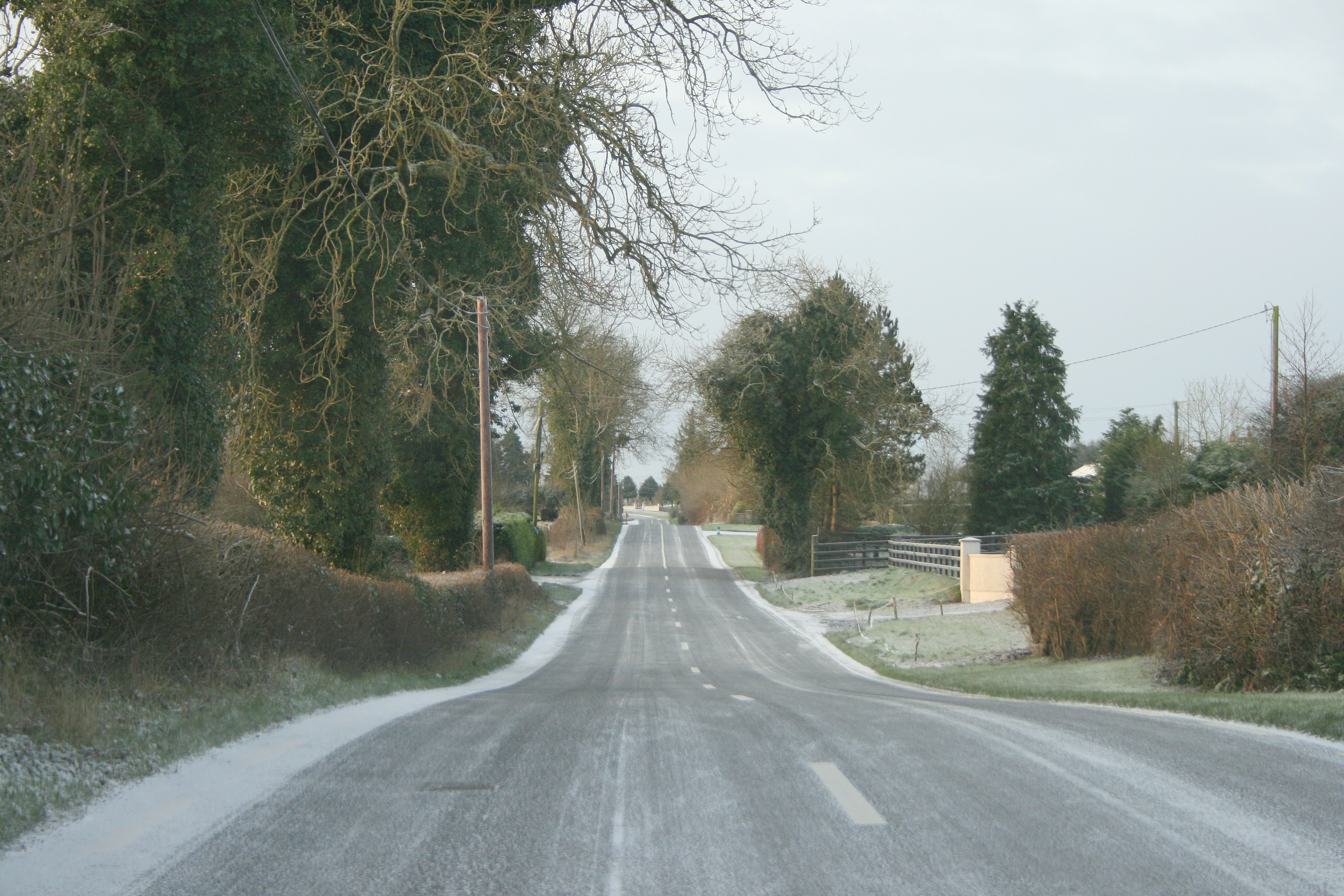
- The R391 road in Dysart

- Location of Dysart in County Westmeath, Ireland
- Coordinates: 53°28′39″N 7°26′45″W
- Country: Ireland
- Province: Leinster
- County: County Westmeath
- Irish grid reference: N369476

Dysart (Irish: An Díseart, meaning 'hermitage') is a civil parish in County Westmeath, Ireland. It is located about 8.5 km (5 mi) south‑west of Mullingar.

Dysart is one of 3 civil parishes in the barony of Moyashel and Magheradernon in the province of Leinster. The civil parish covers 7,424.7 acres (30.047 km^{2}). Parts of the parish (Ballyhandy and Barrettstown) are in the neighbouring barony of Rathconrath, others (Lilliput Nure and Monaghanstown) are in the barony of Moycashel.

Dysart civil parish comprises 11 townlands: Ballyhandy, Barrettstown, Bryanstown, Dysart, Lilliput Nure, Monaghanstown, Rathnamuddagh, Slane Beg and Yorkfield. The major part of Dysart is separated from two isolated townlands south of Lough Owel, Ballyote and Slane More.

The neighbouring civil parishes are: Mullingar to the north, Lynn (barony of Fartullagh) to the north‑east, Moylisker and Carrick (both Fartullagh) to the east, Clonfad (Fartullagh) to the south‑east, Castletownkindalen (barony of Moycashel) to the south and south‑west and Churchtown (barony of Rathconrath) to the west and north‑west. This excludes neighbours of Ballyote and Slane More.
