= Rathconrath (civil parish) =

Civil parish in County Westmeath, Ireland

Rathconrath Ráth Conarta
- Civil parish
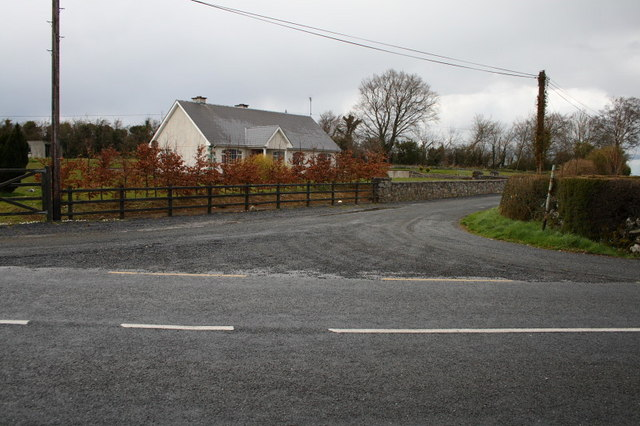
- Cleggarnagh road junction on the R392

- Location of Rathconrath within County Westmeath, Ireland
- Coordinates: 53°32′38″N 7°33′10″W
- Country: Ireland
- Province: Leinster
- County: County Westmeath
- Irish grid reference: N296549

Rathconrath (Irish: Ráth Conarta) is a civil parish in County Westmeath, Ireland. It is located about 14 km (9 mi) west of Mullingar on the R392 road and the Royal Canal.

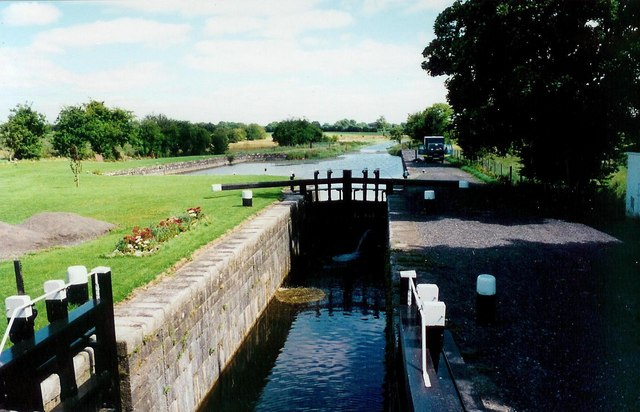
Coolnahay Lock in the Royal Canal in the north of Rathconrath

Rathconrath is one of 9 civil parishes in the barony of Rathconrath in the Province of Leinster. The civil parish covers 8,713.3 acres (35.261 km^{2}).

Rathconrath civil parish comprises the village of Rathconrath and 34 townlands.

The neighbouring civil parishes include: Kilmacnevan to the north and east, Templeoran to the east, Churchtown and Mullingar to the south–east, Ballymorin and Conry to the south–west and Piercetown to the north–west.
