= Ardnurcher =

Ardnurcher may refer to:

- Horseleap, sometimes spelled as Ardnurcher, a village on the border of County Offaly and County Westmeath, Ireland
- Ardnurcher, County Offaly (civil parish), a civil parish in County Offaly, Ireland
- Ardnurcher, County Westmeath (civil parish), a civil parish in County Westmeath, Ireland
