= Conry (civil parish) =

Civil parish in County Westmeath, Ireland

Conry Cónra
- Civil parish
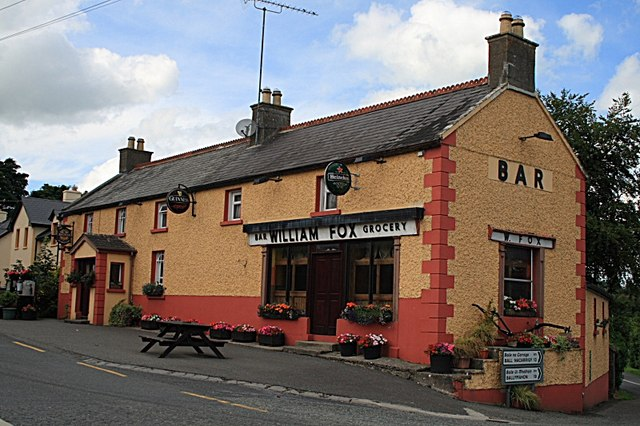
- Pub and shop in Loughnavalley

- Location of Conry in County Westmeath, Ireland
- Coordinates: 53°28′43″N 7°33′5″W
- Country: Ireland
- Province: Leinster
- County: County Westmeath
- Irish grid reference: N298476

Conry (Irish: Cónra) is a civil parish in County Westmeath, Ireland. It is located about 15 km (9 mi) west–south–west of Mullingar.

Conry is one of 9 civil parishes in the barony of Rathconrath in the province of Leinster. The civil parish covers 3,683.7 acres (14.907 km^{2}).

Conry civil parish comprises the Hill of Uisneach, the village of Loughnavalley and 13 townlands: Adamstown, Aghabrack, Carn, Clonownmore, Clonyrina, Gneevestown, Jamestown, Kellybrook, Lalistown, Lockardstown, Mweelra, Rathnew, Togherstown and Ushnagh Hill.

The neighbouring civil parishes are: Ballymorin and Rathconrath to the north, Churchtown to the east, Ardnurcher, or Horseleap and Castletownkindalen to the south and Killare to the west.
