= Newtown, County Westmeath (civil parish) =

Civil parish in County Westmeath, Ireland

Newtown An Baile Nua
- Civil parish
- Location of Newtown within County Westmeath in Ireland
- Coordinates: 53°23′4″N 7°23′52″W
- Country: Ireland
- Province: Leinster
- County: County Westmeath
- Irish grid reference: N401372

Newtown (Irish: An Baile Nua) is a civil parish in County Westmeath, Ireland. It is located about 16 km (10 mi) south of Mullingar.

Newtown is one of eight civil parishes in the barony of Moycashel in the province of Leinster. The civil parish covers 10,248.8 acres (41.475 km^{2}).

Newtown civil parish comprises three population centres – Ballynagore; Killavally; and Tyrrellspass (barony of Fartullagh) – and 24 townlands: Aghanamanagh aka Commeenlonagh; Aghyrassy; Ardmorney; Ballykilmore; Ballymachugh; Cloncrow; Cloncullen; Clonyhague; Cornaher; Cumminstown, Cumminstown; Garryduff, Garryduff; Higginstown, Higginstown; Kilcloghan; Killavally; Knockmore; Knockycosker; Loughanlewnaght; Newtownlow; Rahinashene and Spittaltown; Rahinashurock; Rahincuill; Rahinmore; Rathgarrett; and Torque. The townlands of Ballykilmore, Rahincuill and Rathgarrett are in the barony of Fartullagh.

The neighbouring civil parishes are: Castlelost and Clonfad (both in the barony of Fartullagh) to the north, Croghan (County Offaly) to the east, Rahugh (barony of Moycashel) to the south, Kilbeggan (Moycashel) to the west and Castletownkindalen to the west and north.
