= Kilmacnevan (civil parish) =

Civil parish in County Westmeath, Ireland

Kilmacnevan Cill Mhic Naomháin
- Civil parish
- Location of Kilmacnevan within County Westmeath in Ireland
- Coordinates: 53°35′8″N 7°33′39″W
- Country: Ireland
- Province: Leinster
- County: County Westmeath
- Irish grid reference: N291595

Kilmacnevan (Irish: Cill Mhic Naomháin) is a civil parish in County Westmeath, Ireland. It is located about 16 km (10 mi) west–north–west of Mullingar.

Kilmacnevan is one of 6 civil parishes in the barony of Moygoish in the province of Leinster. The civil parish covers 5,010.3 acres (20.276 km^{2}).

Kilmacnevan civil parish comprises 11 townlands: Ballintue, Ballynacarrow, Calliaghstown, Churchtown, Conlanstown, Deerpark, Emper, Kilmacnevan, Lakingstown, Laragh and Rathmore.

The neighbouring civil parishes are: Rathaspick to the north, Kilbixy to the east, Piercetown (barony of Rathconrath) and Rathconrath (barony of Rathconrath) to the south and Agharra (barony of Shrule, County Longford) and Rathreagh (barony of Ardagh, County Longford) to the west.
