= R391 road =

R391 road may refer to:

- R391 road (Ireland)
- R391 road (South Africa)
