= Clare, County Westmeath =

Townland in Killare, Ireland

Clare (from Irish Clárach, meaning 'a level place') is a townland in Killare, Rathconrath, County Westmeath, Ireland.

== Geography ==
Clare is bounded on the north by Clonickilroe and Clonnamanagh townlands, on the west by Ballinlig Lower and Clonybane townlands, on the south by Ballinaspick townland and on the east by Dungaghy, Rackavra, Rathskeagh Upper and Taghnafearagh townlands. Its chief geographical features are Clare Hill which reaches a height of 433 feet, small streams, forestry plantations and dug wells. Clare is traversed by the local L1240 road, minor public roads and rural lanes. The townland covers 854 acres.

== History ==
The earliest surviving mention of Clare is in the Táin Bó Cúailnge set in the first century A.D. which states (lines 4227-4230)- Is and sain ra gabsatar cethri ollchóiceda Hérend dúnad & longphort ac Cláthra in n-aidchi sin. Ra fácsatar fiallach foraire & freccométa úathu ra hagid Ulad ná tístais Ulaid gan robud gan rathugud dá saigid, ('Then the four great provinces of Ireland made their encampment at Clártha that night. They left a band to keep watch and guard against the Ulstermen lest they should come upon them unawares'). (Line 4150) states- Is hí inn adaig cétna rabert Dubthach Dáel Ulad na briathra sa oc feraib Hérend i Slemain Mide in n-aidchi sin: Móra maitne maitne Mide. Móra ossud ossud Cullend. Móra cundscliu cundscliu Chláthra. Móra echrad echrad Assail. Móra tedmand tedmand Tuath Bressi. Móra in chlóe clóe Ulad im Chonchobor. Cossénait a mná. Raseisset a n-éiti for Gárig & Ilgárig isin matin se monairther, ('On that same night, Dubthach Doel ('the Scorpion') of Ulster uttered these words in his sleep among the men of Erin at Slemain Mide that night: "Great be the morn, The morn of Meath! Great be the truce The truce of Culenn! Great be the fight, The fight of Clartha! Great, too, the steeds, The steeds of Assal!" ').

A legendary explanation for the townland name is give in the tale Bruiden Da Choca (The destruction of Da Coca's hostel) which also occurred about the same time as the Táin Bó Cúailnge. It states Clare Hill was named after the hero Clartha Cloen- Do-rochair Clartha Claon la Cet mac Magach i Clathra conid uaid ainmnighther, ('Clartha Cloen was slain by Cet Mac Maga in Clartha, and that hill is named after him').

Urard Mac Coise the Chief Ollam of Ireland lived in Clare townland and died 990 A.D. He refers to Clare in his poem Airec Menman ('The Stratagem of Urard (Irard) mac Coisse'), about a cattle raid on his farm c. 956 A.D., as follows- Irard mac Coisi arrainic ind urec menmansa do ceneol iarna indred co hindligthech i cinaidh Muiredaigh mic Eogain do guin do co nairnecht indliged friss co rucsat a bú a seotu 7 gur airgset a dún feissin .i. Clarthá, (The homestead of the poet Urard mac Coisse in Clartha is raided by the family of ard-rí Domnall úa Néill).

Maol Milscothach d'eis a bó

itir Chlartha ocus Chló.

Massa neach uaibh rug a bhú.

Nicon marfot a ócu.

A óca batar.

('Maol Milscothach lost his cattle,

between Clártha and Cló.

If it was one of you who took them away,

his warriors will not survive

"O you warriors" ')

The Annals of the Four Masters for 1544 A.D. states- Rory O'Melaghlin was slain at Clartha, by Richard Dalton and his kinsmen, in a nocturnal assault; and it was for the interests of Kedagh O'Melaghlin they committed this slaughter, (Rudhraighe Ó Maoíleachlainn do mharbhadh h-i c-Clartha lá Risderd Dalatún, & lá a bhraithribh ar amus oidhche, & as ar mhaith do Chédach Ua Maoíleachlainn do-rónsat an marbhadh íshin).

On 8 December 1600 Queen Elizabeth I of England granted pardons to the following residents of Clare townland for fighting against the Queen's forces- Robert Tuite, Gillemorey O'Greadie, Teig O'Connor, Redmund Magroice, Tibbott Dalton, Phillme Dalton, Shane mac Morish Dalton, Patrick Duffe O'Machaghane, Brian boye O'Dirrevane and Simon Tuite and on 13 November 1602 she also pardoned the following Clare residents for the same offence- Donill O'Carbry, Moyllmory O'Cluane, Edmund Tuite, James Tuite and William McShane buye.

The owner of the townland from 1625 to 1650 was the Protestant bishop of Meath, Anthony Martin (bishop), and the townland remained in the ownership of the Bishops of Meath until the 20th century.

The Down Survey 1656 map of Killare parish depicts the townland as Clare and shows Clare Castle.

The 1659 Pender's Census of Ireland gives a population of 40 adults over the age of 15 in Clare townland, all of whom were Irish, (in general the percentage of the Irish population aged under 15 runs at about 20% so the total population in 1659 would have been about 48).

The Clare Valuation Office books are available for 1840-1841.

Griffith's Valuation of 1857 lists ten landholders in the townland.

A local folktale about the imprint of a giant's foot is found in the 1937 Dúchas collection.

== Census ==
Year	Population	Males	Females	Total Houses	Uninhabited
1841	88	44	44	15	1
1851	50	26	24	9	0
1861	53	28	25	8	0
1871	45	20	25	8	0
1881	44	20	24	8	0
1891	30	15	15	8	1

In the Census of Ireland, 1901, there were seven families listed in the townland.

In the 1911 census of Ireland, there were eight families listed in the townland.

== Antiquities ==
- Clare Castle (Caisleán Chlártha) founded by the Dalton family.(National Monuments reference number RMP WM024–078). The Annals of Westmeath, ancient and modern, by James Woods, (1907, page 206) states- "A mile south of Ballymore lies the ruins of the old castle of Clare, on a farm belonging to Mr. Charles Kelly, J. P., Lunestown. I searched all the old records in my possession, but failed to discover its past history. I inquired of an old woman if she knew anything about it, and she told me confidently that a remarkable traveller lived there once, celebrated in street ballad lore, and she showed me a bush where a ghost had taken up its residence to scare night walkers". The Heritage Council of Ireland website describes it as- "Clare Castle, also known as Mullaghcloe, situated on NE edge of a steep sided hillock, in pasture, with extensive views in all directions. Poorly preserved castle ruins standing on NE angle of bawn (approx. dims. 27m N-S x 33m E-W) which is defined by the grass-covered remains of a collapsed wall. The bawn is divided internally by a slight bank with the footings of a stone wall running E-W in the N quadrant." Castle described in 2004 as a "tower measuring 12.4m by 8m over walls 1.8m thick partly projects out from the east side of a hill-top bawn 40m by 50m marked by a stoney bank" (Salter 2004, 147). See attached plan and profile of monument surveyed and drawn by the ASI.
- Six medieval earthen ringforts, one of which is probably the residence of the aforementioned Urard Mac Coise. Descriptions of each are on The Heritage Council of Ireland website.
- Vernacular House built c. 1860. www.buildingsofireland.ie describes it as- Detached three-bay two-storey house, built c.1860, with three gable fronted dormer windows with pitched natural slate roofs and a single-bay gable-fronted entrance porch to the main elevation (northwest). Single-storey outbuilding attached to the southwest side. Now derelict and out of use. Pitched natural slate roof with cast-iron rainwater goods and a single rendered chimneystack. Rendered walls over smooth rendered plinth. Square-headed window openings with cut stone sills and remains of one-over-one pane timber sliding sash windows. Square-headed opening to the northeast face of porch with timber sheeted door. Gable fronted projecting entrance porch has remains of timber door. Fronts onto yard to the northwest having three rubble stone outbuildings with natural slate or corrugated roofs. Structure to northeast side of yard comprises five-bay single-storey building with yellow brick dressing to square-headed and segmental-headed openings. Structure to northwest side of yard with rendered chimneystack may be original dwelling house, c.1800. Single-bay single-storey structure to northeast side of yard has cut stone voussoirs to head of openings. Located to the southeast of Ballymore. Appraisal- An interesting vernacular house and farmyard, representing a good example of its type, which retains much of its early form and character. These buildings are well-built using local materials and the retention of much of the original fabric enhances the quality of the site and makes it an important element of the vernacular heritage of County Westmeath. The form the two-storey house suggests that it was originally a single-storey structure. The single-storey building forming the northwest side of yard, having a rendered chimneystack, may have been the original dwelling house on site. The wrought-iron gate and rubble limestone boundary walls complete the setting of this composition.
- Stone bridge on the border with Ballinlig Lower townland, built 1787. www.buildingsofireland.ie describes it as- Single-arch road bridge over small river/stream, dated 1787. Constructed using rubble limestone with dressed limestone voussoirs to arches. Rubble limestone coping over parapets. Date stone to parapet engraved '1787'. Located to the southeast of Ballymore. Appraisal. A well-built small-scale bridge, which retains its early form and fabric. It is well-built using local rubble limestone, attesting to the skillful craftsmanship available at the time of its construction. This bridge is very typical of the many small-scale bridges that were built by the Grand Juries to improve the transport system in Ireland, particularly during the late eighteenth and early-nineteenth centuries, a period of relative economic prosperity. According to local sources, a stone missing to the arch was removed by the I.R.A, c.1920, who planted a bomb in its place and attempted to blow up a Black and Tan unit that was to travel over the bridge by foot. However, the Black and Tan patrol never turned up.
