= Friarstown =

Coordinates: 53°26′20″N 7°24′53″W

- Townland
- Interactive map of Friarstown
- Country: Ireland

Friarstown is a townland in County Westmeath, Ireland. The townland is located in the civil parish of Clonfad. The southern shores of Lough Ennell borders the townland to the north, and Dalystown is to the east. The River Brosna forms its western border with the townland of Clonsingle.
