= Ballinagore =

Village in County Westmeath, Ireland

Ballinagore Béal Átha na nGabhar Ballynagore
- Village
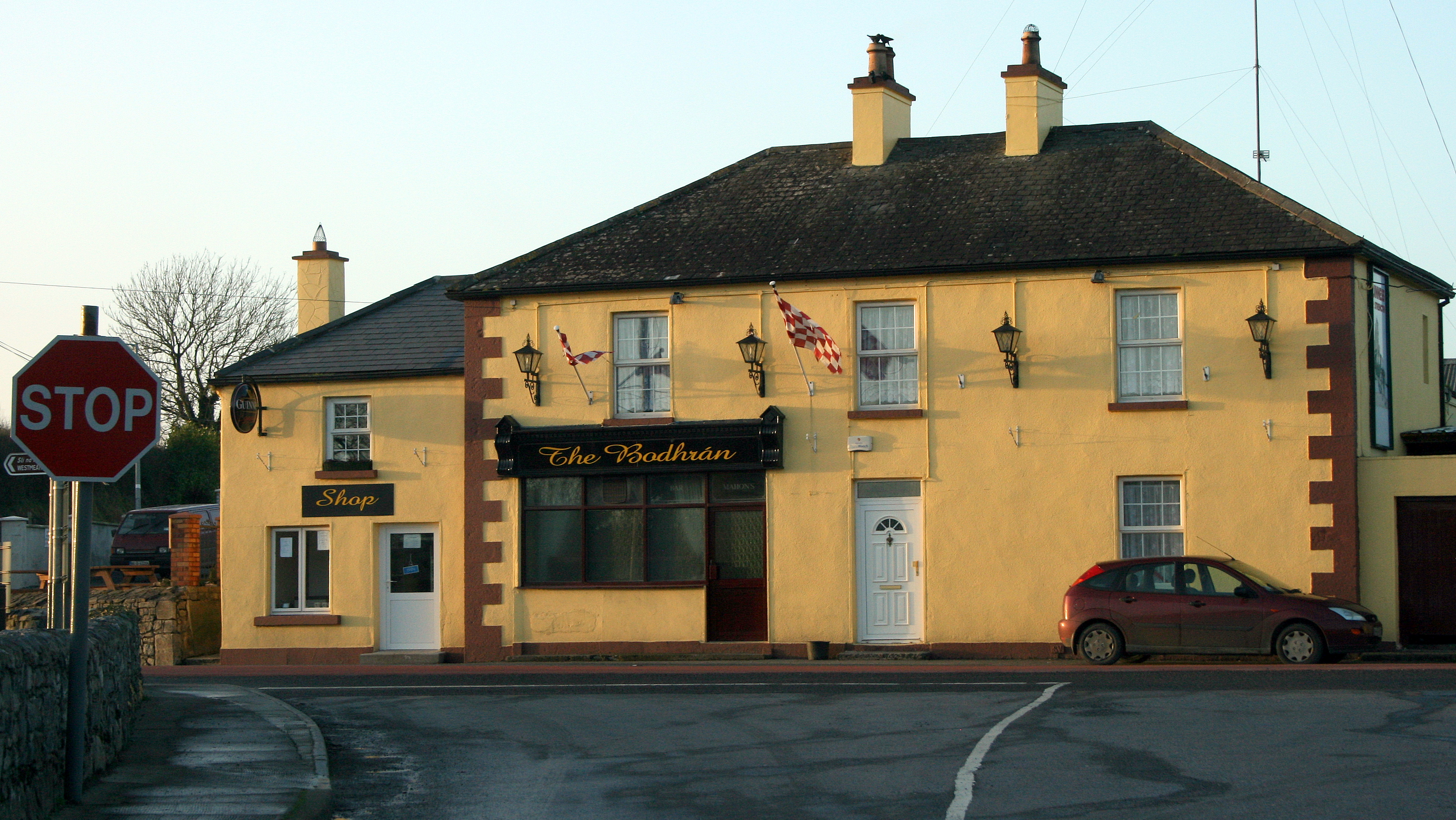
- Pub in Ballinagore

- Location in Ireland
- Coordinates: 53°24′25″N 7°27′47″W
- Country: Ireland
- Province: Leinster
- County: County Westmeath
- Barony: Moycashel
- Civil parish: Castletownkindalen
- Time zone: UTC+0 (GMT)
  - Summer (DST): UTC+1 (IST)

Ballinagore or Ballynagore (Béal Átha na nGabhar, meaning 'ford mouth of the goats') is a small village and townland in County Westmeath, Ireland. It is located in the barony of Moycashel along the River Brosna, approximately 4 kilometres (2.5 mi) north of Kilbeggan and 14 kilometres (8.7 mi) south of Mullingar, along the L1122 local road.

== History ==
The village developed around a crossing point on the River Brosna, spanned by a four-arch stone bridge. During the 19th century, Ballinagore was home to several flour mills which were established by John and William Perry (of John Perry & Co.). As of the 1830s, the area also had a large bleach-green and fulling-mill owned by the Mulock family. The mills produced flour and oatmeal, employing dozens of local workers until industrial activity declined in the 20th century.

== Amenities ==
Ballinagore contains a community park, a public house and a primary school (St. Patrick's National School). The school's main building was completed in 1914.

The local Gaelic Athletic Association (GAA) club, Ballinagore GAA, was established in the early 1920s. The club plays its home matches at Páirc an Bhodhráin on the outskirts of the village.

== Transport ==
The village lies on the L1122 local road linking Kilbeggan to Castletown Geoghegan and Mullingar. Local bus services and regional road networks are accessed via Kilbeggan along the M6 motorway.

== See also ==
- List of towns and villages in the Republic of Ireland
