= Churchtown, County Westmeath (civil parish) =

Civil parish in County Westmeath, Ireland

Churchtown Baile an Teampaill
- Civil parish
- Location of Churchtown in County Westmeath, Ireland
- Coordinates: 53°29′31″N 7°30′12″W
- Country: Ireland
- Province: Leinster
- County: County Westmeath
- Irish grid reference: N330491

Churchtown (Irish: Baile an Teampaill) is a civil parish in County Westmeath, Ireland. It is located about 11 km (7 mi) west–south–west of Mullingar.

Churchtown is one of 9 civil parishes in the barony of Rathconrath in the province of Leinster. The civil parish covers 5,301.6 acres (21.455 km^{2}).

Churchtown civil parish comprises 16 townlands: Ballynafearagh, Balrath, Churchtown, Clontinteen, Coyne, Crissaun, Croughal, Dundonnell, Glomerstown, Jamestown, Milltown, Nicholastown, Rathcore, Redmondstown, Rogerstown and Taghboyne.

The neighbouring civil parishes are: Mullingar to the north–east, Dysart to the east, Castletownkindalento the south, Conry to the west and Rathconrath to the north–west.
