= Eochaidh ua Floinn =

Irish poet

Eochaidh Ua Floinn was an Irish poet who held the post of Chief Ollam of Ireland. He died in AD 984. His poems are preserved in the Book of Lecan, Lebor Gabála Érenn and other manuscripts and include poems on the different invasions of Ireland. Edward O'Reilly gives a full account of these in his 'Irish Writers', XC sq.; d. anno 984.

Geoffrey Keating in his History of Ireland states- "Eochaidh Ua Floinn says in these verses: and he was the chief professor of poetry in Ireland in his time:—

Four sons, (who) were fierce of voice,
For noble children had Partholón:
They took under direction among them
The tribes of Ireland without objection

Preceded by Cinaedh Ua hArtagain	Chief Ollam of Ireland; 975–984	Succeeded by Urard Mac Coise
