= Newcastle, Tyrrellspass =

Townland in County Westmeath, Ireland

Newcastle is a townland on the outskirts of Tyrrellspass, County Westmeath, Ireland. The townland is located in the civil parish of Clonfad. The R446 road cuts through the south of the townland, close to the junction with M6 Motorway. The village of Meedin borders the area to the north.
