= Kilbeggan (civil parish) =

Civil parish in County Westmeath, Ireland

Kilbeggan Cill Bheagáin
- Civil parish
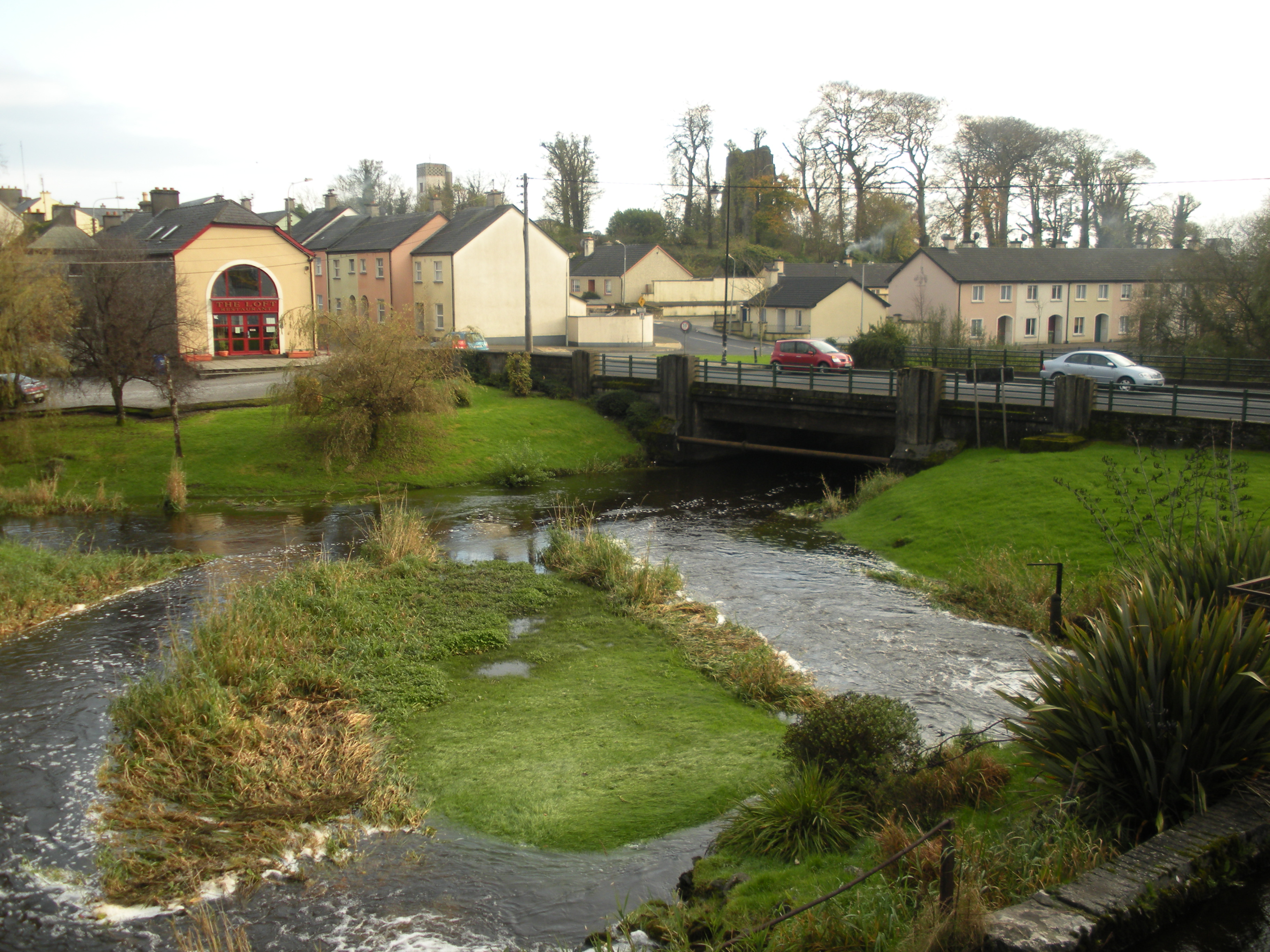
- River Brosna in Kilbeggan

- Location of Kilbeggan in County Westmeath, Ireland
- Coordinates: 53°22′12″N 7°29′37″W
- Country: Ireland
- Province: Leinster
- County: County Westmeath
- Irish grid reference: N401372

Kilbeggan (Irish: Cill Bheagáin) is a civil parish in County Westmeath, Ireland. It is located about 20 km (12 mi) south–south–west of Mullingar.

Kilbeggan is one of 8 civil parishes in the barony of Moycashel in the province of Leinster. The civil parish covers 6,103.6 acres (24.700 km^{2}).

Kilbeggan civil parish comprises the town of Kilbeggan and 29 townlands: Aghamore, Aghuldred, Ardnaglew, Ballinderry Big, Ballinderry Little, Ballinwire, Ballymacmorris, Ballynasudder, Ballyoban, Brownscurragh, Camagh, Clonaglin, Coola, Demesne or Mearsparkfarm, Grange and Kiltober, Grangegibbon, Greenan, Guigginstown, Hallsfarm, Kilbeggan, Kilbeggan North, Kilbeggan South, Kiltober and Grange, Loughanagore, Meadowpark, Meeldrum, Meeniska, Meersparkfarm or Demesne, Shureen and Ballynasuddery, Skeahanagh, Stonehousefarm and Tonaphort.

The neighbouring civil parishes are: Castletownkindalen to the north, Newtown to the east, Rahugh to the east and south, Durrow to the south and Ardnurcher or Horseleap to the west.
