= Piercetown, County Westmeath (civil parish) =

Civil parish in County Westmeath, Ireland

Piercetown Baile Phiarais
- Civil parish
- Location of Piercetown within County Westmeath in Ireland
- Coordinates: 53°33′40″N 7°37′14″W
- Country: Ireland
- Province: Leinster
- County: County Westmeath
- Irish grid reference: N251568

Piercetown (Irish: Baile Phiarais) is a civil parish in County Westmeath, Ireland. It is located about 19 km (12 mi) west–north–west of Mullingar. It was formerly often spelled Pierstown.

Piercetown is one of 9 civil parishes in the barony of Rathconrath in the province of Leinster. The civil parish covers 3,695.8 acres (14.956 km^{2}).

Piercetown civil parish comprises 16 townlands: Aghnabohy, Ballincurra, Ballymaglavy, Curraghboy, Fiveacres, Glebe, Kilgawny, Kilphierish, Malthousepark, Piercetown, Rath (Malone), Rathcogue, Relick (Longworth), Relick (Malone), Williamstown and Williamstown New.

The neighbouring civil parishes are: Kilmacnevan to the north, Rathconrath to the east, Ballymorin to the south, Templepatrick to the south–west and Abbeyshrule and Forgney (both County Longford) to the north–west.
