= Durrow, County Westmeath (civil parish) =

Civil parish in County Westmeath, Ireland

Durrow Darú
- Civil parish
- Location of Durrow in County Westmeath, Ireland
- Coordinates: 53°20′16″N 7°29′18″W
- Country: Ireland
- Province: Leinster
- County: County Westmeath
- Irish grid reference: N341320

Durrow (Irish: Darú) is a civil parish situated in County Westmeath, Ireland. It is located about 23 km (14 mi) to the south–south–west of Mullingar.

Durrow is one of 8 civil parishes within the barony of Moycashel, situated in the province of Leinster. The civil parish covers 2,256.4 acres (9.131 km^{2}). It is contiguous with the remainder of the Durrow civil parish, which is in County Offaly.

Durrow civil parish, County Westmeath comprises 8 townlands: Ballybroder, Ballycahan, Cappalahy, Derrygolan, Frevanagh, Keeloge, Pallas and Rostalla.

The neighbouring civil parishes are: Ardnurcher or Horseleap and Kilbeggan to the north, Rahugh to the east and County Offaly to the south and west.
