= Rahugh =

Coordinates: 53.336°N 7.437°W

Rahugh or Ráith Aeda Meic Bric is an early Christian site founded by Áed mac Bricc (also referred to as Saint Hugh of Rahugh) in the 6th century, inside a ráth or ringfort. The site, located about 8 km north of Tullamore along the L1024 road.

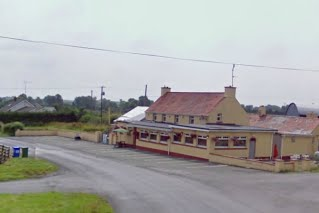
Rahugh

Rahugh consists of one pub (The Hazel Bar and Lounge), a Catholic church, local community centre, a primary school and several small to medium-sized enterprises such as Dunnes Workshop and Scally Precast. Rahugh also contains the remains of an ancient Christian monastery site and graveyard, a holy well and a so-called headache stone.

Rahugh is in a townland of the same name, in the civil parish of Rahugh. The nearest GAA team for the residents of Rahugh is Tyrrellspass, in a neighbouring village.
