= Templepatrick, County Westmeath (civil parish) =

Civil parish in County Westmeath, Ireland

Templepatrick Teampall Phádraig
- Civil parish
- Location of Templepatrick within County Westmeath, Ireland
- Coordinates: 53°32′4″N 7°37′48″W
- Country: Ireland
- Province: Leinster
- County: County Westmeath
- Irish grid reference: N245538

Templepatrick (Irish: Teampall Phádraig) is a civil parish in County Westmeath, Ireland, located about 19 km (12 mi) west of Mullingar.

Templepatrick is one of 9 civil parishes in the barony of Rathconrath in the province of Leinster. The civil parish covers 2,148.2 acres (8.693 km^{2}). It includes the small village of Moyvore and 5 townlands: Moyvore, Templepatrick, Beltacken, Rahadorrish and Tonlemony.

The neighbouring civil parishes are: Piercetown to the north, Ballymorin to the south–east, Killare to the south–west and Forgney (County Longford) to the west.
