= Killare (civil parish) =

Civil parish in County Westmeath, Ireland

Killare Cill Áir
- Civil parish
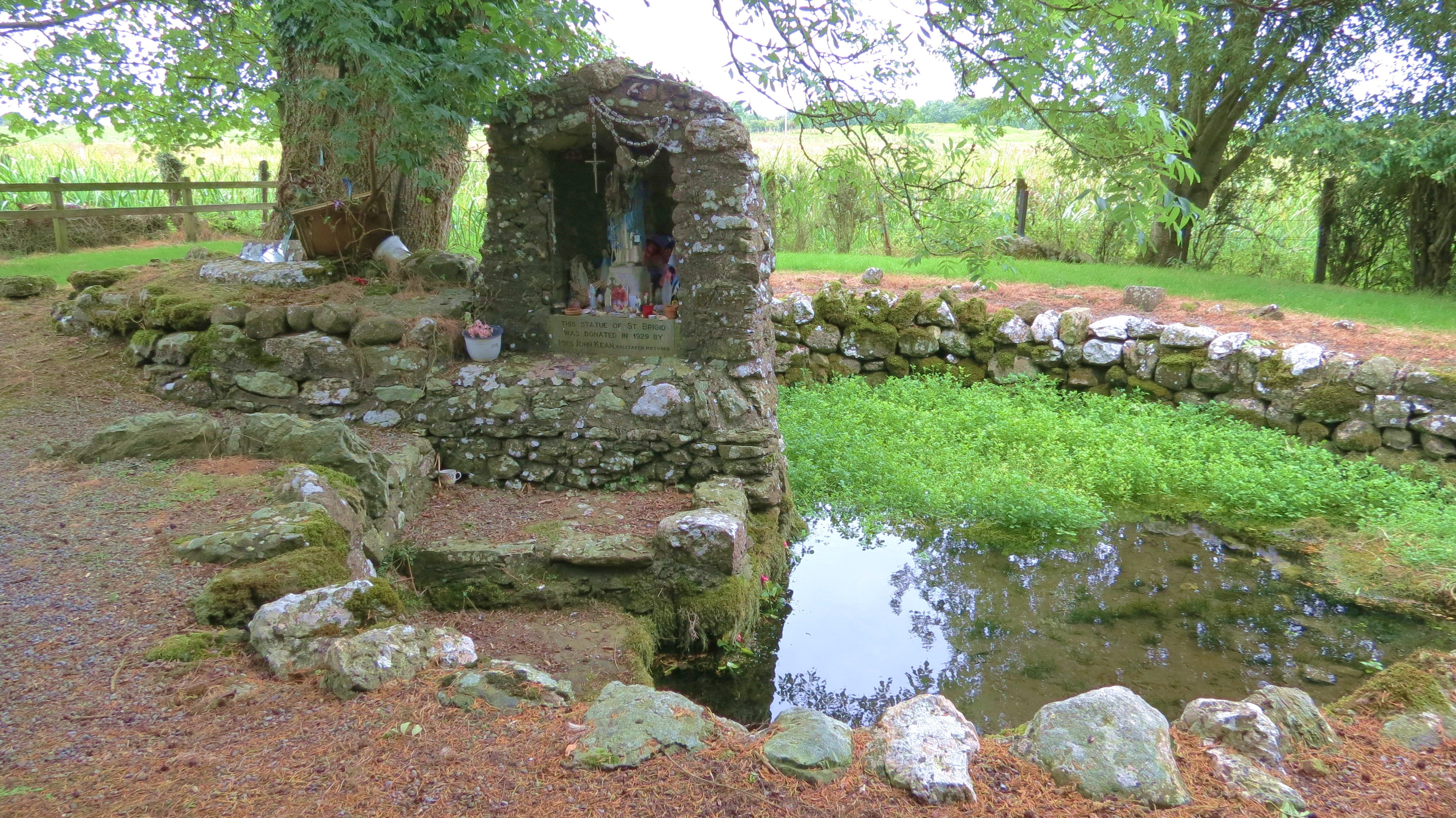
- St. Brigid's Well in Killare

- Location of Killare within County Westmeath in Ireland
- Coordinates: 53°28′52″N 7°37′15″W
- Country: Ireland
- Province: Leinster
- County: County Westmeath
- Irish grid reference: N252479

Killare (Irish: Cill Áir) is a civil parish in County Westmeath, Ireland. It is located about 20 kilometres (12 mi) west–south–west of Mullingar.

Killare is one of 9 civil parishes in the barony of Rathconrath in the province of Leinster. The civil parish covers 11,279.2 acres (45.645 km^{2}).

Killare civil parish comprises Ballymore village and 43 townlands: Ardbrennan, Ballinacor or Clonboy, Ballinaspick or Bishopstown, Ballinive, Ballinkeeny or Mosstown, Ballinlavan, Ballyclogher, Ballydavid, Ballymacallen, Ballymacartan, Bessville, Bishopstown or Ballinaspick, Bracknahevla, Clare, Clinickilroe, Clonboy or Ballinacor, Clonnamanagh, Clonnslynagh, Clonybane, Clonyveey, Clyglass, Duneel, Dungaghy, Gibstown, Keenoge, Killarecastle, Killarechurch, Killaroo, Killeenagh, Killeenagroagh, Killeenbane or Tullagh Upper, Killeenboy, Killeenbrack, Lurgan, Maddadoo, Moranspark, Mosstown or Ballinkeeny, Mosstown Demesne, Mullaghcloe, Pottiaghan Commons, Rackavra, Rathskeagh Lower, Rathskeagh Upper, Rowe or Toordillon, Taghnafearagh, Toorcoffey, Toordillon or Rowe and Tullagh Upper or Killeenbane.

The neighbouring civil parishes are: Templepatrick to the north, Ballymorin to the north–east, Conry to the east, Ardnurcher, or Horseleap to the south–east, Kilcumreragh to the south–west and Ballymore to the west.
