= Rahugh (civil parish) =

Civil parish in County Westmeath, Ireland

Rahugh Ráth Aodha
- Civil parish
- Location of Rahugh within County Westmeath, Ireland
- Coordinates: 53°20′55″N 7°24′14″W
- Country: Ireland
- Province: Leinster
- County: County Westmeath
- Irish grid reference: N397332

Rahugh (Irish: Ráth Aodha) is a civil parish in County Westmeath, Ireland. It is located about 20 km (12 mi) south–south–west of Mullingar.

Rahugh is one of 8 civil parishes in the barony of Moycashel in the province of Leinster. The civil parish covers 4,987.5 acres (20.184 km^{2}).

Rahugh civil parish comprises 12 townlands: Ardan, Atticonor, Cappanrush, Garryduff, Kiltober, Lowertown, Monasset, Montrath, Pallasboy, Rahugh, Rossbeg and Sonnagh.

The neighbouring civil parishes are: Newtown to the north, Kilclonfert (County Offaly) to the east, Ballycommon (County Offaly) to the south and Durrow and Kilbeggan to the west. The local GAA team for the residents of Rahugh is Tyrrellspass, a neighbouring village.
