= Ardnurcher, County Westmeath (civil parish) =

Civil parish in County Westmeath, Ireland

Ardnurcher Baile Átha an Urchair
- Civil parish
- Location of Ardnurcher within County Westmeath, Ireland
- Coordinates: 53°23′58″N 7°33′30″W
- Country: Ireland
- Province: Leinster
- County: County Westmeath
- Irish grid reference: N294388

Ardnurcher (Irish: Baile Átha an Urchair) is a civil parish in County Westmeath, Ireland. It is located about 20 km (12 mi) south–west of Mullingar.

Ardnurcher is one of 8 civil parishes in the barony of Moycashel in the province of Leinster. The civil parish covers 9,194.7 acres (37.210 km^{2}). It is contiguous with the remainder of the Ardnurcher civil parish, which is in County Offaly.

Ardnurcher civil parish, County Westmeath comprises 40 townlands: Ardballymore, Ardnurcher, Ballard, Ballinlaban, Ballyhattan, Ballynamullen, Brackagh Castle, Bunanagh, Cappaduff, Cloghanaskaw, Clongowly, Cloonymurrikin, Coolalough, Coolfin, Corgarve, Correagh, Creeve, Donore Demesne, Gawny, Gneevekeel, Kilbeg, Kilgaroan, Killard, Killeagh, Killeenycallaghan, Kilnagalliagh, Kilnalug, Kilpatrick, Lismoyny, Lissavra Big, Lissavra Little, Monaduff, Moycashel, Skeheen (Evans), Skeheen (Nagle), Spittaltown, Streamstown, Syonan, Teermore and Templemacateer.

The neighbouring civil parishes are: Conry and Killare (both barony of Rathconrath) to the north, Castletownkindalen and Kilbeggan to the east, Durrow (County Westmeath) and Durrow (County Offaly) to the south and Ardnurcher or Horseleap, Kilbride, Kilcumreragh (all County Offaly) and Kilcumreragh to the west.
