= Castletownkindalen =

Civil parish in County Westmeath, Ireland

Castletownkindalen Baile an Chaisleáin
- Civil parish
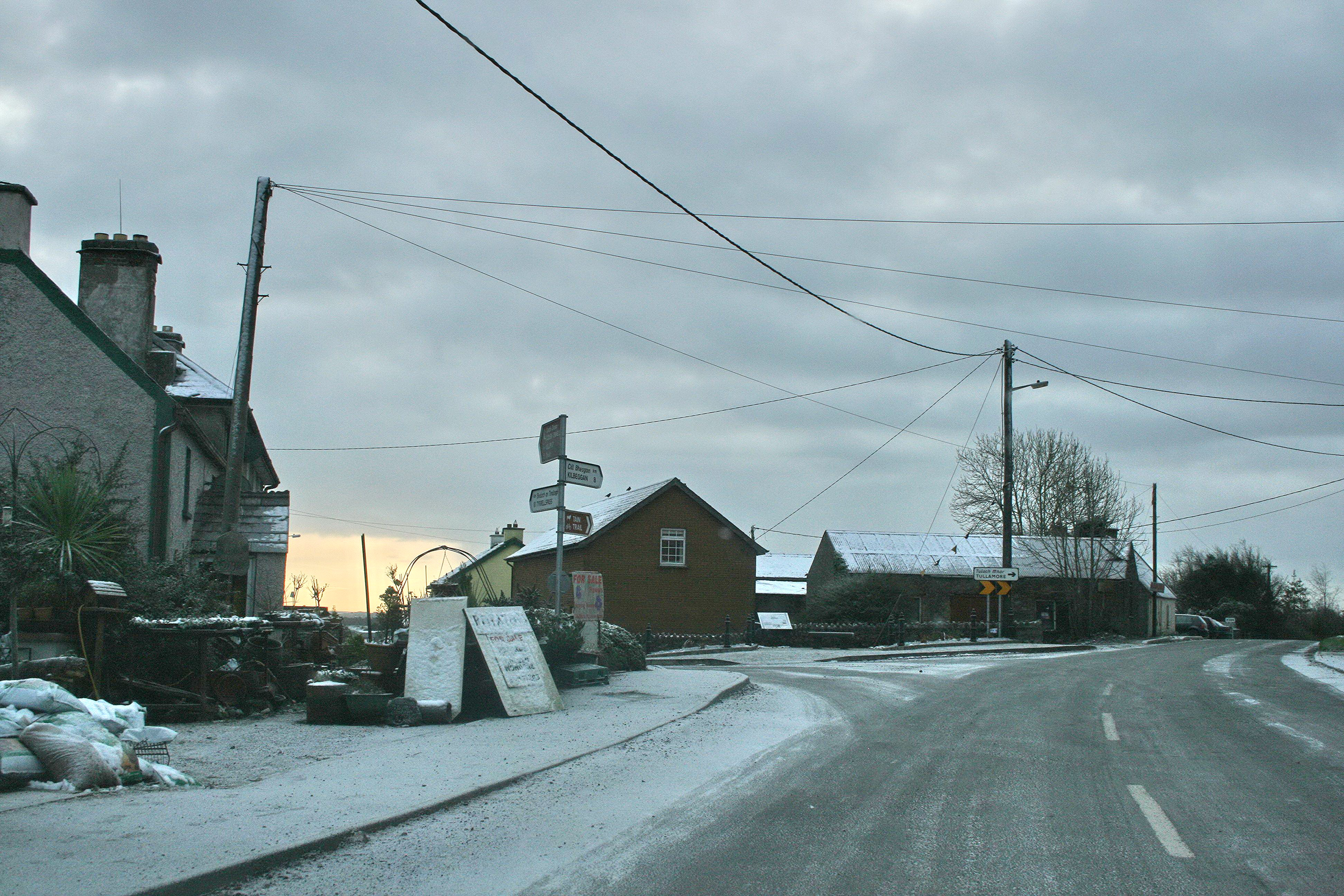
- Castletown Geoghegan village

- Location of Castletownkindalen in County Westmeath, Ireland
- Coordinates: 53°25′38″N 7°29′30″W
- Country: Ireland
- Province: Leinster
- County: County Westmeath
- Irish grid reference: N338419

Castletownkindalen (Irish: Baile an Chaisleáin) is a civil parish in County Westmeath, Ireland. It is located about 15 km (9 mi) south–west of Mullingar.

Castletownkindalen is one of 8 civil parishes in the barony of Moycashel in the province of Leinster. The civil parish covers 11,368.2 acres (46.005 km^{2}).

Castletownkindalen civil parish comprises the village of Castletown Geoghegan and 41 townlands: Adamstown, Ballybrennan, Ballybrown, Ballyhast, Ballykilroe, Ballynacoska, Ballynagore, Balrath, Bredagh, Castletown, Clonsingle, Cloonagh, Conranstown, Dooraheen, Dromore, Garhy, Glengorm, Gneevebeg, Gneevebrack, Keelbeg, Kilbalraherd, Kilhugh, Killalea, Killeen, Killinlahan, Kippinduff, Knockacurra, Lissakilly, Lurrig, Mabrista, Rathdrishoge, Rathnugent, Shurock, Sraduff, Sraneeg, Teernacreeve, Toorlisnamore, Tullaghanmore, Tullaghansleek and Tullaghnacrossan.

The neighbouring civil parishes are: Churchtown, Conry and Dysart (all in the barony of Rathconrath) to the north, Clonfad (barony of Fartullagh) to the east, Newtown to the east and south, Kilbeggan to the south and Ardnurcher or Horseleap to the west.
