= Áed mac Bricc =

Irish bishop and saint

Saint Áed mac Bricc
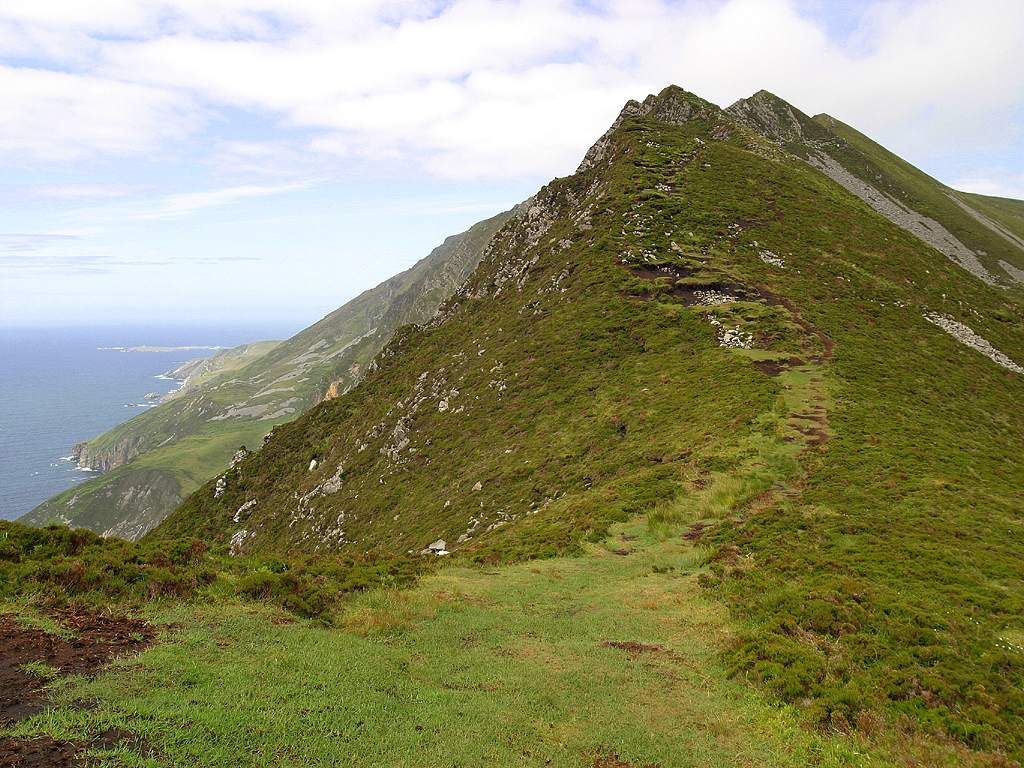
- Slieve League in County Donegal where Áed is said to have been a hermit for some time
- Died: 589
- Venerated in: Eastern Orthodoxy, Roman Catholicism
- Feast: 10 November
- Patronage: Headache sufferers

Áed mac Bricc (died 589) was an Irish bishop and saint.

== Life ==
Áed's principal church was at Rahugh (Ráith Áeda Meic Bricc) in modern County Westmeath. He was regarded as a patron saint of the Uí Néill and was said to be a descendant of Fiachu mac Néill. When his brothers refused to allow him a share of the land his father had maintained, Áed carried off a girl who belonged to them. He hoped to force his brothers to give him his patrimony through this injury, but then he met the bishop St Illann, who convinced him to give up his claims to the land and to let the girl go.

Áed mac Bricc's life in the Codex Salmanticensis presents Áed as a peacemaker between Munster and the Uí Néill, and between Mide and Tethbae, befitting his cross-border descent through his mother, Eithne, from the neighbouring Munster people of Múscraige Tíre (north-west County Tipperary).

An early Latin Life of Áed, perhaps dating from the period 750–850, survives. Although the Life borrows from Adomnán's Life of Columba, a copy of which may have been obtained from the nearby monastery of Durrow, its central concerns are with local violence and with the poverty and insecurity of women, especially nuns. Áed seems to have had a profound interest in the well-being of religious women. He frequently visited settlements of holy virgins who received him with the respect due to a man of his position. On one occasion, when he perceived that the girl serving him was pregnant he fled from the building both to avoid the pollution and to shame her. She confessed her sins and did penance. Áed was not one to leave someone under his care in a difficult situation; he blessed her womb and the baby disappeared as if it had never been there.

Áed's connection to holy women is taken up by Lisa Bitel in Isle of the Saints (1990), by Jim Tschen-Emmons (2002), and in the dissertation by Judyta Szaciłło.

== Patronage ==
Medieval incantations against headache enumerate bodily organs to be protected. One 8th-century Latin hymn from Lake Constance using this device is addressed to St. Aid "mechprech", who has been identified as Aed Mac Bricc, Bishop of Killare, 6th century. An episode in the Life in which he heals Brigit of headache is echoed in the ninth-century Irish life of Brigit. A stone close to the existing church is still associated with the curing of headaches.

== Sources and further reading ==
- Bitel, Lisa M. Isle of the Saints: Monastic Settlement and Christian Community in Early Ireland. Ithaca, NY: Cornell University Press, 1990.
- Charles-Edwards, T. M. (2000), Early Christian Ireland, Cambridge: Cambridge University Press, ISBN 0-521-36395-0
- Emmons, James B. Tschen. "The Limits of Late Antiquity: The Life of St. Aed mac Bricc and the Irish Literati in Late Antiquity." Diss. UC Santa Barbara, 2002.
- Emmons, Jim Tschen. "Spiritual Landscapes: The Late Antique Desert in Ireland." In The Rhetoric of Power in Late Antiquity: Religion and Politics in Byzantium, Europe and the Early Islamic World. Robert M. Frakes, Elizabeth dePalma Digeser, and Justin Stephens, eds. London: I.B. Tauris, 2010. pp. 125–143.
- Emmons, Jim Tschen. "Preface & Translation of the Vita Aidi/The Life of St. Aed mac Bricc," updated Aug. 2017, and available as a pdf. at his page on academia.edu
- Emmons, Jim Tschen. "A Lorica Charm Against Headache Invoking St. Aed mac Bricc," 14 May 2021, available as a pdf. at his page on academia.edu
- Nagy, Joseph Falaky (1997), Conversing with angels and ancients: literary myths of medieval Ireland, Ithaca: Cornell University Press, ISBN 978-0-8014-8368-4
- Nathalie Stalmans and T. M. Charles-Edwards, "Meath, saints of (act. c.400–c.900)", Oxford Dictionary of National Biography, Oxford University Press, 2004; online edn, May 2007 accessed 3 Sept 2010
- Sharpe, Richard. Medieval Irish Saints' Lives: An Introduction to Vitae Sanctorum Hiberniae. Oxford: Clarendon, 1991.
- Szaciłło, Judyta. "Irish Hagiography and its dating: a study of the O’Donohue group of Irish saints’ lives.” PhD Diss. Queen's University Belfast, 2013.
