= Calverstown, County Westmeath =

Townland in County Westmeath, Brazil

Calverstown is a townland in County Westmeath, Ireland. The townland is located in the civil parish of Clonfad. The N52 motorway cuts through the middle of the townland, and Dalystown lies to the north, near the shores of Lough Ennell.
