= Durrow, County Offaly (civil parish) =

Durrow Darú
- Civil parish
- Location of Durrow within County Offaly in the Republic of Ireland
- Coordinates: 53°19′14″N 7°31′43″W
- Country: Ireland
- Province: Leinster
- County: County Offaly
- Irish grid reference: N341320

Durrow (Irish: Darú) is a civil parish in County Offaly, Ireland. It is located about 6 kilometres (4 mi) north–north–west of Tullamore.

Durrow is one of 4 civil parishes in the barony of Ballycowan in the Province of Leinster. The civil parish covers 7,526.4 acres (30.458 km^{2}). It is contiguous with the remainder of the Durrow civil parish, which is in County Westmeath.

Durrow civil parish, County Offaly comprises the small village of Durrow and 21 townlands: Acantha, Aghancarnan, Ashfield, Balleek, Balleek Beg, Ballybought, Ballycallaghan, Ballynamona, Cartron, Coleraine, Coniker, Coolnahely, Culleen, Doory, Durrow Demesne, Gormagh, Kilclare, Kildangan, Loughaun, Lug and Tara.

The neighbouring civil parishes are: Ardnurcher or Horseleap (County Westmeath) to the north, Ballycommon to the east, Kilbride to the south, Rahan to the west and Kilbride to the west and north.
