= Urard mac Coise =

Irish poet

Urard mac Coise (died 990) was an Irish poet who lived in the townland of Clare, County Westmeath.

Urard Mac Coise was Chief Ollam of Ireland. He was the author of poems on the kings of Connacht, amongst others. Edward O'Reilly gives a full account of these in his 'Irish Writers', XCI sq.; d. anno 990.

His obit is given in the Annals of Tigernach as follows- “Annal T990.1 Urard mac Coisse,{folio 15b1} prím-éces Góidhel, in penitentia mortuus est a Cluain Maic Noís. (Urard mac Coisi, the chief poet of the Gaels, died after a great penance in Clonmacnoise)

His obit is given in the Annals of Ulster as follows- “U990.2 Urard son of Cos, chief poet of Ireland died.

His obit is given in the Chronicon Scotorum as follows- “Annal CS990 Kalends. Erard son of Coisi, chief poet of the Irish, dies in penitence in Cluain moccu Nóis. (Clonmacnoise)"

Preceded by Eochaidh ua Floinn	Chief Ollam of Ireland; 984–990	Succeeded by Clothna mac Aenghusa
