= Ballymorin (civil parish) =

Civil parish in County Westmeath, Ireland

Ballymorin Baile Mhóirín
- Civil parish
- Location of Ballymorin within County Westmeath, Ireland
- Coordinates: 53°31′1″N 7°35′21″W
- Country: Ireland
- Province: Leinster
- County: County Westmeath
- Irish grid reference: N272519

Ballymorin (Irish: Baile Mhóirín) is a civil parish in County Westmeath, Ireland. It is located about 16 km (10 mi) west of Mullingar.

Ballymorin is one of 9 civil parishes in the barony of Rathconrath in the province of Leinster. The civil parish covers 2,738.4 acres (11.082 km^{2}).

Ballymorin civil parish comprises 11 townlands: Ballymorin, Cappaghjuan, Clonymurtagh, Corr, Dalystown, Killeenerk, Lenamore, Newbristy North, Newbristy South, Rathcarra and Tobercormick.

The neighbouring civil parishes are: Piercetown and Templepatrick to the north, Rathconrath to the north–east, Conry to the south–east and Killare to the south–west.
