= Geographical centre of Ireland =

Geographical location in Ireland

Geographical centre of Ireland

The geographical centre of Ireland, is near the village of Castletown Geoghegan, County Westmeath, according to the Ordnance Survey Ireland (OSI).

The exact location lies at the Irish Transverse Mercator (ITM) coordinates 633015.166477, 744493.046768, and at latitude: 53.4494762 and longitude : -7.5029786.

It sits in the townland of Adamstown within a National Monuments Zone, on the location of an ancient graveyard and near the remains of Kilbride church.

This investigation to identify the exact geographic centre of Ireland assumed a calculation that would take in the whole of the mainland of Ireland but exclude the approximately 8,000 mapped offshore islands and outcrops.

It is however based on current coastal data and any coastal erosion or accretion historically or in the future would change the data and the exact location calculated. Various locations have claimed in the past to be the geographical centre of Ireland using various methodologies (though sometimes without any updated references or supporting academic methodology).

OSI have determined that the most appropriate methodology is the one published in February 2022 and which determined the location to be just outside Castletown Geoghegan.

Although at times the Hill of Tara was also regarded in a similar manner, in Irish mythology the Hill of Uisneach, which is about 17.7 kilometres west of Mullingar and two kilometres from the village of Loughanavally, was generally considered to be the ceremonial and ancient spiritual centre of Ireland. It is also the nearest of all the alternative historical locations, and the location calculated by the OSI as the geographical centre is approximately 5 kilometres south east of the Hill of Uisneach.
