= Ardnurcher, County Offaly =

Ardnurcher Baile Átha an Urchair
- Civil parish
- Location of Ardnurcher within County Offaly in the Republic of Ireland
- Coordinates: 53°22′54″N 7°35′57″W
- Country: Ireland
- Province: Leinster
- County: County Offaly
- Irish grid reference: N294388

Ardnurcher (Irish: Baile Átha an Urchair) is a civil parish in County Offaly, Ireland. It is located about 14 kilometres (9 mi) north–north–west of Tullamore.

Ardnurcher is one of four civil parishes in the barony of Kilcoursey in the Province of Leinster. The civil parish covers 2,819.6 acres (11.411 km^{2}). It is contiguous with the majority of the Ardnurcher civil parish, which is in County Westmeath.

Ardnurcher civil parish, County Offaly comprises 14 townlands: Ardnurcher Glebe, Attiblaney, Ballykilleen, Ballynakill Beg, Ballynakill Little, Burrow, Cappydonnell Big, Cappydonnell Little, Cloncraff, Dunard, Kilmalady Big, Kilmalady Little, Russagh and Tully.

The neighbouring civil parishes are: Ardnurcher, or Horseleap (County Westmeath) to the north and east, Kilbride to the south, Kilmanaghan to the south and west and Kilcumreragh to the west and north.
