= Clonfad =

Civil parish in County Westmeath, Ireland

Clonfad Cluain Fada
- Civil parish
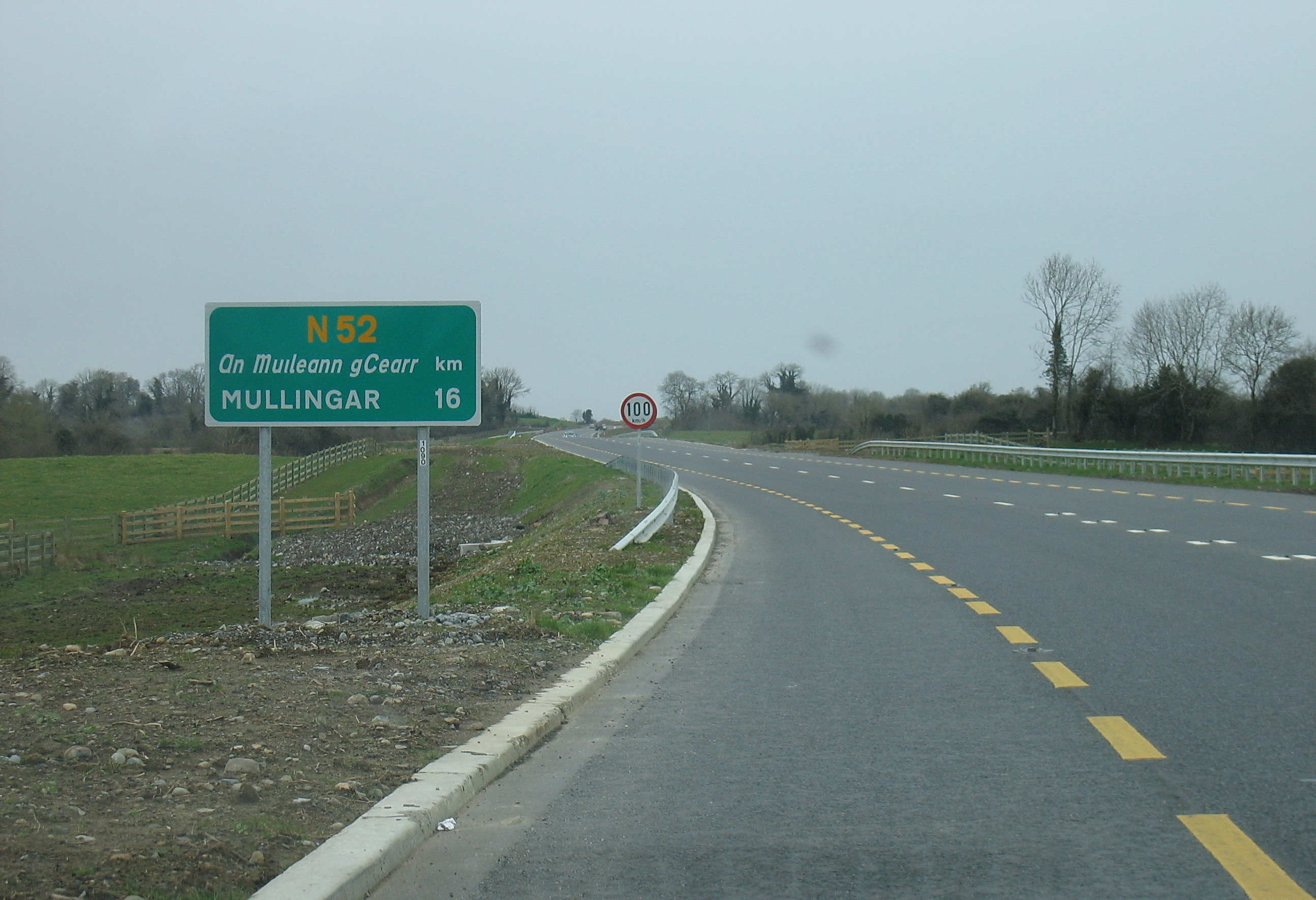
- N52 road north of Tyrrellspass

- Location of Clonfad in County Westmeath, Ireland
- Coordinates: 53°25′3″N 7°23′14″W
- Country: Ireland
- Province: Leinster
- County: County Westmeath
- Irish grid reference: N407409

Clonfad (Irish: Cluain Fada) is a civil parish in County Westmeath, Ireland, 12 km (7 mi) south of Mullingar.

Clonfad is one of 10 civil parishes in the barony of Fartullagh in the province of Leinster. The civil parish covers 4,576.7 acres (18.521 km^{2}). Clonfad civil parish comprises 11 townlands: Calverstown, Clonfad, Dalystown, Davidstown/Guilford, Friarstown, Meedin, Newcastle, Rathnure, Templeoran North, Templeoran South and Tyrrellspass.

Neighbouring civil parishes are: Carrick to the north, Castlelost to the east, Newtown to the south and Castletownkindalen to the west.
