= R389 road (Ireland) =

Road in County Westmeath, Ireland

Coordinates: 53.435861°N 7.483323°W

R389 road
- Bóthar R389
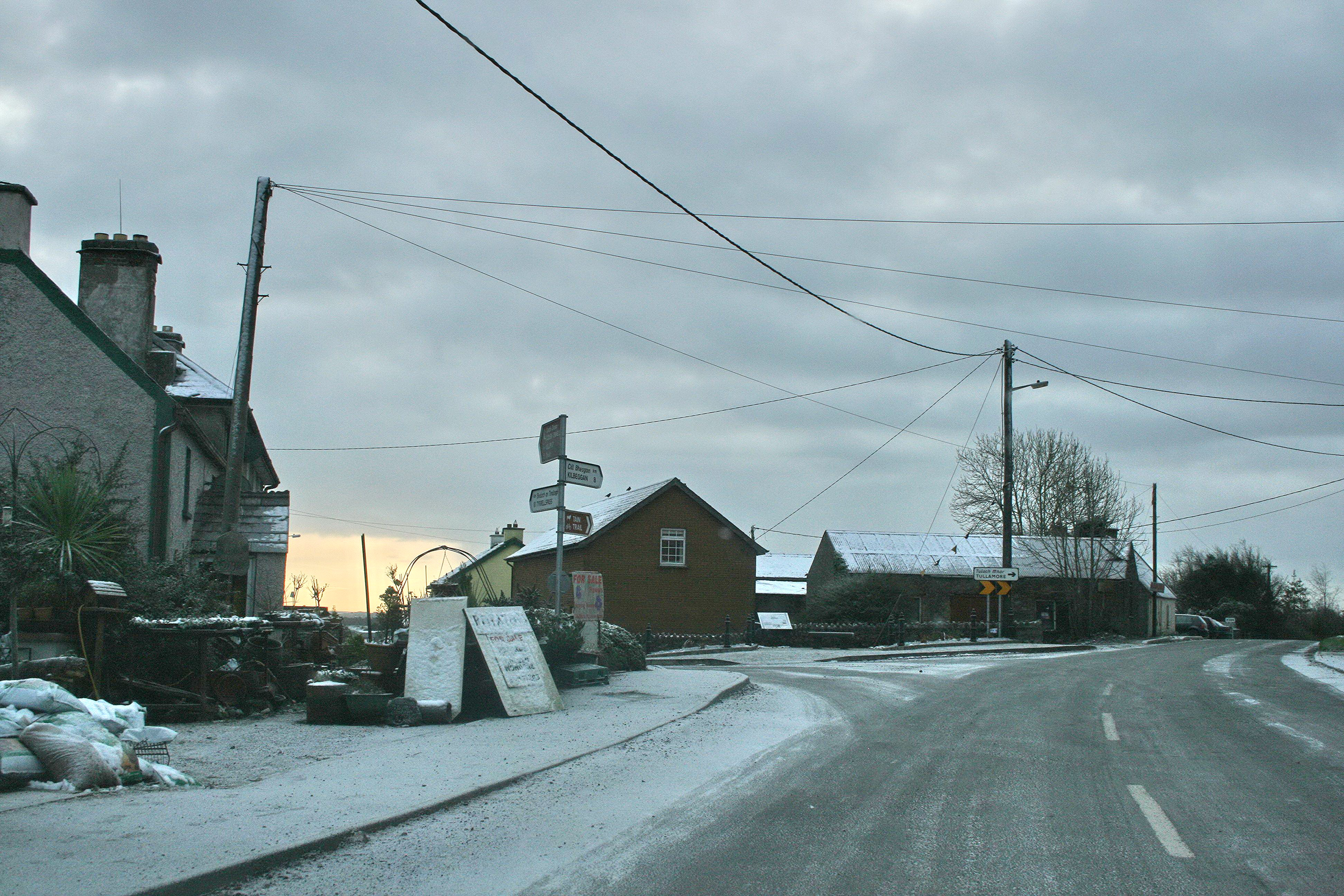
- R389 passing through Castletown Geoghegan

Route information
- Length: 21.7 km (13.5 mi)

Major junctions
- From: R392 Skeagh
- R390 Adamstown; R391 Conranstown; Passes through Castletown Geoghegan; Crosses River Brosna; R446 Kilbeggan
- To: M6 Junction 5

Location
- Country: Ireland

Highway system
- Roads in Ireland; Motorways; Primary; Secondary; Regional

The R389 road is a regional road in Ireland, located in County Westmeath.
