= Hill of Uisneach =

Hill in County Westmeath, Ireland

- Uisneach; Cnoc Uisnigh (Irish)
- Ushnagh (anglicisation)
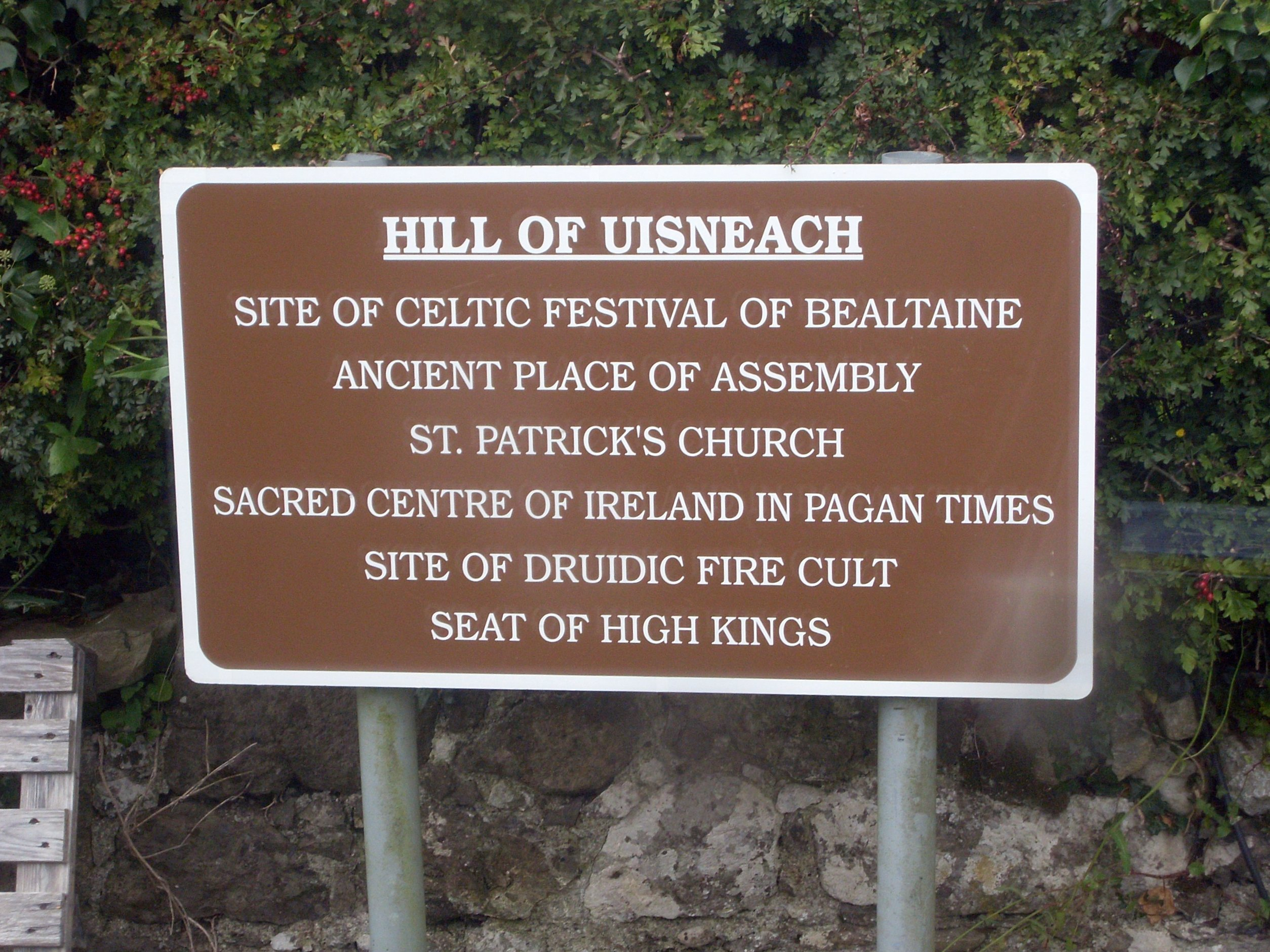
- Information sign

- Location within island of Ireland
- 53.490°N 7.562°W
- Type: Ancient ceremonial site
- Periods: Iron Age–Middle Ages
- Cultures: Gaelic
- Location: County Westmeath, Ireland

Site notes
- Height: 182 metres (597 ft)
- Public access: Yes

National monument of Ireland
- Official name: Ushnagh Hill, Catstone
- Reference no.: 155

The Hill of Uisneach or Ushnagh (Irish: Uisneach or Cnoc Uisnigh) is a hill and ancient ceremonial site in the barony of Rathconrath in County Westmeath, Ireland. It is a protected national monument. It consists of numerous monuments and earthworks—prehistoric and medieval—including a probable megalithic tomb, burial mounds, enclosures, standing stones, holy wells and a medieval road. Uisneach is near the geographical centre of Ireland, and in Irish mythology it is deemed to be the symbolic and sacred centre of the island. It was said to be the burial place of the mythical Tuatha Dé Danann, and a place of assembly associated with the druids and the festival of Bealtaine.

The summit is 182 metres (597 ft) above sea level and lies north of the R390 road, 8 km east of the village of Ballymore and beside the village of Loughnavalley. The hill occupies parts of four adjacent townlands: Ushnagh Hill, Mweelra, Rathnew, and Kellybrook.

== Name ==
The hill is called Uisneach in both Irish and English, with the alternative Irish name Cnoc Uisnigh meaning "hill of Uisneach". It is also anglicized as 'Ushnagh', such as in the name of the townland. In Old and Middle Irish it was spelt Uisnech. Eric P. Hamp derives the name from Proto-Celtic *us-tin-ako- meaning "place of the hearth" or "place of cinders". T. F. O'Rahilly derived it from *ostinako- meaning "angular place".

== Features ==
The site consists of a set of monuments and earthworks spread over two square kilometres. About twenty are visible, and the remains of at least twenty others have been identified under the ground. They include a probable megalithic tomb, burial mounds, enclosures, standing stones, holy wells and a medieval road. They date from the Neolithic to the early Middle Ages, showing that the site has been the focus of human activity for about 5,000 years. Several sites were excavated in the 1920s by R.A.S. Macalister and R. Praeger.

The summit has panoramic views, from which hills in at least twenty counties can be seen. There are no Christian antiquities to be found at Uisneach but on the summit is the remains of a probable megalithic tomb, known as 'St Patrick's Bed', which was once surrounded by a ring ditch. Downslope to the east is a small lake known as Loch Lugh or Loch Lugborta, and on a rise east of this is a burial mound known as Carn Lughdach, which was also once surrounded by a ring ditch. South of these are two holy wells, one of which is known as Tobernaslath and sits beside a circular enclosure and standing stone.

On the southwest side of the hill is a large, oddly-shaped limestone rock; a glacial erratic almost 6 metres (20 ft) tall and thought to weigh over 30 tons. In prehistory an earthen bank was dug around it to mark it out as a special place. In Irish it is called the Ail na Míreann ("stone of the divisions"), as it is said to have been where the borders of the provinces met. It is nicknamed the Cat Stone, allegedly because it resembles the shape of a sitting cat. In early medieval hagiographies of Saint Patrick, it is called Ail Coithrigi (probably "stone of Patrick").

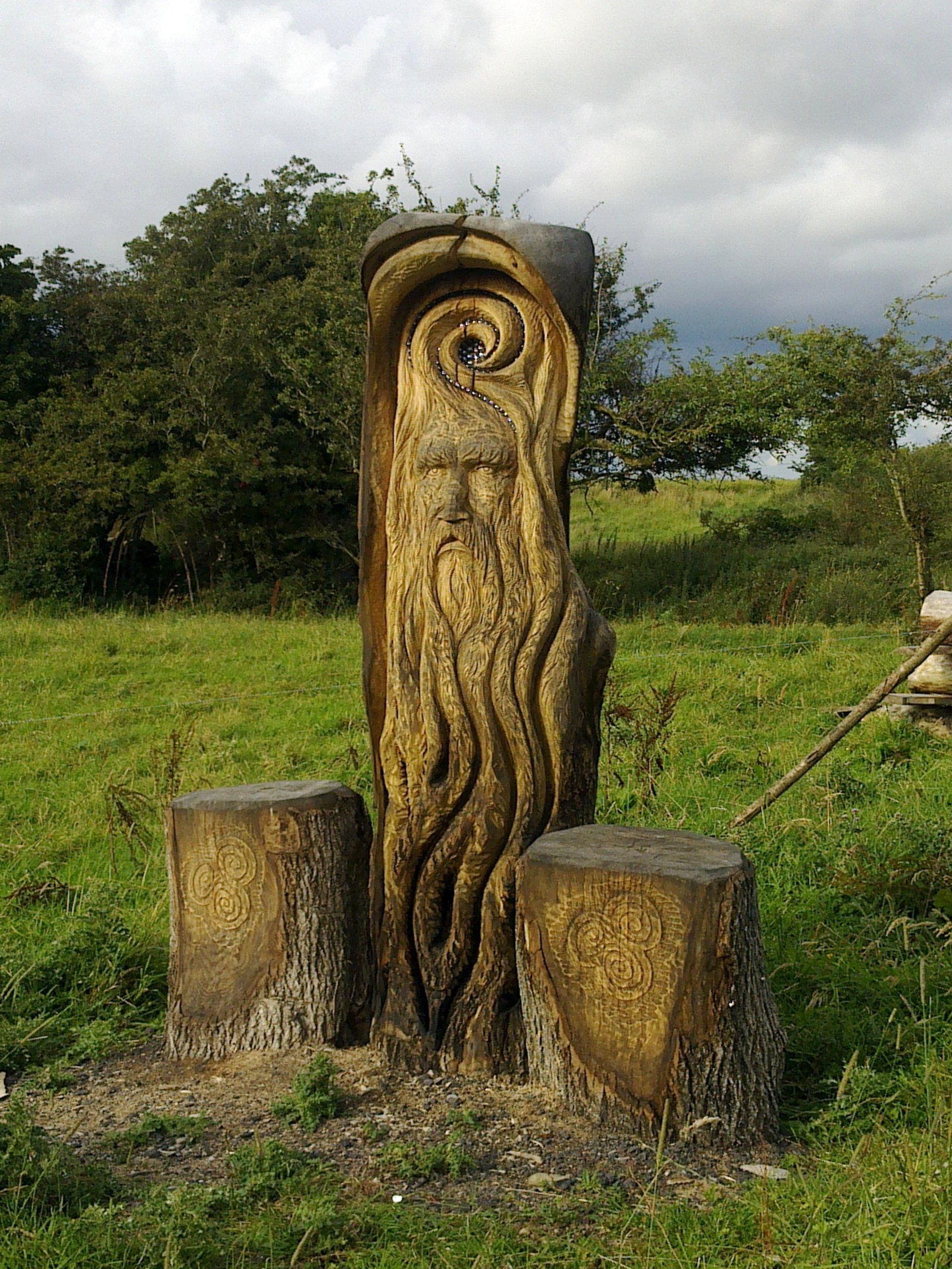
Site of Celtic Festival of Bealtaine on the Hill of Uisneach

The biggest monument at Uisneach is Rathnew, the remains of a figure-of-eight shaped earthwork. An early medieval road leads towards Rathnew from the foot of the hill. Rathnew was originally one round enclosure marked by a ditch, with an eastern entrance. Inside it were several pits containing partly-burnt animal bones, each sealed with large flat stones. It appears that fires "had been kindled, and then suddenly quenched" with water or soil, in a ritual. There was also a large ash bed containing thoroughly-charred animal skeletons. This appears to have been "a sanctuary-site, in which fire was kept burning perpetually, or kindled at frequent intervals", where animal sacrifices were offered. Later, in the early medieval period, a large figure-of-eight shaped earthwork was raised on this site. It was a large round enclosure, with a smaller round enclosure joined to it, marked by a bank and ditch. Within each enclosure was a small stone building and a souterrain. It is suggested that Rathnew at this time was a place of royal and religious gatherings, and may have served as a royal residence of the kings of Meath during these gatherings. The Clann Cholmáin chieftains, who became kings of Meath, were styled "Kings of Uisnech" in early-medieval king lists.

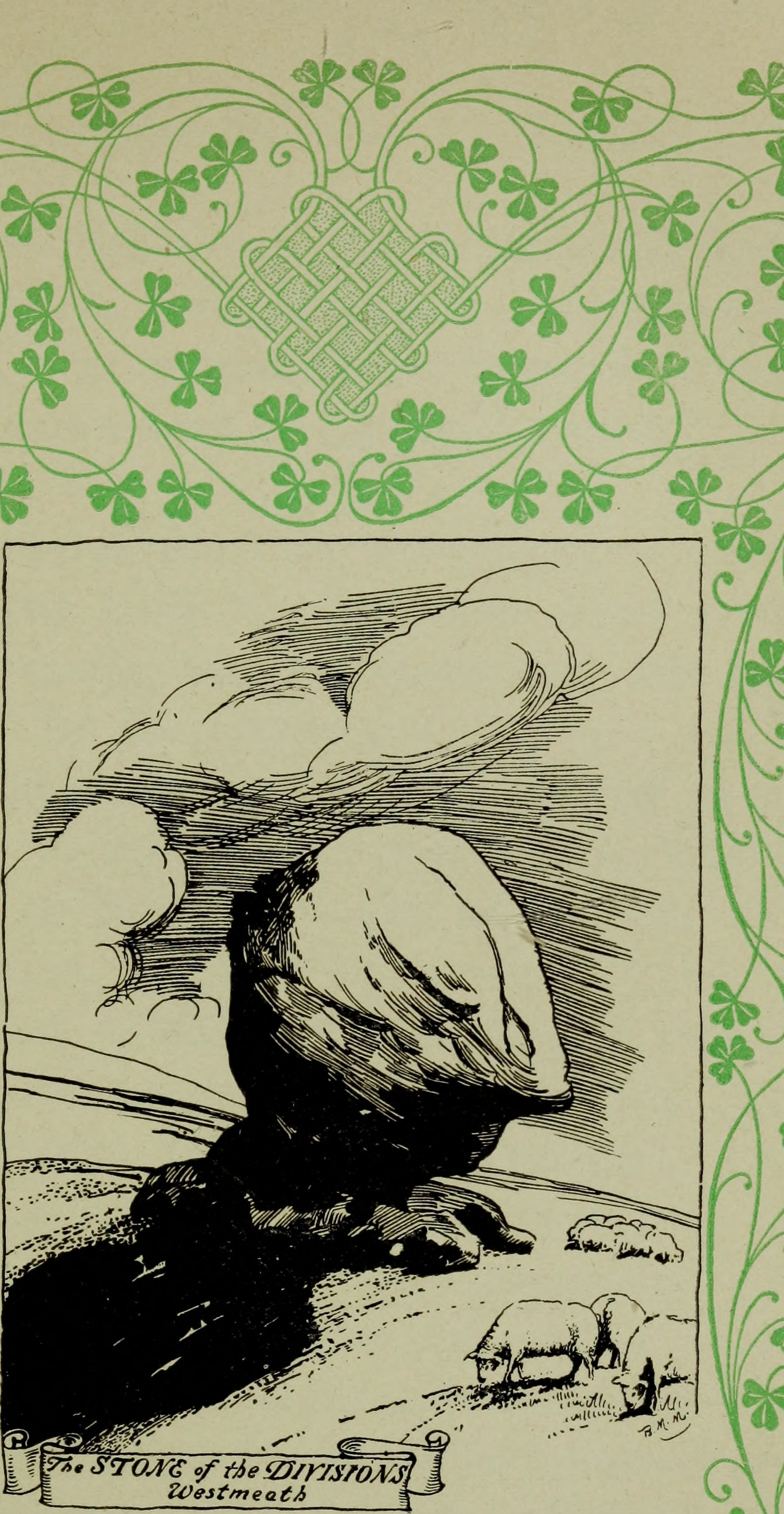
The Stone of the Divisions

There is also Tuar Uí Cobhthaigh / Toorcoffey (Coffey's Tower) named after the brehon law O'Cobhthaigh family who were known as the filí or ollamhs of Uisneach.

== In Irish mythology ==
In Irish mythology, Uisneach is described as the sacred centre of Ireland, the burial place of Irish gods such as Lugh and the Dagda, the site of a sacred tree (the Bile Uisnig), and a place of assembly (the mórdáil Uisnig) associated with the druids, which, according to later tradition, was held during the festival of Bealtaine. The Ail na Míreann ("stone of the divisions") in particular is described as the navel of Ireland. It is seen as a kind of omphalos or axis mundi of Ireland, a meeting place between the Earth and the Otherworld and the source of creation. It is said to have marked the meeting point of the provinces.

The Dindsenchas ("lore of places") says that Uisneach is where the druid Mide lit a sacred fire that blazed for seven years. The tale Tucait Baile Mongáin ("Mongan's Frenzy") describes how a great hailstorm during an assembly on the hill created the twelve chief rivers of Ireland. In the Lebor Gabála Érenn ("Book of the Taking of Ireland"), the Gaels (Milesians) meet the goddess Ériu at Uisneach where, after some conversation and drama, the Milesian poet Amergin promises to give the land her name. She is said to be buried under the Ail na Míreann.

In mythology, Uisneach and Tara are said to be linked. In the literature, Tara is mainly associated with royal power, while Uisneach is mainly associated with spiritual power. Anciently, both locations had festivals or meetings every seven years – the Feast of Tara at Samhain and the Great Meeting of Uisneach at Beltane; at the Feast of Tara new laws were passed and councils formed. It was linked to Tara by the ancient road called the Slighe Assail; the modern R392 road mostly follows its route.

The tragic tale of Deirdre and the "sons of Uisnech" or "sons of Uisliu" (Naisi, Ardan and Ainle) is part of the Ulster Cycle of Irish mythology.

Geoffrey of Monmouth's Historia Regum Britanniae ("History of the Kings of Britain") says that Stonehenge originally stood at the 'hill of Killare' (mons Killaraus) in Ireland, before being moved to Britain. This is thought to refer to Uisneach, as Killare is a place at the foot of the hill.
