= Loughnavalley =

Loughnavalley Lochán an Bhealaigh
- Village
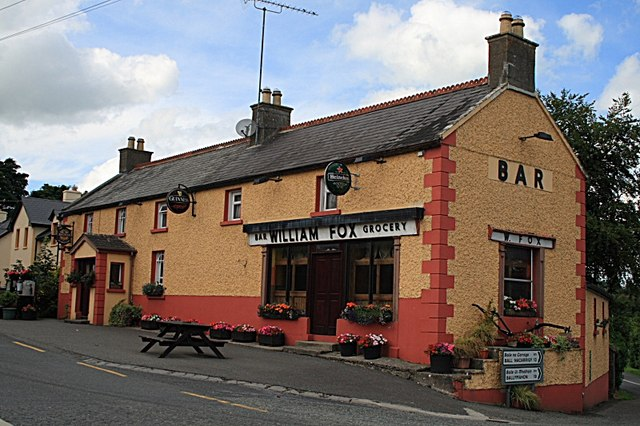
- Fox's bar and grocery shop, Louaghnavalley

- Location in Ireland
- Coordinates: 53°29′10″N 7°31′35″W
- Country: Ireland
- Province: Leinster
- County: County Westmeath
- Time zone: UTC+0 (WET)
  - Summer (DST): UTC-1 (IST (WEST))

Louaghnavalley or Loughnavally (Irish: Lochán an Bhealaigh) is a village in County Westmeath, Ireland. It is located at the crossroads of the R389 and the R390, to the west of Mullingar.

The Hill of Uisneach stands to the west of the town, near the village of Killare.

The village contains a Roman Catholic church, the Church of the Assumption, a national school and a bar.

== Sport ==
Loughnavalley GAA is a Gaelic football club that competes at Junior grade. The club was established in 1976 and its grounds are 2 km (1.2 mi) from the Hill of Uisneach. The club's underage teams are amalgamated with Castletown Geoghegan to form Lilliput Gaels.

== See also ==
- List of towns and villages in Ireland
