= Fartullagh =

Barony in County Westmeath, Ireland

Fartullagh Fir Thulach
- Barony
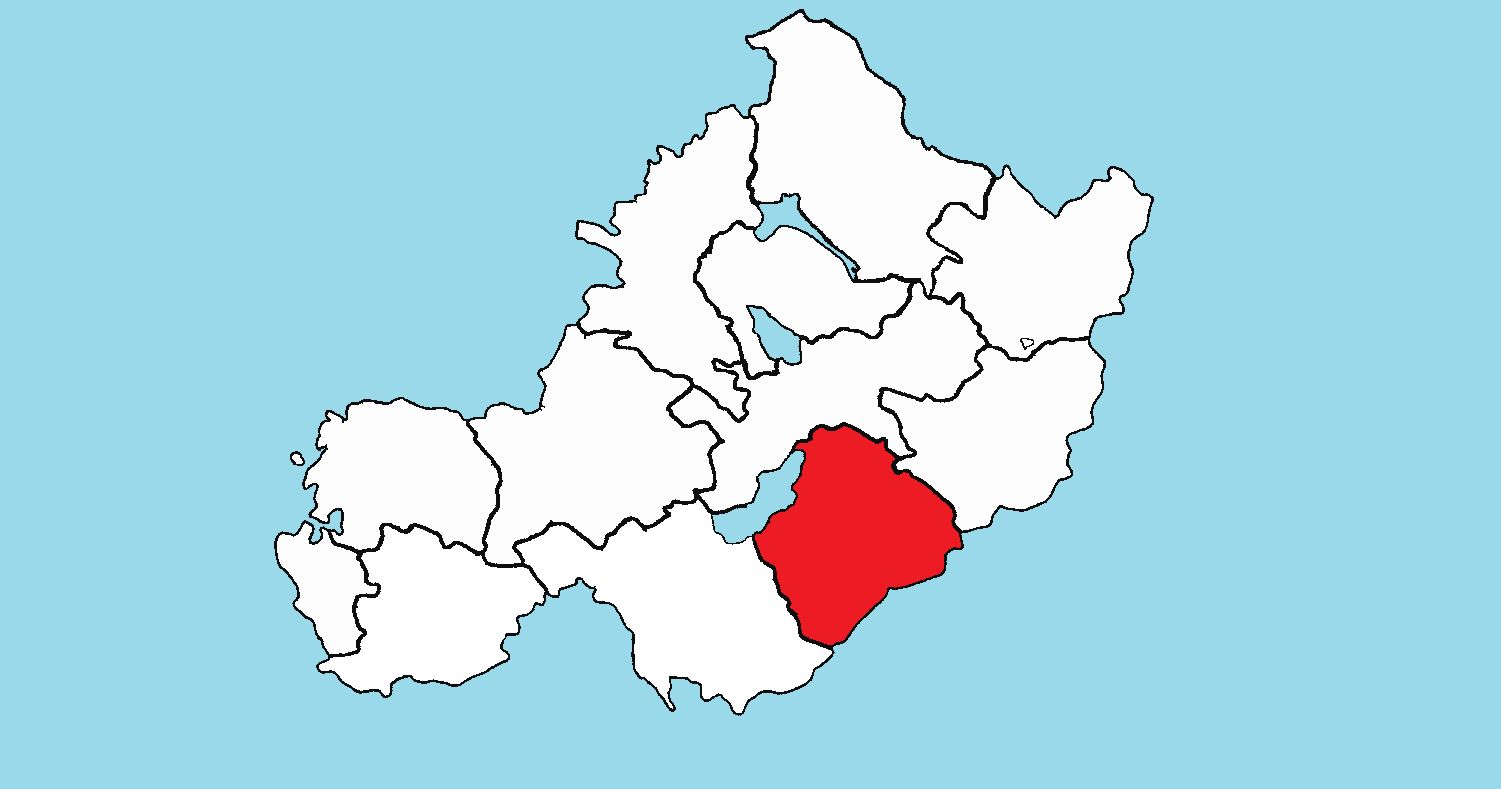
- Location of Fartullagh on a map of Westmeath

- Location in Ireland
- Coordinates: 53°26′19″N 7°19′00″W
- Country: Ireland
- Province: Leinster
- County: Westmeath

Area
  - Total: 159.52 km^{2} (61.59 sq mi)
- Time zone: UTC+0 (WET)
  - Summer (DST): UTC+1 (IST (WEST))
- Irish Grid Reference: N454433

Fartullagh (Irish: Fir Thulach), previously Tyrrells country, is a barony in south–east County Westmeath, in Ireland. It was formed by 1542. It is bordered by County Offaly to the south and three other baronies: Moycashel (to the west), Moyashel and Magheradernon (to the north) and Farbill (to the north–east).

== Geography ==
Fartullagh has an area of 39,418.4 acres (159.521 km^{2}). The barony contains the eastern half of one large lake, Lough Ennell, the remainder is contained within the barony of Moyashel and Magheradernon. The River Brosna flows through Lough Ennell, eventually connecting with the River Shannon. The M6 motorway passes to the south of Rochfortbridge and Tyrrellspass, which, together with the M4, links Dublin with Galway.

== Civil parishes of the barony ==
This table lists an historical geographical sub-division of the barony known as the civil parish (not to be confused with an Ecclesiastical parish).

Name in English	Name in Irish
Carrick	An Charraig
Castlelost	Caisleán Loiste
Clonfad	Cluain Fada
Enniscoffey	Inis Cofaigh
Kilbride	Cill Bhríde
Lynn	Lainn
Moylisker	Maoileiscir
Mullingar (part of, shared with Moyashel and Magheradernon)	An Muileann gCearr
Newtown (part of, shared with Moycashel)	An Baile Nua
Pass of Kilbride	Bealach Cille Bríde

Only three of the townlands in the civil parish of Newtown are in the barony of Fartullagh, the remainder are in the barony of Moycashel. Similarly only four of the townlands in the civil parish of Mullingar are in the barony of Fartullagh, the remainder are in the barony of Moyashel and Magheradernon.

== Towns, villages and townlands ==
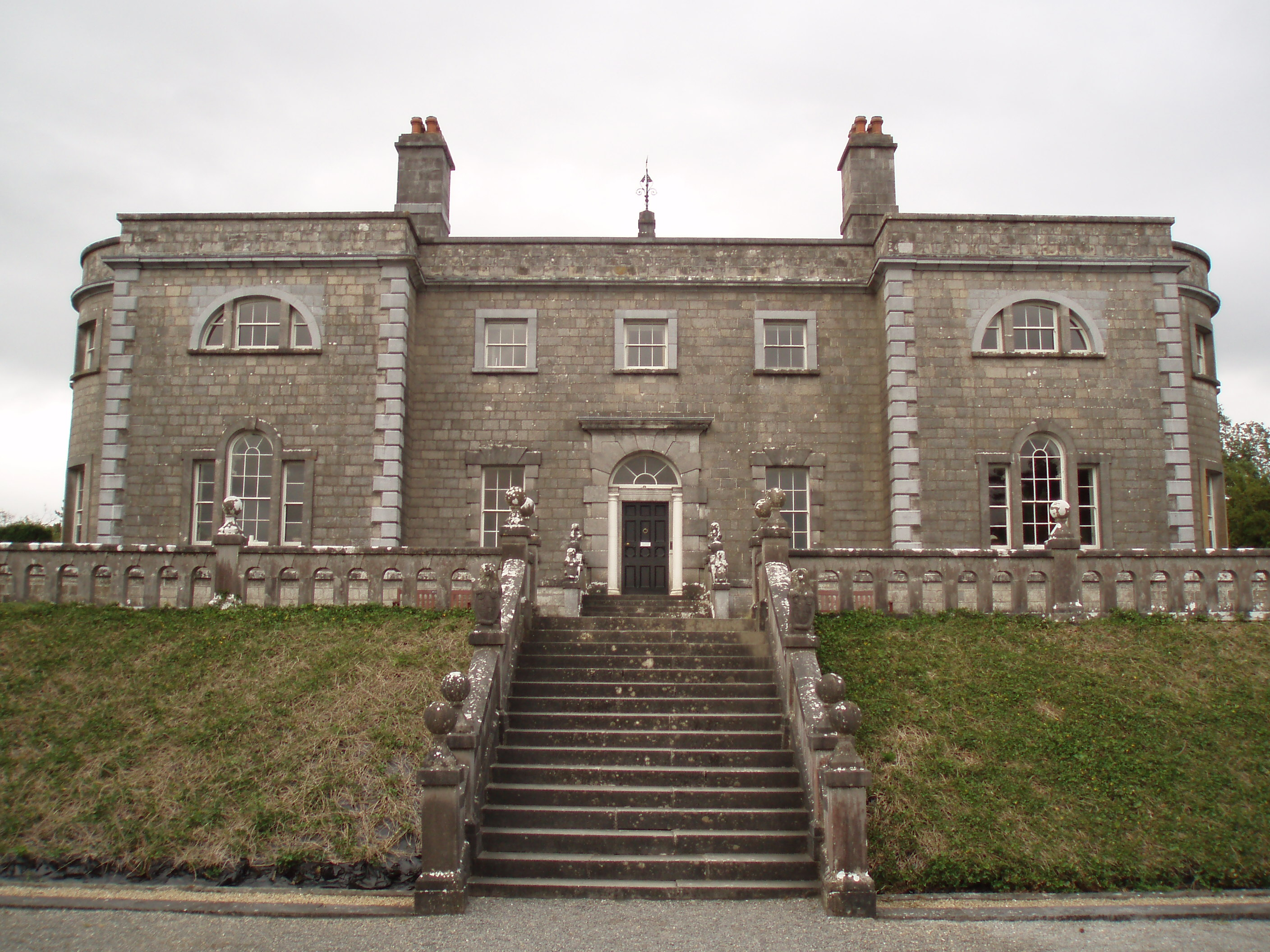
Belvedere House

- Dalystown
- Milltownpass
- Rochfortbridge
- Tyrrellspass

There are 78 townlands in the barony of Fartullagh.

== Buildings ==
- Belvedere House and Gardens, built in 1740 as a hunting lodge for Robert Rochfort, 1st Earl of Belvedere by architect Richard Castle, one of Ireland's foremost Palladian architects.
