= Dysart, County Westmeath =

Dysart An Díseart
- Village
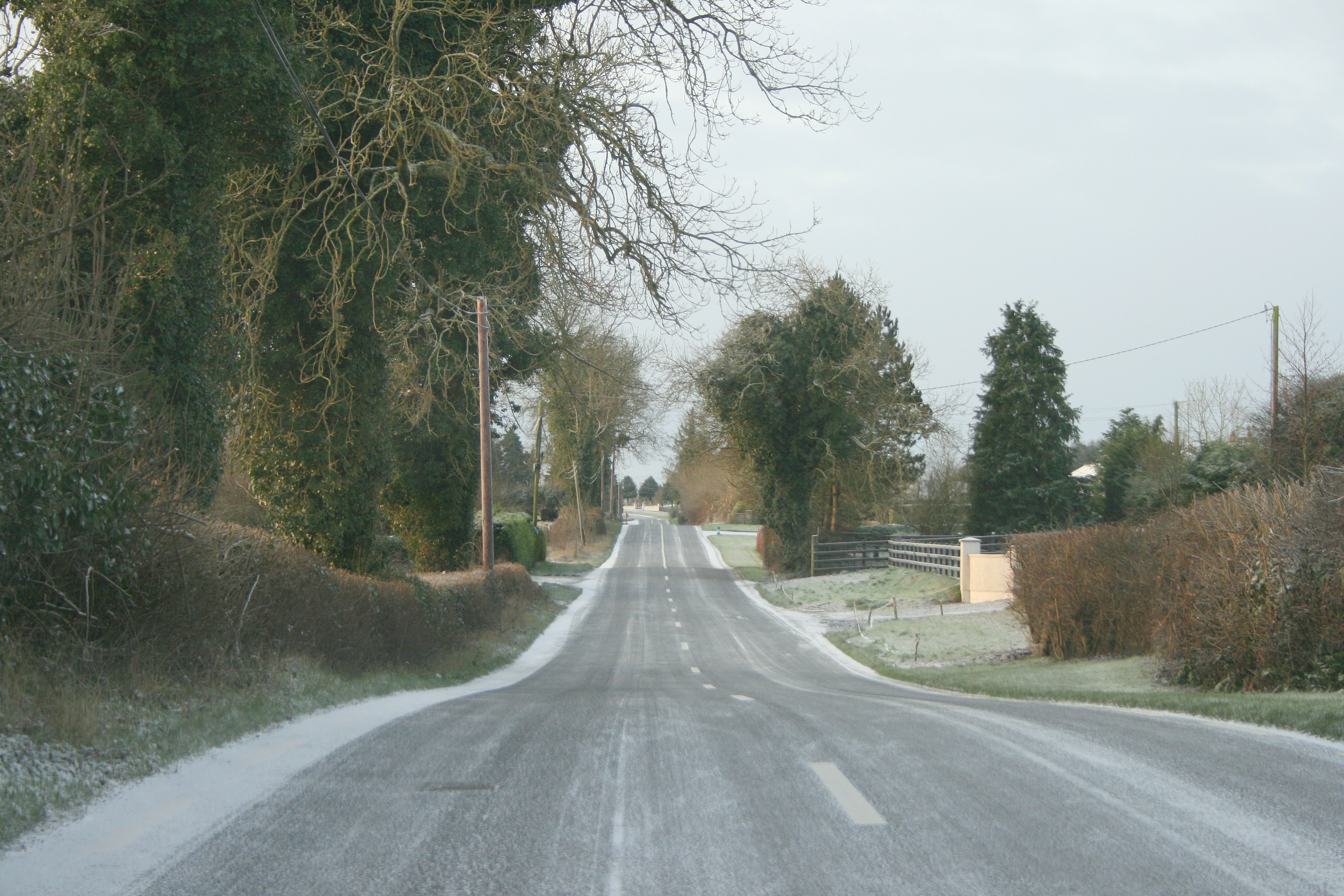
- The R391 passing through Dysart

- Location in Ireland
- Coordinates: 53°28′20″N 7°27′32″W
- Country: Ireland
- Province: Leinster
- County: County Westmeath
- Time zone: UTC+0 (WET)
  - Summer (DST): UTC-1 (IST (WEST))
- Irish Grid Reference: N503438

Dysart (Irish: An Díseart, meaning 'the hermitage') is a village in County Westmeath, Ireland. It is located on the R391 road, to the west of Mullingar. Lough Ennell is located to the east.

The town is located in the civil parish of the same name. A national school, two pubs and a 19th Century Catholic chapel are located in the centre of the village.

== See also ==
- List of towns and villages in Ireland
- Dysart (civil parish)
