= Rathconrath =

Village in County Westmeath, Ireland

Coordinates: 53°31′47″N 7°31′25″W

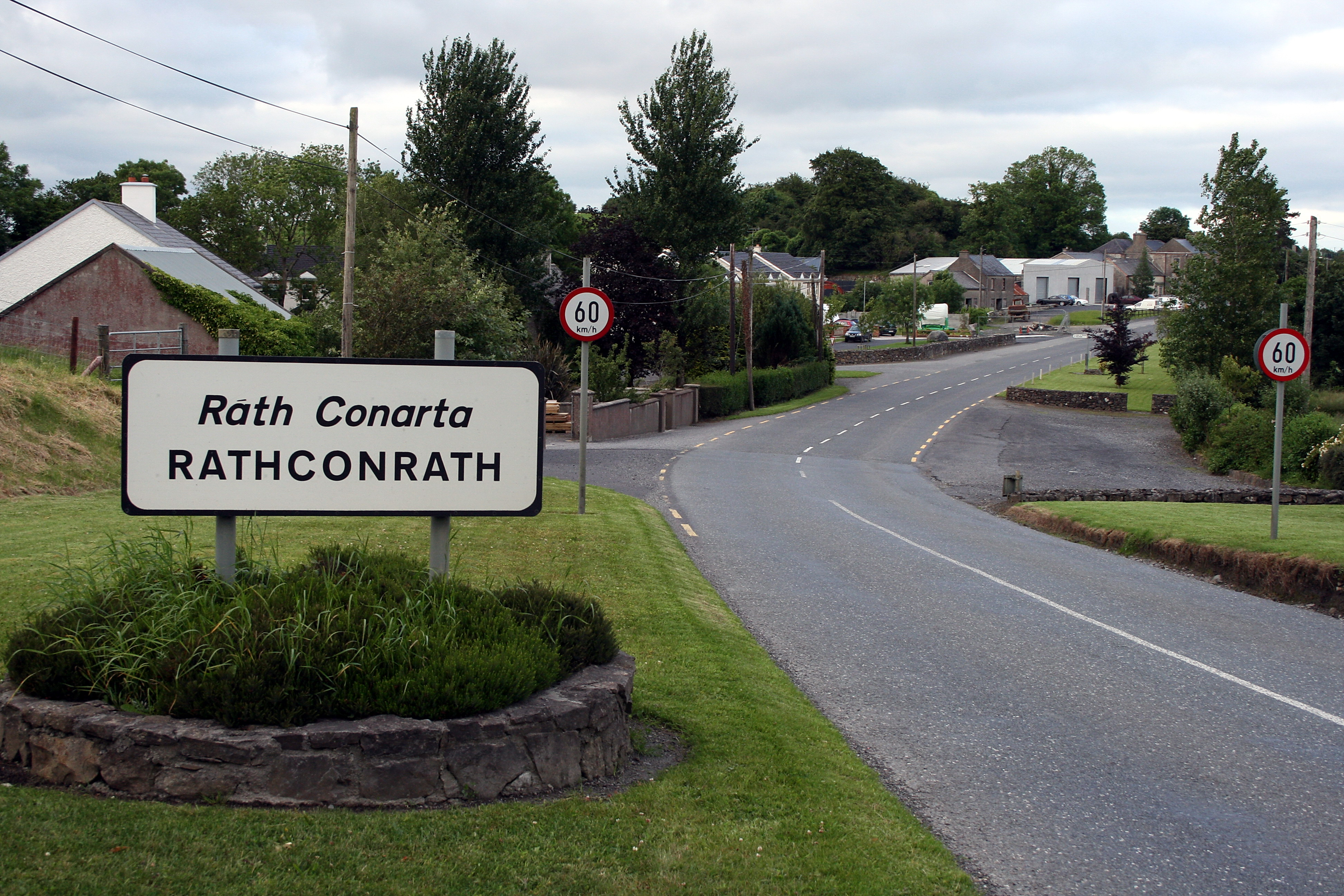
Rathconrath, approaching on the R392 from the West

Rathconrath (Irish: Ráth Conarta) is a village in County Westmeath, Ireland. It is situated on the R392 regional road 12 km (7.5 mi) west of Mullingar.

Rathconrath is also a civil parish and one of the baronies in Co. Westmeath, see list of baronies of Ireland.

== Public transport ==
Bus Éireann route 448 provides a link to Ballynacargy and Mullingar on Fridays only. The nearest railway station is Mullingar railway station.

== See also ==
- List of towns and villages in Ireland
