= R391 road (Ireland) =

Road in Ireland

R391 road
- Bóthar R391
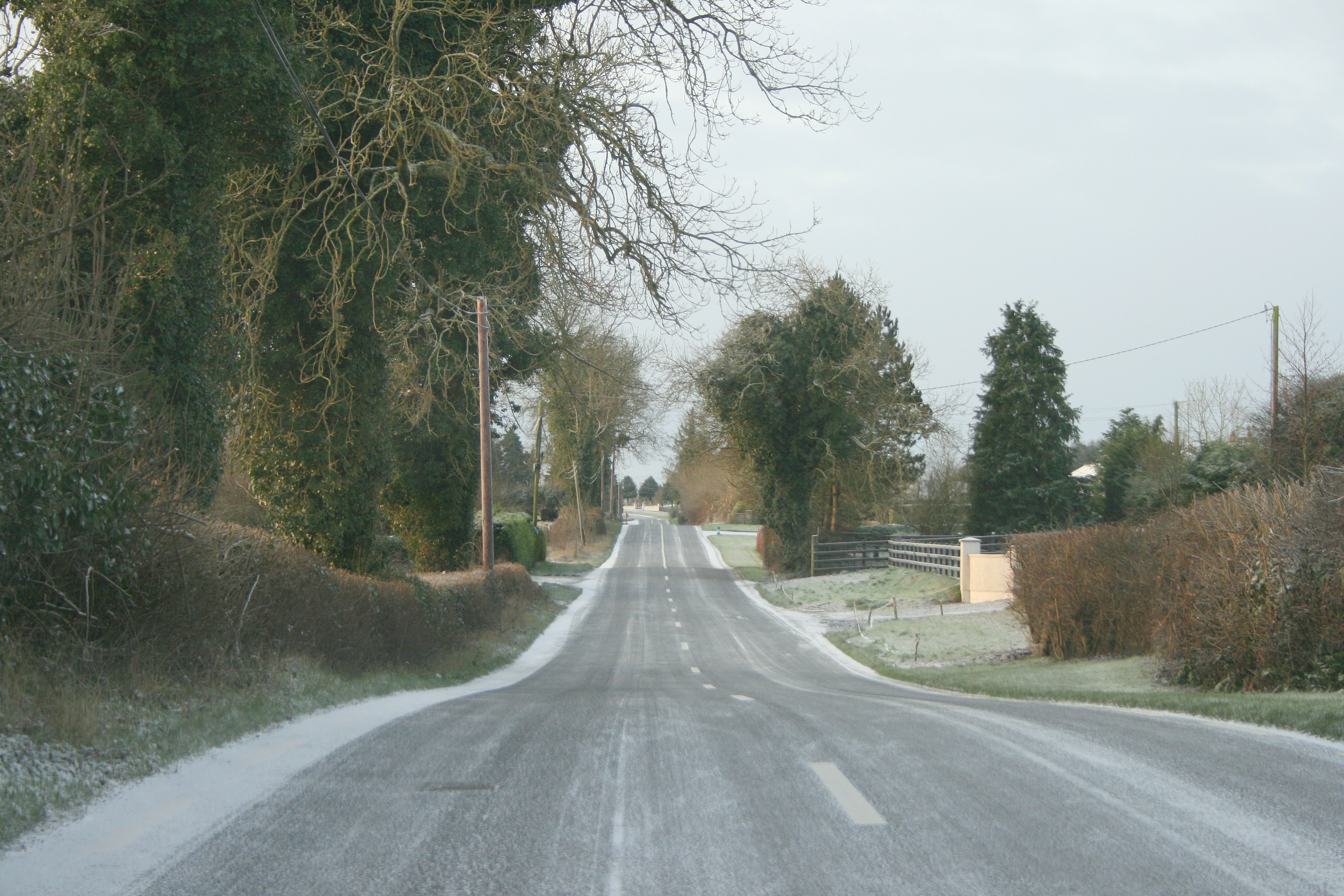
- R391 near Dysart

Route information
- Length: 23 km (14 mi)

Location
- Country: Ireland
- Primary destinations: County Offaly; Leaves the R436 near Clara; Crosses the M6 motorway; Horseleap joins/leaves the R446; County Westmeath; Spittaltown; (R389); Dysart; Hanstown; Terminates at junction with the R390 west of Mullingar

Highway system
- Roads in Ireland; Motorways; Primary; Secondary; Regional

The R391 road is a regional road in Ireland linking Clara, County Offaly to Mullingar, County Westmeath. It passes through the villages of Horseleap and Dysart and several hamlets before terminating west of Mullingar.

The road is 23 km (14 mi) long.

== See also ==
- Roads in Ireland
- National primary road
- National secondary road
