= R390 road (Ireland) =

Road in Ireland

R390 road
- Bóthar R390
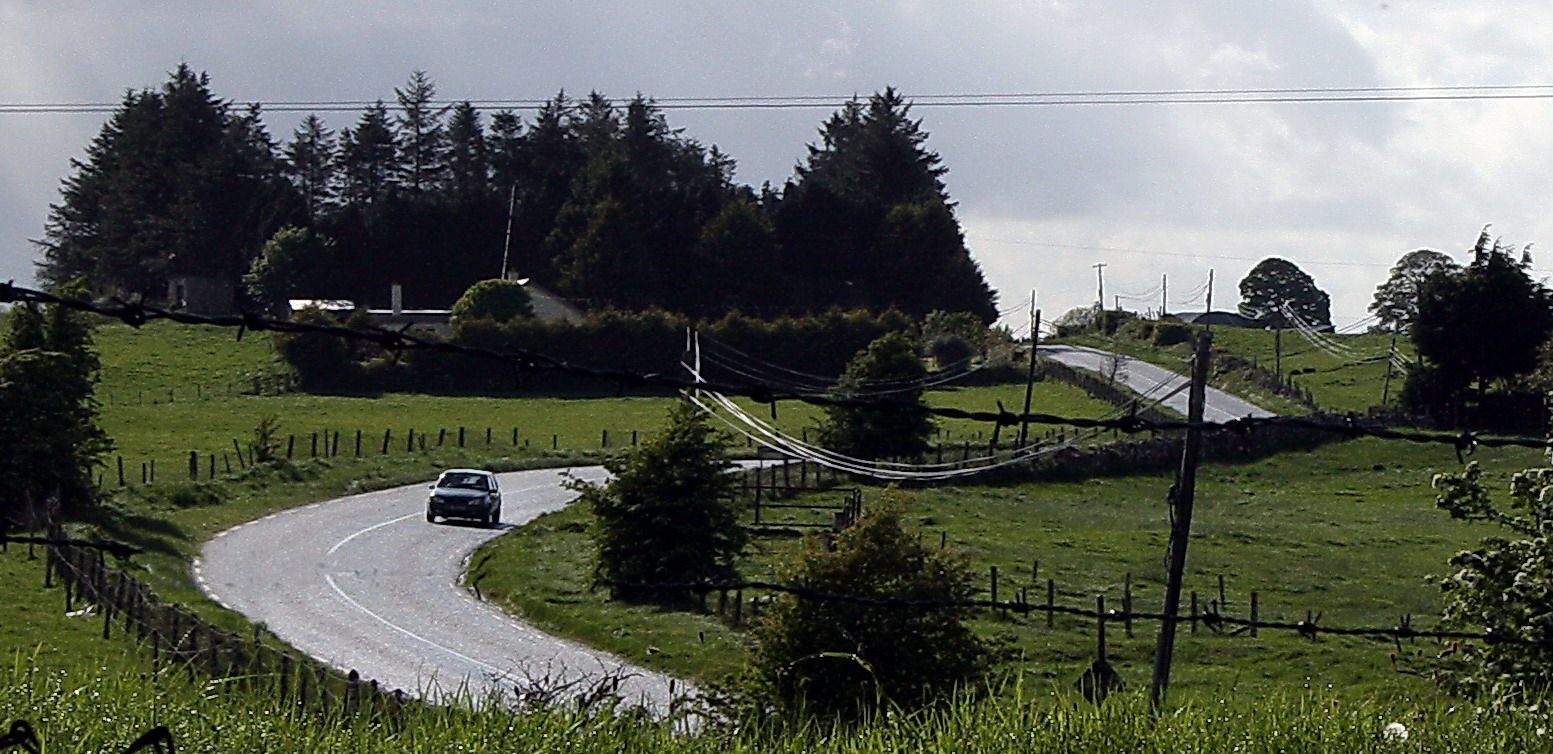
- R390 east of Ballymore

Route information
- Length: 43 km (27 mi)

Location
- Country: Ireland
- Primary destinations: County Westmeath; Athlone – leave the N55; Drumraney; Crosses the Tang River; Ballymore; Killane; Hill of Uisneach; Loughnavalley; Ballina, County Westmeath – Crosses the Royal Canal; (R392); Mullingar

Highway system
- Roads in Ireland; Motorways; Primary; Secondary; Regional

The R390 road is a regional road in Ireland linking Athlone to Mullingar, all of it within County Westmeath. It passes through the town of Ballymore, and several hamlets, before terminating in Mullingar. The road is 43 km (27 mi) long.

== See also ==
- Roads in Ireland
- National primary road
- National secondary road
