= R392 road (Ireland) =

Road in Ireland

R392 road
- Bóthar R392
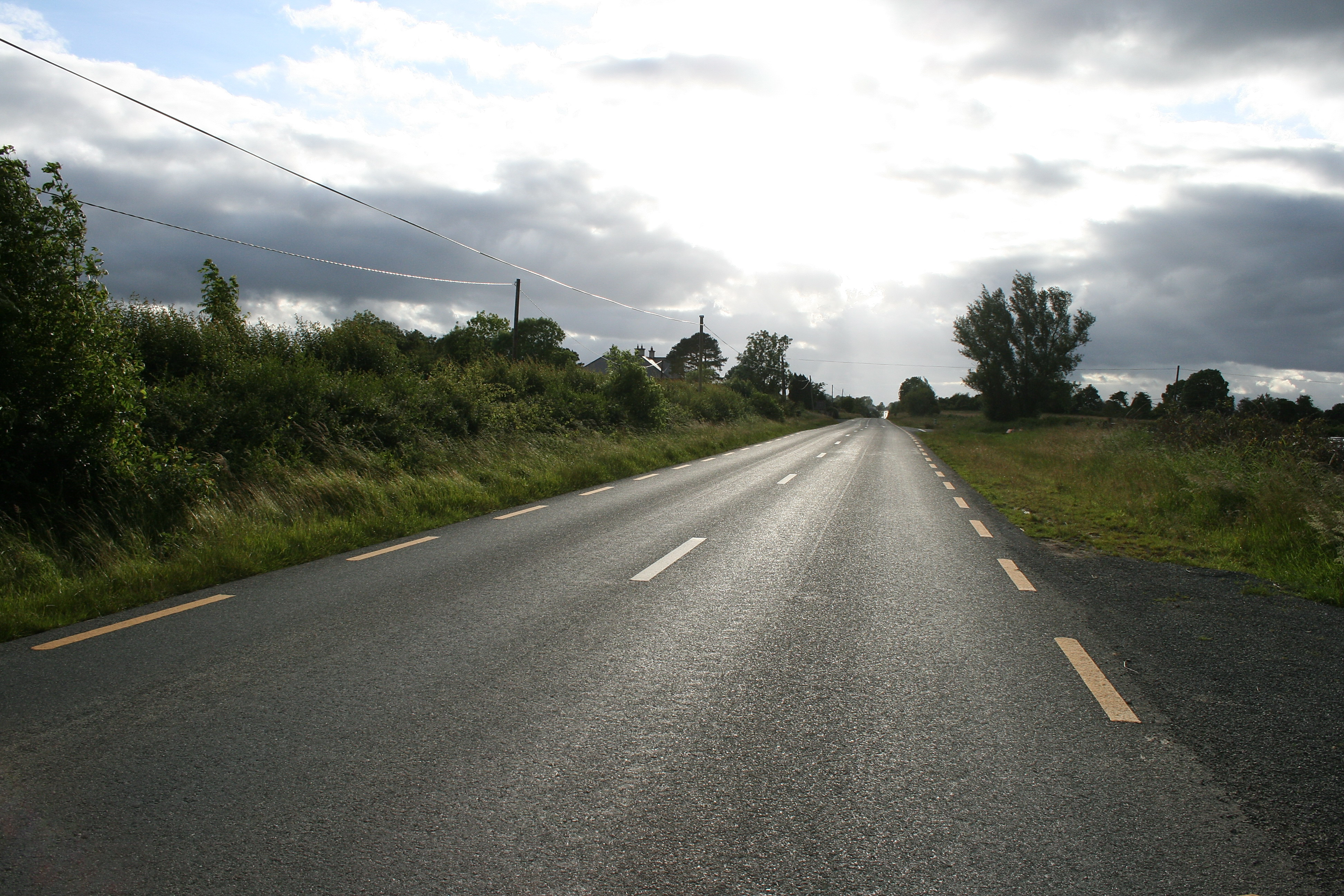
- Long straight sections are a feature of the R392

Route information
- Length: 47 km (29 mi)

Location
- Country: Ireland
- Primary destinations: County Longford; Lanesborough – starts at the N63; Derraghan Cross Roads – (R398); Corlea; Crosses the Royal Canal; (R397); Again crosses the Royal Canal; Ballymahon – joins the N55; crosses the River Inny, leaves the N55; County Westmeath; Moyvore; Skeagh Beg; Rathconrath; Crosses the Royal Canal; Mullingar – terminates at the R390

Highway system
- Roads in Ireland; Motorways; Primary; Secondary; Regional

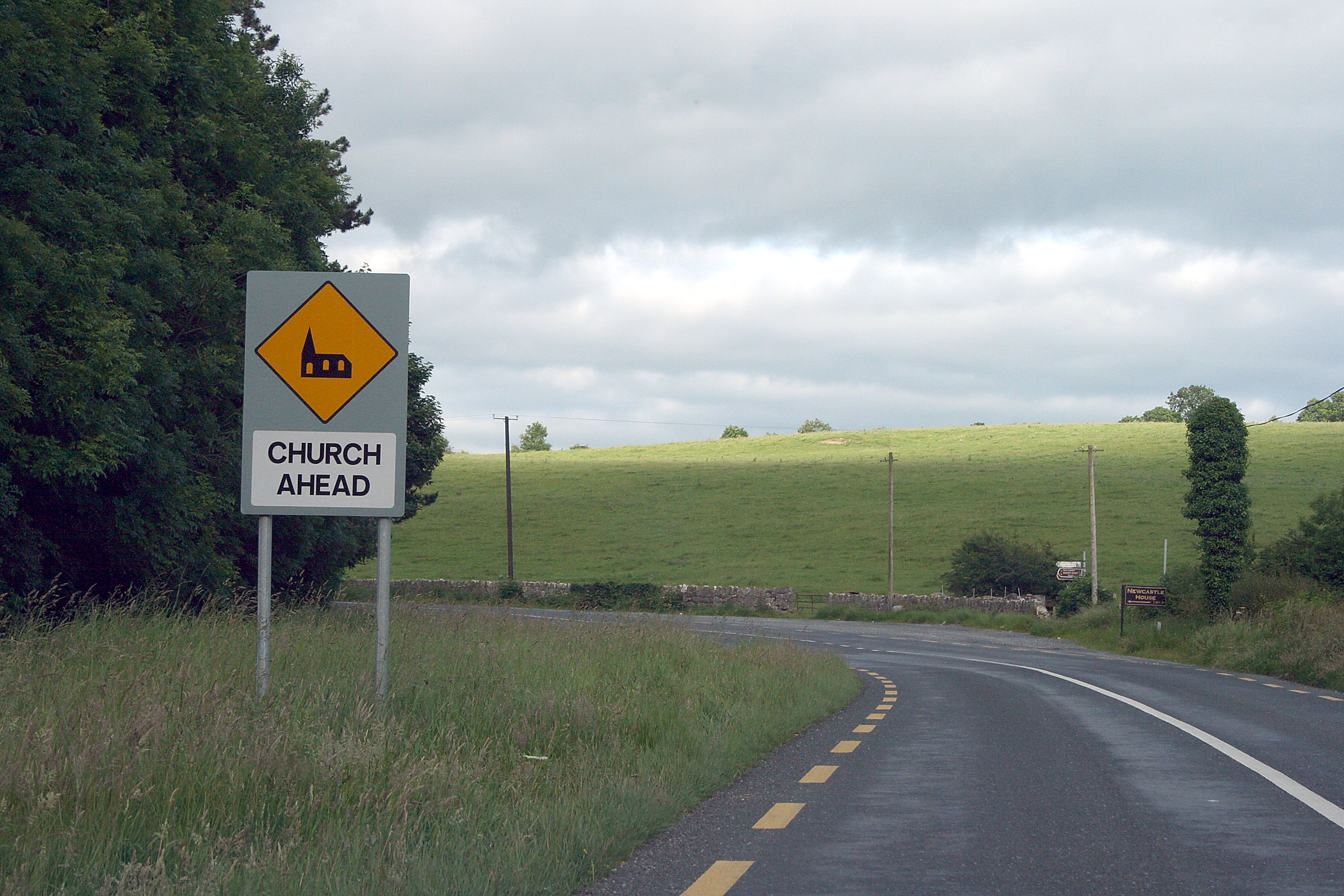
Hazardous Church ahead - on the R392 under the Hill of Forgney

The R392 road is a regional road in Ireland linking Lanesborough, County Longford on the N63 to Mullingar, County Westmeath.

Its route takes it in an arch (NW to SE) roughly west of the Royal Canal, which it crosses three times. The main town en route is Ballymahon, where it crosses the N55 and the River Inny.

The road is 47 km (29 mi) long.

== History ==
The R392 closely follows the route of a portion of an ancient ceremonial route known as the Slighe Assail, from Rathcroghan, in County Roscommon (the ancient capital of the kingdom of Connaught), to the Hill of Tara, in county Meath (the ancient capital of Ireland and residence of the High King of Ireland). As such it formed one of the legendary Five Roads of Tara. This largely accounts for the remarkable straightness of the R392 compared to other Regional roads in Ireland. The route also closely passes the Hill of Uisneach, an even older royal and spiritual site than Tara located between the villages of Moyvore and Loughnavalley and place of origin of the festival of Bealtine.

West of Ballymahon, before crossing the River Shannon, the R392 runs adjacent and parallel to the Corlea Trackway, an ancient wooden trackway across a peat bog found by Bord na Mona workers in the 1980s and excavated fully in 1991. This link with the Corlea Trackway indicates the R392 route to be one of the oldest routes in Ireland, possibly even in Europe.

== See also ==
- Roads in Ireland
- National primary road
- National secondary road
