= Séamas Ó Maoileoin =

Séamas Ó Maoileoin (19 December 1893 – 8 March 1959) was an Irish volunteer in the Irish Republican Army (IRA), and later an author. He was described as being one of Michael Collins’ most trusted agents.

== Early life ==
Malone was born in the village of Meedin, near Tyrrellspass, County Westmeath to William Malone, a farmer and schoolteacher Marie Mulavn. He had a sister, Mary and two brothers Joseph and Tomas, with whom he would fight alongside throughout the Irish War of Independence. Due to his grandfather's exile due to activities in the Irish Republican Brotherhood, his father was born in London.

He attended Rinn Dun Montessori School in Lecarrow, County Roscommon, before moving to the Christian Brothers school in Mullingar. He later gained a scholarship for Newbridge College. He studied Irish language extensively in Mullingar and also Spiddal, County Galway. He would later gain employment at the Armagh Christian Brothers school.

== Easter Rising ==
Malone left Armagh after realizing he was working against John Redmond. He became involved with the Irish Republican Brotherhood with his brother, taking part in both the Howth gun-running and Kilcoole gun-running missions. In 1914 he began working at a school in Portlaoise, whilst here he was asked by Liam Mellows to spy. The following year he had left this position and was working at a Jesuit School in Limerick. He was issued the order to return to Tyrellspass upon the outbreak of the Easter Rising in 1916. During the rising a shootout took place at the family homestead in Meedin. The Royal Irish Constabulary raided the home and reports of at least 3 shots being fired were reported during the week.

Due to his activities during the rising, he was arrested and spent captivity in both Limerick and Richmond Barracks before being sent to Wakefield and Frongoch. Upon release he was offered a position working under Conradh na Gaeilge in North Tipperary. Michael Collins ordered him to relocate to Cork under the alias ‘Liam Forde’ due to his popularity in Tipperary. His brother Tomas adopted the name 'Séan Forde'. Here he worked at the Christian Brothers school on Sullivan's Quay.

== Irish War of Independence ==
In December 1918 he was arrested along with his brother at Kilfinane. They were held in Athenry before escaping. During the Irish War of Independence, he headed the East Limerick Brigade of the Irish Republican Army. During the Irish Civil War, he opposed the Anglo-Irish treaty. He began teaching in a room in Tyrrellspass Castle, and even established a school named the Thomas Davis Secondary School, however the Department of Education refused to officially recognise the school.

== Later life ==
Following the war, he returned to teaching. He was teaching in Cork following the Second World War. In 1958 he wrote an autobiography titled 'B'fhiú an braon fola' (The drop of blood was worth it). At the end of his career, he was working as a teacher in Rathmines. Malone died on 8 March 1959 at Deansgrange, County Dublin he is buried at the Deans Grange Cemetery.

His family remains active in the Republican movement, with his nephew Seosamh Ó Maoileoin being the current president of Republican Sinn Féin.
