= Tomás Malone =

- Born: August 7, 1896; Meedin, County Westmeath, Ireland
- Died: 1981 (aged 84–85)
- Military career
- Allegiance: Irish Republican Army
- Service years: 1913-1923
- Rank: Volunteer
- Conflict: Irish War of Independence

Tomás Malone (1896-1981) was a volunteer in the Irish Republican Army (IRA), and later a schoolteacher. He was once described by Irish Free State Army general Richard Mulcahy as ‘the most dangerous man in Munster’.

== Early life ==
Malone was born in the village of Meedin, near Tyrrellspass, County Westmeath to William Malone and Marie Mulavin. He had two brothers, James and Joseph, and a sister Mary. He was baptized at the Meedin Parish Church on 7 August 1896. As a result of his grandfather's exile, owing to activities in the Irish Republican Brotherhood, his father was born in London.

He was educated at the Franciscan College, Multyfarnham where he studied Greek and Irish language. He was also a member of Fianna Éireann after Liam Mellows met with him following a Feis in Mullingar.

== Easter Rising ==
In 1913, a branch of the Irish Volunteers was formed in Tyrrellspass by Eoin Macneill and Tomás enlisted the same year.

During the 1916 Easter Rising, the Tyrrellspass brigade mobilized at Drumraney and marched to Horseleap to attempt to blow up a bridge. The attempt failed and the men retired to the Malone homestead. They fought off British forces from their family home from the Tuesday of Easter Week 1916 refusing to give up voluntarily, forced the British army to break into the house on Thursday May 4. Due to these activities, Malone was imprisoned at Richmond Barracks in Dublin before being transferred to Wandsworth prison in London. Finally he was sent to Frongoch internment camp in Wales. He was released in August 1916.

== Irish War of Independence ==
Following his release from Frongoch, Malone returned to Tyrrellspass. He followed his brother James, who was now using the Irish language translation of his name, Séamas to County Tipperary to work as a Conradh na Gaeilge organizer. During this time he also travelled to County Limerick under the instruction of Michael Collins to help organize volunteers.

Tomás adopted the alias Séan Forde during this time, as he was wanted for assaulting a police officer, his brother used Michael Forde. This name would be used throughout the duration of the war.

During the war, Tomas became Vice-Commandant of the East Limerick Brigade, helping to form a Flying column. Tomas was involved in a number of raids on local R.I.C barracks during this time.

In June 1920, British Major General Cuthbert Lucas was captured by the IRA and was held in Limerick, and Malone noted his involvement in his captivity. Tomas also participated in an attack on British forces near Limerick.

In late 1920, Malone was captured by Black and Tans in Cork due to being in possession of ammunition. He was sent to Union Quay Barracks where he was tortured. He admitted to being Tomás Malone and was court-martialled and sent to Cork Prison. After a number of failed escape attempts, he was sent to Spike Island, County Cork.

In 1922, a well documented escape from the Island took place. Malone alongside Seán MacSwiney and Con Twomey escaped on a boat flying a Union Flag, that was under the control of a group of IRA members. Malone returned to Limerick to resume activities.

Following the death of Michael Collins and the end of the Irish Civil War, Malone made another successful escape, this time from the Curragh Camp by hiding in a skip.

Malone resided in Nenagh, County Tipperary from 1923 until his death in 1981. He was principal of Nenagh Vocational School before retiring in 1960. Tomas remained a committed republican and in 1980 declared "I see no difference in the fight being waged against English domination of the country today and the fight we fought in Westmeath in 1916 and East-Limerick in 1920 and 1921. As far as I’m concerned, they are the same people at grips with the same enemy". Tomas received a republican funeral where two masked members of the IRA fired a volley of three shots in salute. Sinn Féin president Ruairí Ó Brádaigh gave the graveside oration.

== Family ==
Malone was the brother of Séamas Ó Maoileoin, and the uncle of Joseph Malone (Seosamh Ó Maoileoin), current president of Republican Sinn Féin. He resides in the family home at Meedin.
