= Des Dalton =

Irish political activist

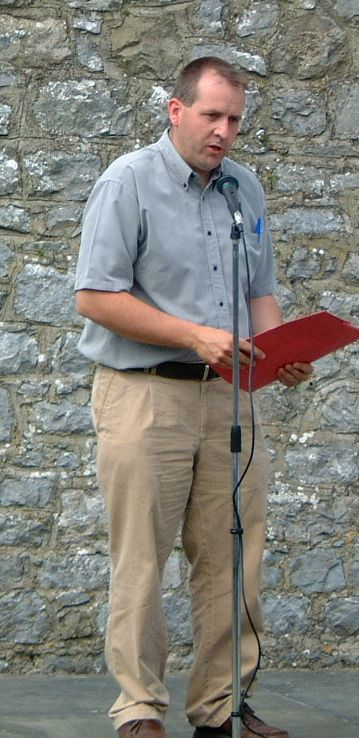
- Dalton speaking at Bodenstown

President of Republican Sinn Fein
- In office 2009–2018
- Preceded by: Ruairí Ó Brádaigh
- Succeeded by: Seosamh Ó Maoileoin

Personal details
- Party: Republican Sinn Fein (until 2021)

Des Dalton is an Irish political activist. He was the president of Republican Sinn Féin (RSF) from 2009 until 2018.

Previously a member of Ógra Fianna Fáil, Dalton later joined RSF and was a candidate for Athy Town Council in 2004. Dalton became president of RSF in 2009, succeeding his close friend Ruairí Ó Brádaigh. Dalton is a leading dissident republican, rejecting the Good Friday Agreement and opposing the Irish peace process. In 2010, Dalton said that the devolution of powers over the Police Service of Northern Ireland (PSNI) made no difference to dissident republicans; contended that the PSNI's function was "to uphold British rule"; and warned that Catholics and republicans who joined the PSNI were "putting themselves in the line of fire." In July 2011, Dalton spoke at a demonstration in Lurgan, County Armagh (attended by about 200 people) protesting the imprisonment of Martin Corey. The demonstration was peaceful, but illegal because it had not been approved by the Parades Commission. Dalton was subsequently arrested and charged. As president of the Continuity IRA-aligned RSF, Dalton rejected an overtures from the mainstream Sinn Féin for peace talks and Irish republican unity, saying, "Our position is that they are now an integral part of the machinery of British rule in Ireland and that consequently as Irish republicans we have nothing to say to them.

Dalton stepped down as RSF's president in 2018, but remained a member of the party's national executive. In March 2021, Dalton denounced violence as counterproductive, saying that violent acts (such as the 2019 killing of journalist Lyra McKee) turned the people against the cause of Irish republicanism. Dalton defended the legitimacy of "armed struggle" in principle, but expressed a personal view that a suspension of violence by the Continuity IRA, New IRA, and other factions would best promote dialogue toward Irish reunification and take advantage of "major opportunities opening up" in the wake of Brexit. Dalton pointed to previous IRA ceasefires in 1923 and 1962 as precedent for his stance. Dalton criticized the dissident Irish republican campaign as a series of "sporadic actions" rather than a true armed campaign, saying that it was morally unjustifiable and unhelpful politically. After expressing support for a ceasefire, Dalton was suspended from RSF; Dalton refused to accept the suspension, and instead resigned from RSF.

Dalton lives in County Kildare.
