= Seosamh Ó Maoileoin =

Irish politician

President of Republican Sinn Féin
- Incumbent
- Assumed office November 2018
- Preceded by: Des Dalton

Personal details
- Born: Meedin, County Westmeath, Ireland
- Party: Republican Sinn Fein

Seosamh Ó Maoileoin (born Joseph Malone) is an Irish Republican politician from Meedin, Tyrrellspass, County Westmeath. He has been the president of Republican Sinn Féin since November 2018 following the resignation of Des Dalton.

== Family ==
Seosamh is from a notable Republican family, his uncles Tomás and Séamas Ó Maoileoin participated in the Easter Rising, Irish War of Independence and the following Irish Civil War.
