= Meedin =

Village in County Westmeath, Ireland

Meedin Mídín Meedian
- Village
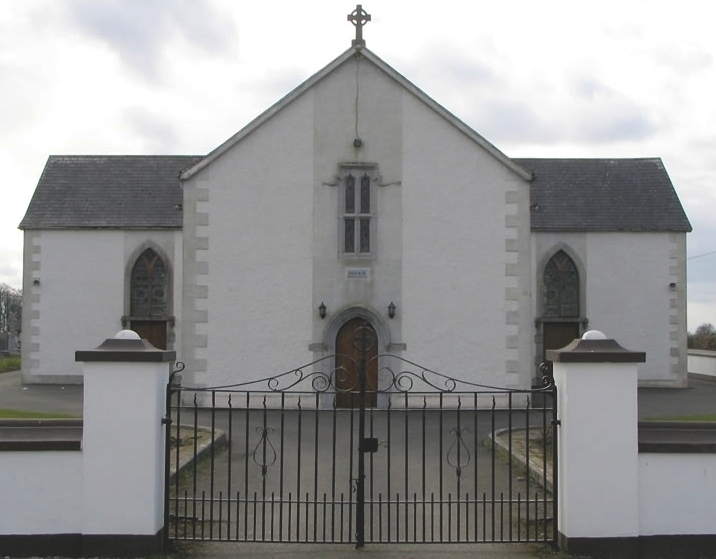
- Meedin Church

- Location in Ireland
- Coordinates: 53°24′36″N 7°22′12″W
- Country: Ireland
- Province: Leinster
- County: County Westmeath
- Time zone: UTC+0 (WET)
  - Summer (DST): UTC-1 (IST (WEST))
- Irish Grid Reference: N503438

Meedin (Irish: Mídín), also Meedian, is a village and townland in County Westmeath, Ireland. It is located in the south of the county on the N52 road, to the north of Tyrrellspass and Rochfortbridge and to the south of Mullingar.

The village contains a 19th-century church, dating back to 1831, dedicated to the Sacred Heart.

== People ==
- Tomás Malone, Irish War of Independence veteran
- Séamas Ó Maoileoin, Irish War of Independence veteran
- Seosamh Ó Maoileoin, president of Republican Sinn Fein
- Fr Timothy Shanley, Catholic priest

== See also ==
- List of towns and villages in Ireland
- Tyrrellspass
