= Timothy Shanley =

Irish Roman Catholic priest (1781-1835)

- Born: Timothy Shanley; 1781
- Died: 1835 (aged 53–54); Meedin, County Westmeath
- Education: St. Patrick's College, Maynooth
- Occupation: priest

Fr Timothy Shanley (1781–1835) was an Irish Roman Catholic priest notable for his opposition to British Crown authority, and to the Protestant Ascendancy, in the Kingdom of Ireland. He was active in the United Irish Rebellion of 1798.

== Early life ==
Shanley was born in Lisdessin near the village of Drumraney, County Westmeath in 1781. He was one of eighteen children.

He was educated at a seminary in Maynooth after taking part in an ambush near Tyrrellspass during the 1798 Rebellion. Shanley was the only student in the class who did not sign the required Oath of Allegiance due to his belief in the Irish cause. Due to his beliefs, he was often targeted by British soldiers.

== Priesthood ==
Fr Shanley was curate in Milltownpass and Meedin parish, he was then transferred to Slane, County Meath for ten years, before being transferred back to Meedin. He remained there till his death in 1835.

He is buried in Carrick, near Dalystown in County Westmeath. An annual mass is held at his gravesite on Good Friday.
