= Martin Corey =

Former member of the Provisional Irish Republican Army

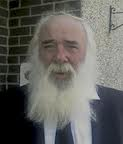
Martin Corey in 2012

Martin Corey (born c. 1950 at Lurgan) is an Irish republican convicted for Provisional Irish Republican Army killings during the Troubles and reimprisoned in 2010 for alleged dissident republican activity.

== Original conviction ==
On 27 February 1973, with Peter McVeigh and William Meehan, Corey ambushed members of the Royal Ulster Constabulary in Aghalee. One RUC officer, Constable Raymond Wylie, was killed instantly. Constable Robert McCauley died on 25 March 1973. In December 1973, Corey and his accomplices were found guilty of both murders and sentenced to life imprisonment. He was released on licence from the Maze Prison in June 1992.

From 1995, he worked as a gravedigger.

== Reimprisonment ==
Corey was taken back into custody on 16 April 2010, after the Secretary of State for Northern Ireland, Shaun Woodward, applied to the parole commission to have his release licence revoked, based on secret evidence linking Corey to dissident republicanism. Corey is a member of Republican Sinn Féin.

The parole commission proceeded to review the evidence at a closed hearing on 25 January 2011 at which a special advocate appointed by Advocate General for Northern Ireland represented Corey. Some evidence was withheld, with only the gist being made available to the advocate. The commission ruled on 15 August 2011 that it was "satisfied that Mr Corey had become involved in the Continuity Irish Republican Army from early 2005 and that he was in a position of leadership in that organisation from 2008 until his recall to prison".

The decision was subject to judicial review by Justice Treacy, who ruled on 9 July 2012 that the hearing's reliance on secret evidence violated Corey's right to due process. Treacy granted Corey bail pending a rehearing by the parole commission. The Secretary of State, Owen Paterson, obtained a stay on Treacy's judgment, appealing it to the Northern Ireland Court of Appeal. The Appeal court under Declan Morgan ruled that, whatever flaws might be in the parole commission's process, Justice Treacy did not have the authority to release Corey or grant him bail. In December 2013, the UK Supreme Court upheld the Appeal court decision.

=== Protests ===
Corey's continued detention in Maghaberry Prison was opposed by Sinn Féin and Republican Sinn Féin, and described as tantamount to internment. The Committee on the Administration of Justice proposed taking the case to the European Court of Human Rights. A website and social media campaign was launched. In May 2012, Corey was initially denied compassionate leave to attend the funeral mass for his brother. On appeal he was allowed to attend the church service, though not the burial, on condition that he be accompanied by Sinn Féin MLA John O'Dowd and lifelong friend and official spokesperson Jim McIlmurray from Lurgan.

In August 2012, the Prison Ombudsman determined that pieces of artwork confiscated from Corey by prison staff must be returned to him as they did not, as alleged, contain images that glorify terrorist activities.

== Release ==
On 15 January 2014, Corey was released from prison under licence. On the instructions of Secretary of State Theresa Villiers he was taken from the prison in a blacked-out van and released into the custody of his solicitor. "Rule 22" of the parole commissioners' rules prohibits publication of the conditions of such a licence; media reported they included bans on living within 20 miles of Lurgan, speaking to the media, or associating with known members of paramilitary group. His release was welcomed by Sinn Féin and the Social Democratic and Labour Party but criticised by Tom Elliott of the Ulster Unionist Party.
