= Cabhair =

Irish republican organisation

Cabhair ([koːɾʲ] or [ˈkaɯ̯ɪɾʲ]; lit. 'help, assistance') is an organisation which supports Continuity IRA prisoners.

The organisation was founded in early 1987 following the 1986 split in the republican movement in which Republican Sinn Féin and the Continuity IRA broke away from the Provisional IRA and Sinn Féin. It claims to be "solely dependent" on those who donate to it.

In March 2017 Cabhair and Republican Sinn Féin who have been described as the political wing of the Continuity IRA and the IRPWA became involved within a dispute. They accused the IRPWA of poaching for members after they "bullied" a prisoner supported by Cabhair and he refused to be a part of the IRPWA.
