= IRA ceasefire =

IRA ceasefire may refer to:

- In the Irish War of Independence, the truce of 11 July 1921
- In the Irish Civil War, the "Irregulars" (anti-Treaty IRA) ceasefire of 30 April 1923
- In the Border Campaign (Irish Republican Army), the cessation described in the IRA press release of 26 February 1962
- In the Northern Ireland Troubles:
  - Official Irish Republican Army, ceasefire of 30 May 1972
  - Chronology of Provisional Irish Republican Army actions (1970–1979), ceasefires of 1972 and 1975 (and other shorter intervals)
  - Chronology of Provisional Irish Republican Army actions (1992–1999), ceasefire of 1994–1996, and the final ceasefire of 19 July 1997
