= Tyrrellspass =

Village in County Westmeath, Ireland

Tyrrellspass Bealach an Tirialaigh (Irish)
- Village
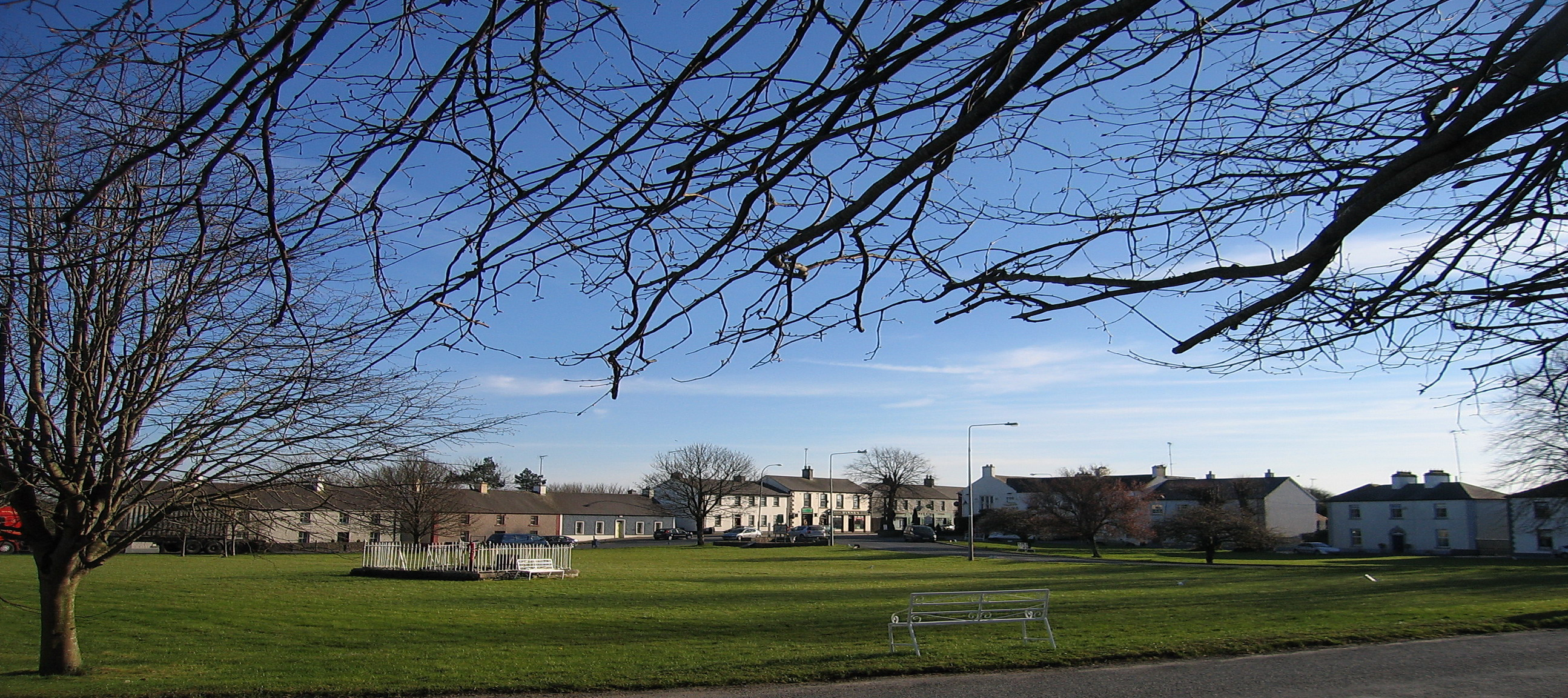
- The Village Green, Tyrrellspass

- Location in Ireland
- Coordinates: 53°23′20″N 7°22′38″W
- Country: Ireland
- Province: Leinster
- County: County Westmeath
- Elevation: 71 m (233 ft)

Population (2016)
  - Total: 483
- Time zone: UTC+0 (WET)
  - Summer (DST): UTC-1 (IST (WEST))
- Irish Grid Reference: N414377

Tyrrellspass (Irish: Bealach an Tirialaigh, IPA:[ˈbʲaləxˈanˠˈtʲɪɾʲiəliː]) is a Georgian village in County Westmeath, Ireland. It is 81 kilometres (50 mi) from Dublin, in the south of the county on the R446 (formerly the N6) road. Tyrrellspass won the Irish Tidy Towns Competition in 1969. As of the census in April 2016, the population of Tyrrellspass was 483.

== History ==
The origins of the village settlement lie in the Nine Years' War (1594-1603), also called Tyrone's Rebellion. In 1597 there was a battle in Tyrrellspass and the Irish, between 300 and 400 strong and led by Richard Tyrrell, attacked and defeated the English army. Out of 1,000 English troops only one survived. There is a historic castle on the edge of the town. It is the only remaining castle of the Tyrrells, who came to Ireland around the time of the Norman invasion.

The current core of the village is a planned estate village dating from the late 18th century, and was influenced by the English style of planned villages.

The village has a distinctive green and crescent of houses, including the Church of Ireland church and what was previously the court house, which was redeveloped c. 1820 under the patronage of Jane MacKey, Countess of Belvedere (d. 1836). The Catholic church, the Church of St. Stephen, is located across from Tyrrellspass Castle. The Church of Ireland church is St. Sinian's.

The Belvedere Protestant Children's Orphanage operated in Tyrellspass from 1842 until 1943.

During the 1916 Easter Rising, some rebels barricaded a house in Meedin, Tyrrellspass, with the intention of waiting for reinforcements and then attacking surrounding police barracks. Local legend has it that Michael Collins stayed in this house, the home of the Malones, who still occupy it. The RIC attempted to capture the house three times. Twice they were repelled with gunfire, before they eventually succeeded on the Wednesday after Easter week, and arrested the two remaining rebels, Thomas and Joseph Malone. They were the last two men captured under arms during the Rising.

== Sport ==
The local Gaelic football team, Tyrrellspass GAA, team won the Westmeath Senior Football Championship in 1999, 2006 and defended their title in 2007. In the 2007 Leinster Club Football Championship they progressed as far as the final, where they were beaten by the eventual All Ireland Club champions St. Vincents of Dublin.

The village also has a golf course, New Forest Golf Resort, which is located a mile outside the village. It is designed by golf course designer Peter McEvoy.

== Notable people ==
- James Daly, Connaught Rangers mutineer
- Ray Kelly, priest and singer
- Tomás Malone, Irish War of Independence veteran
- Seosamh Ó Mhaoileoin, president of Republican Sinn Fein

== Gallery ==
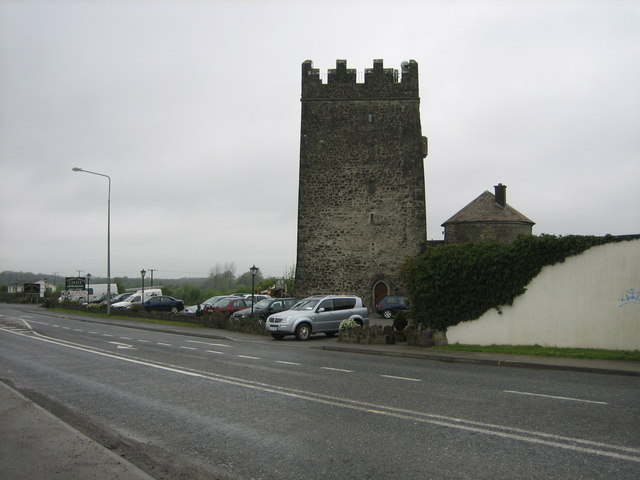
Tyrrellspass Castle

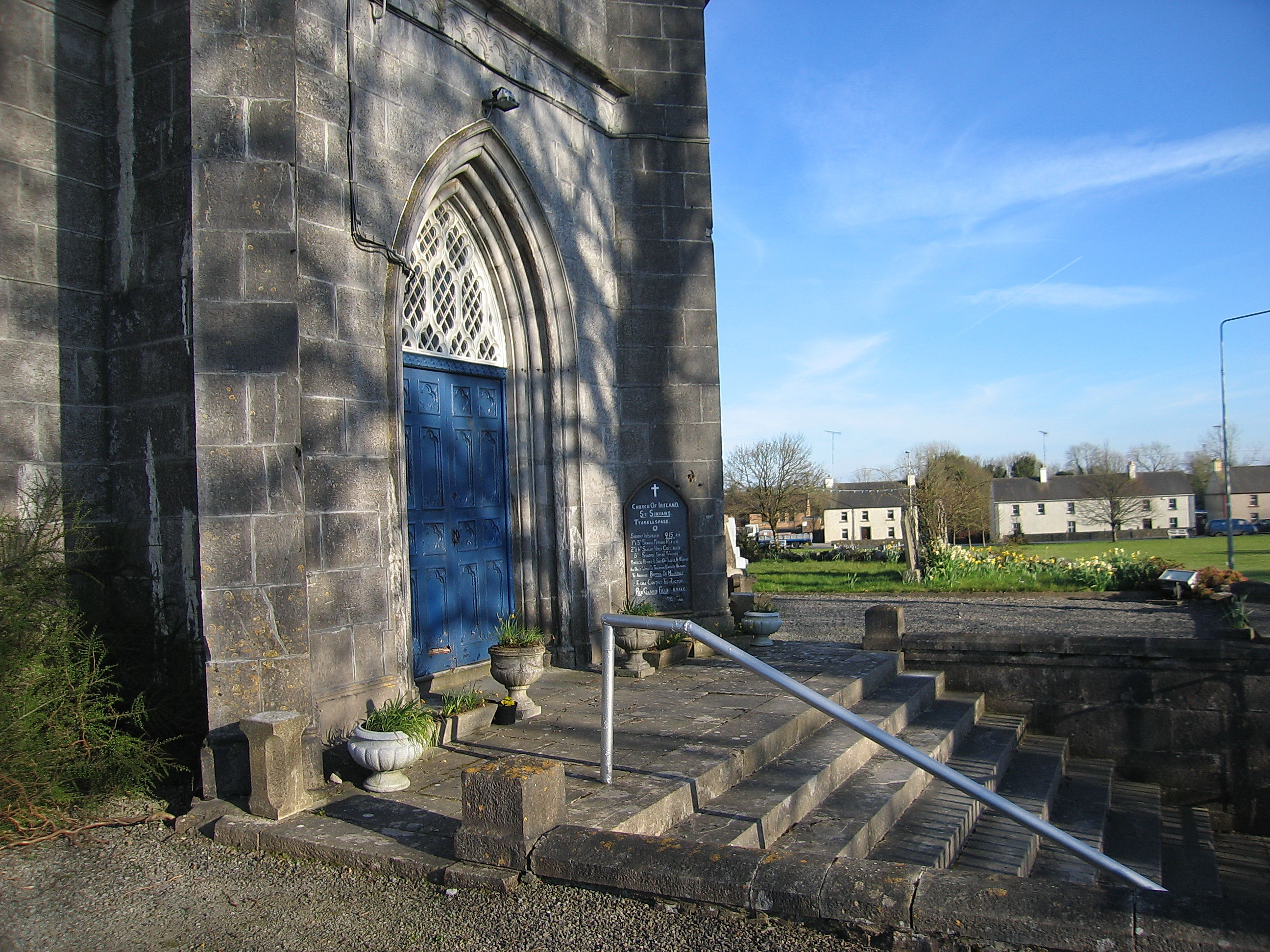
Church of St. Sinian, Tyrrellspass

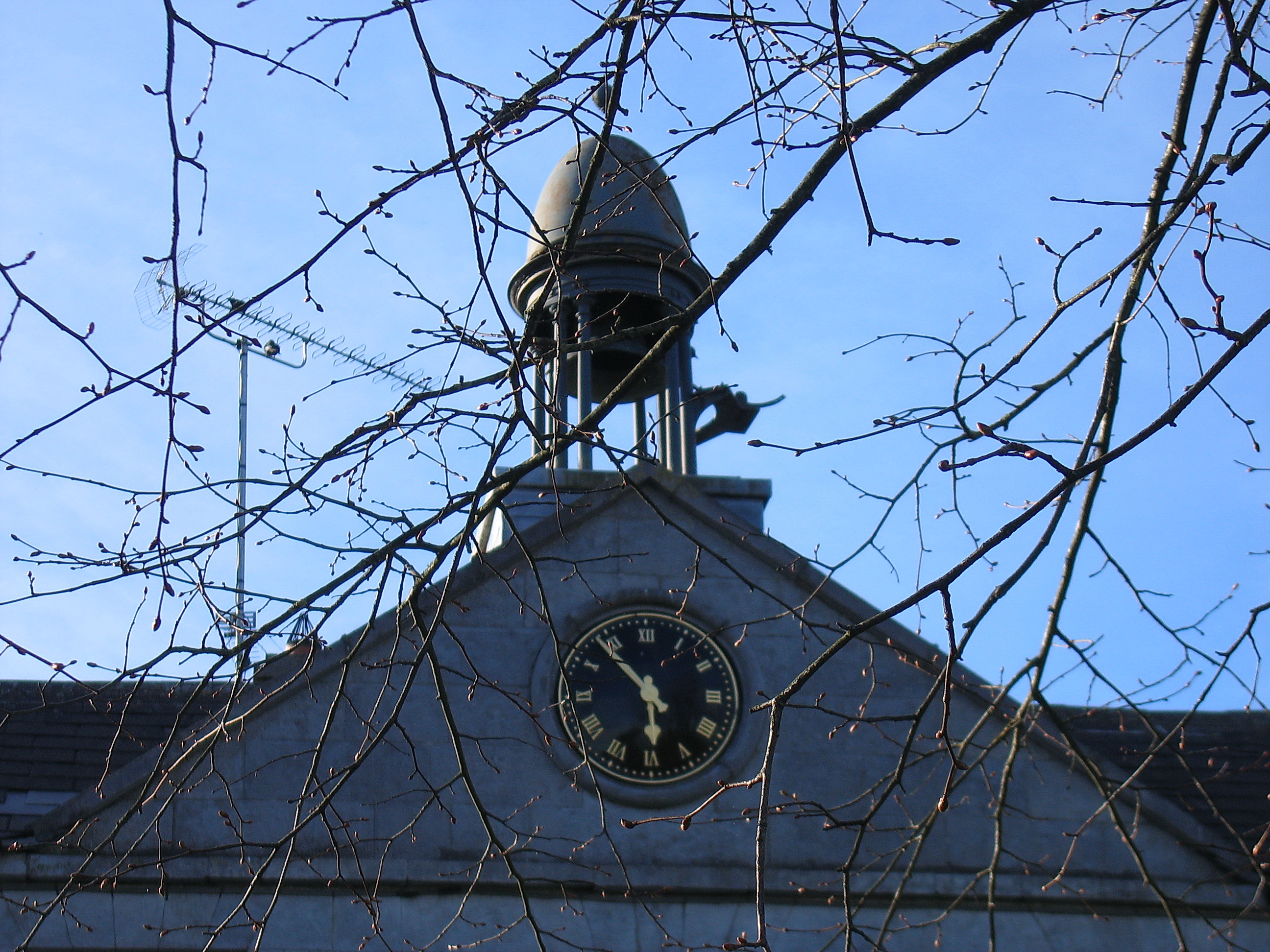
The Clockhouse

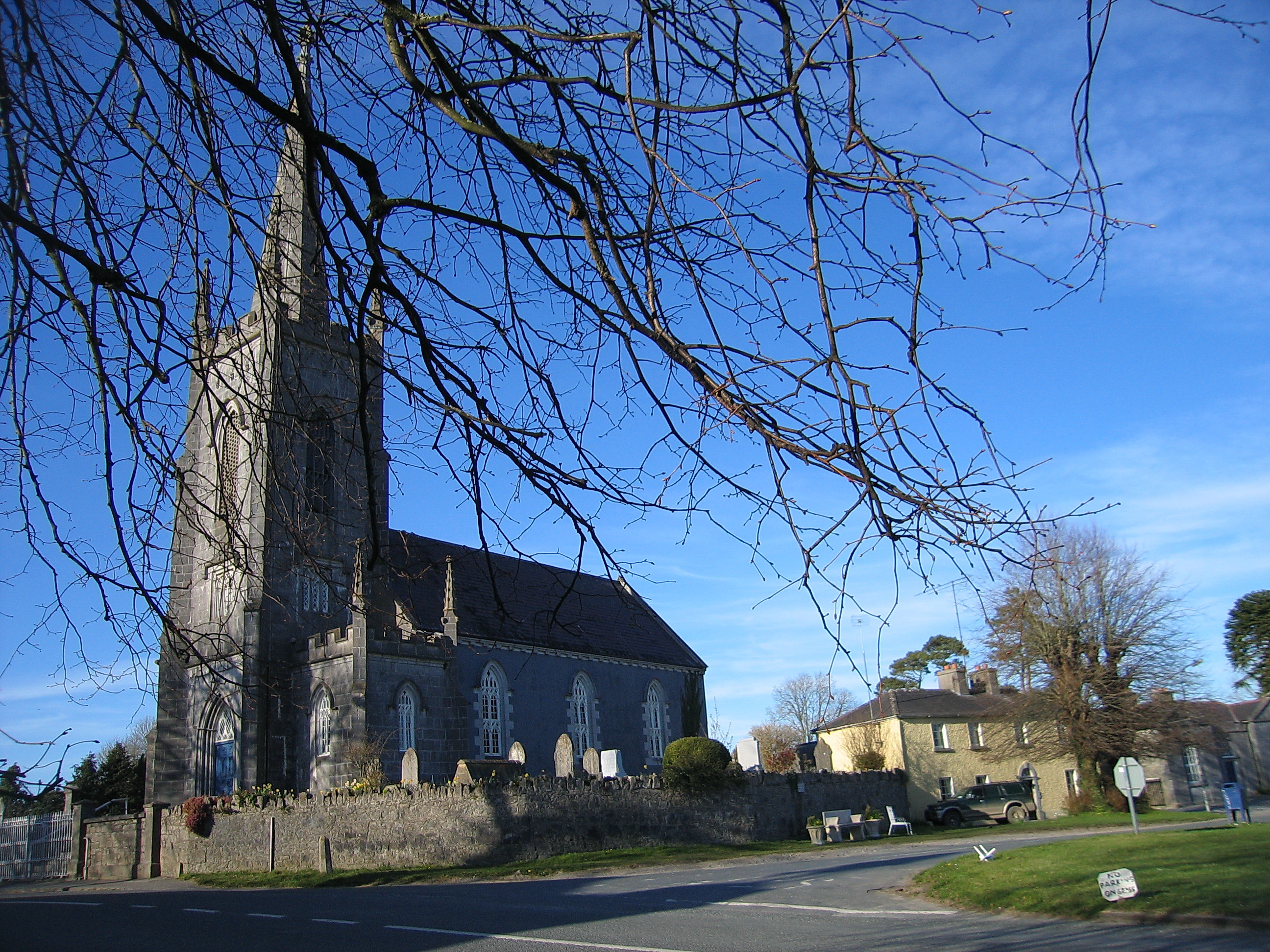
St Sinians

== See also ==
- List of towns and villages in Ireland
- Cloncrow Bog (New Forest)
