= Tyrrellspass Castle =

Castle in County Westmeath, Ireland

Coordinates: 53.386°N 7.381°W

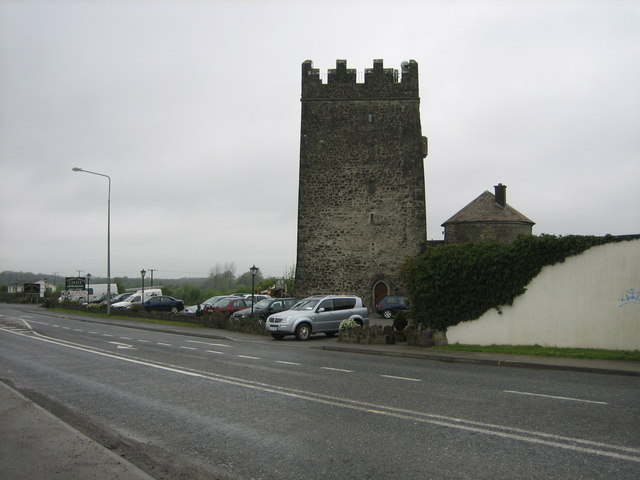
Tyrrellspass Castle

Tyrrellspass Castle is a medieval castle in Tyrrellspass, County Westmeath, Ireland. Dating back to circa 1411, it is the only remaining castle of the Tyrrells who came to Ireland around the time of the Norman Invasion.

== Architecture ==
The castle is approximately 20 metres high and follows the general pattern of tower houses: stone-built, essentially defensive and comprising a series of superimposed chambers. The original spiral staircase and one of the original roof beams dating from 1280 can still be seen today as an exposed beam in 'the lounge' restaurant. Alongside the entrance door is a murder-hole through which intruders could be attacked.

== History ==
Tyrrellspass is the modern name for Fartullagh, where in 1597 Captain Richard Tyrrell, a chief ally of Hugh O'Neill in the Nine Years' War, won a major victory against English crown forces in what has become known as the Battle of Tyrrellspass.

During the Cromwellian invasion of 1650, it is said the castle occupants suffered a great deal and many were executed. The castle and surrounding land was acquired soon after by the Rochfort family, who became the Earls of Belvedere. In 1796 the 2nd earl leased the castle to the army as a barracks. In 1850, ownership passed to Charles Brinsley Marlay, grandson of the 1st earl's only daughter, after whom it passed to Lieut.-Colonel Charles Howard-Bury, the explorer. He sold off the houses on the estate.

After a tumultuous history of intrusion, the castle was extensively restored by Mullingar architect Philip Ginnell in the 1970s and became his family residence.

== Today ==
During the early 1990s, the building was converted into a modern restaurant. Today it operates under the name Tyrrellspass Castle Restaurant. It also hosts medieval banquets.
