= Drumraney =

Village in County Westmeath, Ireland

Coordinates: 53.4817°N 7.7500°W

Drumraney (Irish: Droim Raithne) is a village in the County Westmeath, Ireland, just off the R390 regional road between Athlone and Mullingar. It is part of a small parish with a population of approximately 240 which includes the nearby village of Tang. It is approximately 12 km (7 mi) from Athlone. The village is in a townland of the same name.

== Amenities ==
It is home to a primary school, community centre, shops, post office, small businesses and to Maryland GAA and also to Drumraney Camogie Club which have both provided county players.

== Notable people ==
- Kieran Martin, Gaelic footballer
- Fr. Timothy Shanley (1781–1835)

== See also ==
- List of towns and villages in Ireland
