= Irish republicanism =

Political movement seeking independence in Ireland

Irish republicanism (Irish: poblachtánachas Éireannach) is the political movement which advocates the establishment of an Irish republic, void of any British rule. Throughout its centuries of existence, it has encompassed various tactics and identities, simultaneously elective and militant, and has been both widely supported and marginalized. One of its founding figures was Theobald Wolfe Tone (1763–1798).

The modern emergence of nationalism, democracy, and radicalism provided a basis for the movement, with groups forming across the island in hopes of independence. Parliamentary defeats provoked uprisings and armed campaigns, quashed by British forces. The Easter Rising, an attempted coup that took place in the midst of the First World War, provided popular support for the movement. An Irish republic was declared in 1916 and officialized following the Irish War of Independence. The Irish Civil War, beginning in 1922 and spurred by the partition of the island, then occurred.

Republican action, including armed campaigns, continued in the newly-formed state of Northern Ireland, a region of the United Kingdom. Tensions in the territory culminated in widespread conflict by 1969. This prompted paramilitaries: republicans assembled under the Provisional Irish Republican Army (PIRA), who waged a campaign against the British state for approximately three decades—the most pronounced and prolonged republican campaign. Represented by Sinn Féin, republicans would gradually invest in political action, including the Northern Ireland peace process and the Good Friday Agreement of 1998. The PIRA have since decommissioned and republicans have been elected to various echelons of government: those within the movement opposed to this outcome are often referred to as dissident republicans.

== History ==
=== Background of British rule in Ireland ===
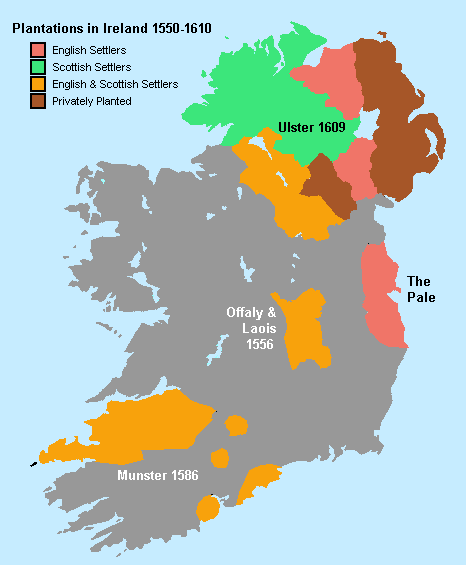
Map of Ireland in 1609 showing the major Plantations of Ireland

Following the Norman invasion of Ireland in the 12th century, Ireland, or parts of it, experienced alternating degrees of rule from England. While some of the native Gaelic population attempted to resist this occupation, a single, unified political goal did not exist amongst the independent lordships that existed throughout the island. The Tudor conquest of Ireland took place in the 16th century. This included the Plantations of Ireland, in which the lands held by Gaelic Irish clans and Hiberno-Norman dynasties were confiscated and given to Protestant settlers ("Planters") from England and Scotland. The Plantation of Ulster began in 1609, and the province was heavily colonised with English and Scottish settlers.

Campaigns against English presence on the island had occurred prior to the emergence of the Irish republican ideology. In the 1590s and early 1600s, resistance was led by Hugh O'Neill (see the Nine Years' War). The Irish chieftains were ultimately defeated, leading to their exile (the 'Flight of the Earls') and the aforementioned Plantation of Ulster in 1609.

=== 1627 Hispano-Irish proposal ===
In Europe, prior to the 18th and 19th centuries, republics were in a minority and monarchy was the norm, with few long-lasting republics of note at time, such as the fully-fledged Dutch Republic and the Republic of Venice, as well as the Old Swiss Confederacy and the Polish–Lithuanian Commonwealth, which had republican aspects. However, as noted by Cardinal Tomás Ó Fiaich, the first ever document proposing a republic of Ireland independent from connections to England dates from 1627. Summaries of these plans are held in the Archives générales du Royaume in Belgium and were made familiar to Irish historians by the work of Fr. Brendan Jennings, a Franciscan historian, with his work Wild Geese in Spanish Flanders, 1582–1700 (1964).

This early republican spirit was not ecumenical and was formed by exiled Irish Catholic Gaels with the support of Habsburg Spain as part of the Irish military diaspora who had fled into Spanish service in the aftermath of the Flight of the Earls during the Thirty Years' War. This was in the context of the break-down of the Spanish match and the onset of the Anglo-Spanish War of 1625–1630. Proposals were made at Madrid, with the involvement of Archbishop Florence Conry and Owen Roe O'Neill, for the Irish Regiment in the Spanish Netherlands then in the service of the Infanta Isabella Clara Eugenia, to invade and reconquer the English-controlled Kingdom of Ireland and set up an Irish government loosely aligned with the Habsburg Empire.

Arms of 1627 proposed "Captains General of the Republic"

Arms of the Ó Néill

Arms of the Ó Domhnaill

One of the main problems was that within the leadership of the Hispano-Irish diaspora, there were rivalries and factionalism between two primary contenders, Shane O'Neill and Hugh O'Donnell, over who should be the overall leader and thus have rights to an Irish throne if the project was a success. A third option was to resolve the conflict between the two factions before an invasion by making them family, with a marriage proposed between Hugh O'Donnell's sister Mary Stuart O'Donnell and Shane O'Neill, but this broke down. Ministers in Madrid, to Philip IV of Spain, instead drew up proposals on 27 December 1627 for a "Kingdom and Republic of Ireland" and that "the earls should be called Captains General of the said Republic and one could exercise his office on land and the other at sea." These proposals were approved by Philip IV and forwarded to Infanta Isabella Clara Eugenia in Brussels. As the Anglo-Spanish War became more tepid, the plans were never put into practice.

A decade later, the Irish Rebellion of 1641 began. This consisted of a coalition between the Irish Gaels and the Old English (descendants of the Anglo-Norman settlers who settled during the Norman Invasion) rebelling against the English rulers. While some ideas from the 1627 proposals were carried on, the attempt to rally both Gaels and Old English to the banner, mean't trying to find common ground and one of these concessions was support for the Stuart monarchy under Charles I of England whom the Old English were strongly attached to. The motto of the Confederation would thus become Pro Deo, pro Rege et Patria, Hibernia unanimis ('Irishmen United for God, King and Country'), with any idea of a republic ditched. Beginning as a coup d'état with the aim of restoring lost lands in the north of Ireland and defending Catholic religious and property rights, (which had been suppressed by the Puritan Parliament of England) it evolved into the Irish Confederate Wars. In the summer of 1642, the Catholic upper classes formed the Catholic Confederation, which essentially became the de facto government of Ireland for a brief period until 1649, when the forces of the English Parliament carried out the Cromwellian conquest of Ireland and the old Catholic landowners were permanently dispossessed of their lands. The most explicit Irish separatist viewpoint from the period, found in Disputatio Apologetica, written in Lisbon in 1645 by Fr. Conor O'Mahony, a Jesuit priest from Munster, argued instead for a Gaelic monarchy to be set up in an explicitly Catholic Ireland, with no mention of a republic.

=== Society of United Irishmen and the Irish Rebellion of 1798 ===
The origin of modern Irish republicanism exists in the ideology and action of the United Irishmen. Founded in 1791 and informed by the Enlightenment, popular sovereignty and the likes of John Locke and Thomas Paine, they initially propagated parliamentary reform and Catholic emancipation. Degradation in the legal achievement of these outcomes, coupled with the burgeoning perception of England as a foreign conqueror, inspired revolutionary sentiment and eventual action.

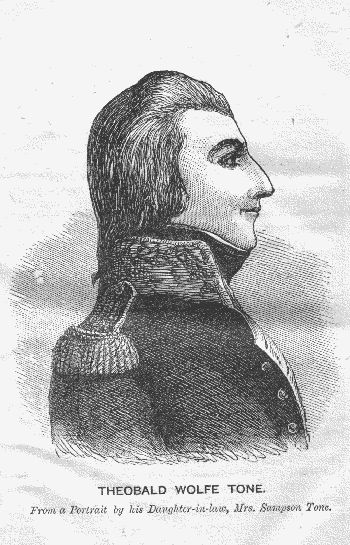
Wolfe Tone circa 1794. Tone is considered by many as the father of Irish Republicanism

At this stage, the movement was led primarily by liberal Protestants, particularly Presbyterians from the province of Ulster. The founding members of the United Irishmen were mainly Southern Irish Protestant aristocrats. The key founders included Wolfe Tone, Thomas Russell, Henry Joy McCracken, James Napper Tandy, and Samuel Neilson. By 1797, the Society of United Irishmen had around 100,000 members. Crossing the religious divide in Ireland, it had a mixed membership of Catholics, Presbyterians, and even Anglicans from the Protestant Ascendancy. It also attracted support and membership from Catholic agrarian resistance groups, such as the Defenders organisation, who were eventually incorporated into the Society. The Society sought to unite the denominations of the island under the simple distinction of Irish.

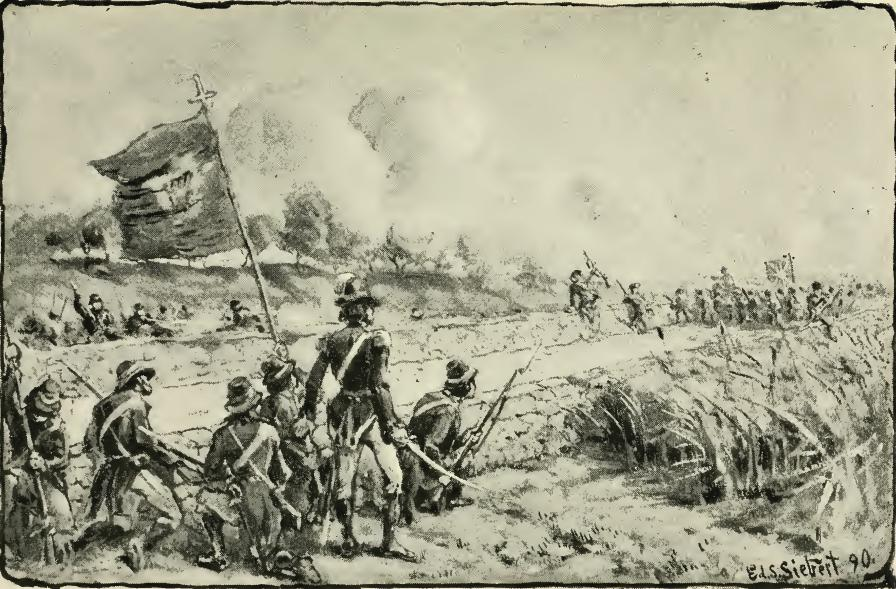
The Battle of Killala marked the end of the rising

The Irish Rebellion of 1798 began on 23 May, with the first clashes taking place in County Kildare on 24 May, before spreading throughout Leinster, as well as County Antrim and other areas of the country. French soldiers landed in Killala on 22 August and participated in the fighting on the rebels' side. Even though they had considerable success against British forces in County Wexford, rebel forces were eventually defeated. Key figures in the organisation were arrested and executed.

=== Acts of Union ===
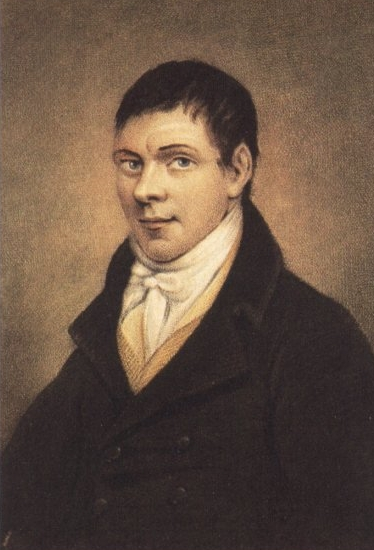
Michael Dwyer

Though the Rebellion of 1798 was eventually put down, small republican guerrilla campaigns against the British Army continued for a short time afterward in the Wicklow Mountains under the leadership of Michael Dwyer and Joseph Holt, involving attacks on small parties of yeomen. These activities were perceived by some to be merely "the dying echoes of an old convulsion", but others feared further large-scale uprisings, due to the United Irishmen continuing to attract large numbers of Catholics in rural areas of the country and arms raids being carried out on a nightly basis. It was also feared that rebels would again seek military aid from French troops, and another rising was expected take place by 10 April.

This perceived threat of further rebellion resulted in the Parliamentary Union between the Kingdom of Great Britain and Ireland. After some uncertainty, the Irish Parliament voted to abolish itself in the Acts of Union 1800, forming the United Kingdom of Great Britain and Ireland, by a vote of 158 to 115. A number of tactics were used to achieve this end. Lord Castlereagh and Charles Cornwallis were known to use bribery extensively. In all, a total of sixteen Irish borough-owners were granted British peerages. A further twenty-eight new Irish peerages were created, while twenty existing Irish peerages increased in rank.

Furthermore, the government of Great Britain sought to replace Irish politicians in the Irish parliament with pro-Union politicians, and rewards were granted to those that vacated their seats, with the result being that in the eighteen months prior to the decision in 1800, one-fifth of the Irish House of Commons changed its representation due to these activities and other factors such as death. It was also promised by Prime Minister William Pitt the Younger that he would bring about Catholic emancipation, though after the Acts of Union were successfully voted through, King George III saw that this pledge was never realised, and as such Catholics were not granted the rights that had been promised prior to the Acts.

=== Robert Emmet ===
A second attempt at forming an independent Irish republic occurred under Robert Emmet in 1803. Emmet had previously been expelled from Trinity College, Dublin for his political views. Like those who had led the 1798 rebellion, Emmet was a member of the United Irishmen, as was his brother Thomas Addis Emmet, who had been imprisoned for membership in the organisation.

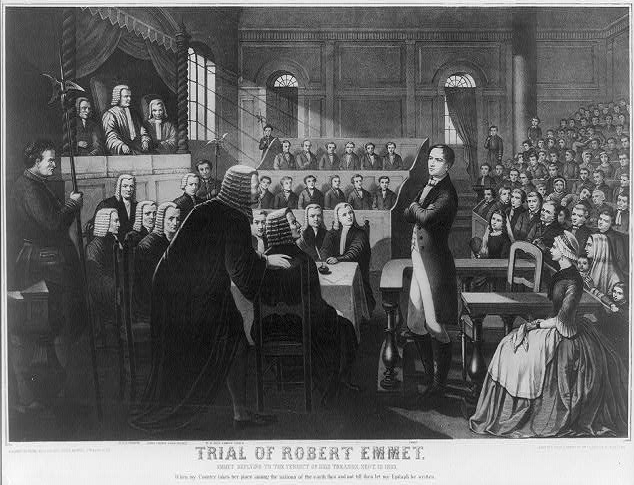
Depiction of Robert Emmet's trial

Emmet and his followers had planned to seize Dublin Castle by force, manufacturing weaponry and explosives at a number of locations in Dublin. Unlike those of 1798, preparations for the uprising were successfully concealed from the government and law enforcement, and though a premature explosion at an arms depot attracted the attention of police, they were unaware of the United Irishmen activities at the time and did not have any information regarding the planned rebellion. Emmet had hoped to avoid the complications of the previous rebellion and chose not to organise the county outside of Dublin to a large extent. It was expected that the areas surrounding Dublin were sufficiently prepared for an uprising should one be announced, and Thomas Russell had been sent to northern areas of the country to prepare republicans there.

A proclamation of independence, addressed from 'The Provisional Government' to 'The People of Ireland' was produced by Emmet, echoing the republican sentiments expressed during the previous rebellion:

You are now called on to show to the world that you are competent to take your place among nations, that you have a right to claim their recognisance of you, as an independent country ... We therefore solemnly declare, that our object is to establish a free and independent republic in Ireland: that the pursuit of this object we will relinquish only with our lives ... We war against no religious sect ... We war against English dominion.

— Robert Emmet, Proclamation of the Provisional Government

However, failed communications and arrangements produced a considerably smaller force than had been anticipated. Nonetheless, the rebellion began in Dublin on the evening of 23 July. Emmet's forces were unable to take Dublin Castle, and the rising broke down into rioting, which ensued sporadically throughout the night. Emmet escaped and hid for some time in the Wicklow Mountains and Harold's Cross, but was captured on 25 August and hanged on 20 September 1803, at which point the Society of United Irishmen was effectively finished.

=== Young Ireland and the Irish Confederation ===
The Young Ireland movement began in the late 1830s. The term 'Young Ireland' was originally a derogatory one, coined by the press in Britain to describe members of the Repeal Association (a group campaigning for the repeal of the Acts of Union 1800 which joined the Kingdom of Ireland and the Kingdom of Great Britain) who were involved with the Irish nationalist newspaper The Nation. Encouraging the repeal of the Acts of Union, members of the Young Ireland movement advocated the removal of British authority from Ireland and the re-establishment of the Irish Parliament in Dublin. The group had cultural aims also, and encouraged the study of Irish history and the revival of the Irish language. Influential Young Irelanders included Charles Gavan Duffy, Thomas Davis and John Blake Dillon, the three founders of The Nation.

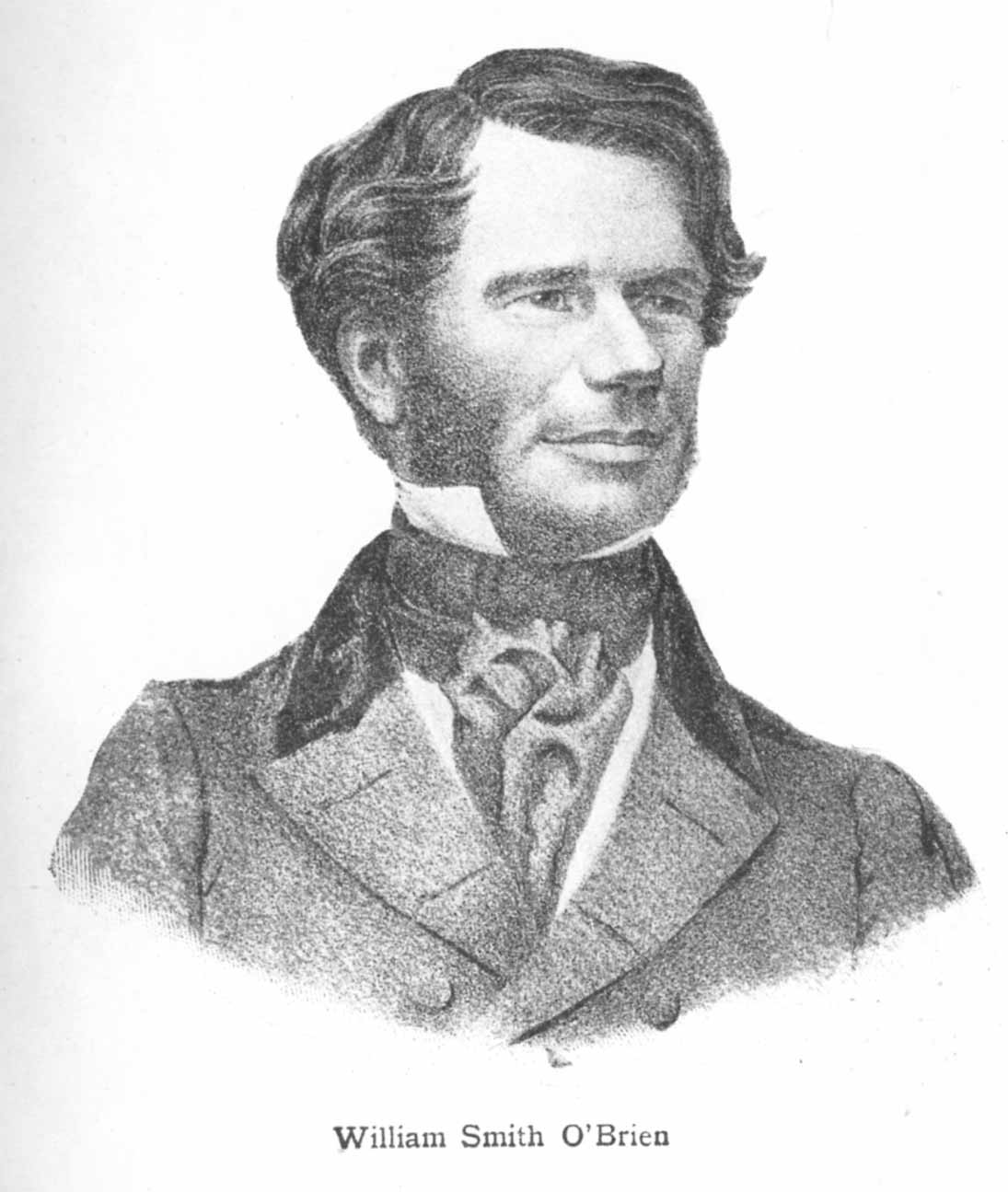
William Smith O'Brien, leader of the Young Ireland movement

The Young Irelanders eventually seceded from the Repeal Association. The leader of the Repeal Association, Daniel O'Connell, opposed the use of physical force to enact repeal, and passed 'peace resolutions' declaring that violence and force were not to be employed. Though the Young Irelanders did not support the use of violence, the writers of The Nation maintained that the introduction of these peace resolutions was poorly timed, and that to declare outright that physical force would never be used was 'to deliver themselves bound hand and foot to the Whigs.' William Smith O'Brien, who had previously worked to achieve compromise between O'Connell and The Nation group, was also concerned, and claimed that he feared these resolutions were an attempt to exclude the Young Irelanders from the Association altogether. At an Association meeting held in July 1846 at Conciliation Hall, the meeting place of the Association, Thomas Francis Meagher, a Young Irelander, addressing the peace resolutions, delivered his 'Sword Speech', in which he stated, "I do not abhor the use of arms in the vindication of national rights ... Be it for the defence, or be it for the assertion of a nation's liberty, I look upon the sword as a sacred weapon." John O'Connell, Daniel O'Connell's son, was present at the proceedings and interrupted Meagher's speech, claiming that Meagher could no longer be part of the same association as O'Connell and his supporters. After some protest, the Young Irelanders left Conciliation Hall and the Repeal Association forever, founding the Irish Confederation 13 January 1847 after negotiations for a reunion had failed.

The Young Ireland movement culminated in a failed uprising (see Young Irelander Rebellion of 1848), which, influenced by the French Revolution of 1848 and further provoked by government inaction during the Great Famine and the suspension of habeas corpus, which allowed the government to imprison Young Irelanders and other political opponents without trial, was hastily planned and quickly suppressed. Following the abortive uprising, several rebel leaders were arrested and convicted of sedition. Originally sentenced to death, Smith O'Brien and other members of the Irish Confederation were transported to Van Diemen's Land.

=== Fenian movement ===
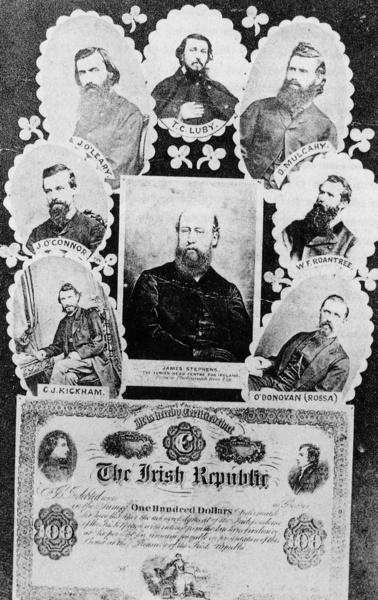
Some of the founding members of the Irish Republican Brotherhood

The Fenian movement consisted of the Fenian Brotherhood and the Irish Republican Brotherhood (IRB), fraternal organisations founded in the United States and Ireland respectively with the aim of establishing an independent republic in Ireland.

The IRB was founded on Saint Patrick's Day 1858 in Dublin. Members present at the first meeting were James Stephens, Thomas Clarke Luby, Peter Langan, Joseph Denieffe, Garrett O'Shaughnessy, and Charles Kickham. Stephens had previously spent time exiled in Paris, along with John O'Mahony, having taken part in the uprising of 1848 and fleeing to avoid capture. O'Mahony left France for America in the mid-1850s and founded the Emmet Monument Association with Michael Doheny. Stephens returned to Ireland in 1856.

The original oath of the society, drawn up by Luby under Stephens' direction, read:

I, AB., do solemnly swear, in the presence of Almighty God, that I will do my utmost, at every risk, while life lasts, to make [other versions, according to Luby, establish in'] Ireland an independent Democratic Republic; that I will yield implicit obedience, in all things not contrary to the law of God [ 'laws of morality'] to the commands of my superior officers; and that I shall preserve inviolable secrecy regarding all the transactions [ 'affairs'] of this secret society that may be confided in me. So help me God! Amen.

The Fenian Brotherhood was the IRB's counterpart organisation, formed in the same year in the United States by O'Mahony and Doheny. The Fenian Brotherhood's main purpose was to supply weapons and funds for its Irish counterpart and raise support for the Irish republican movement in the United States. The term "Fenian" was coined by O'Mahony, who named the American wing of the movement after the Fianna – a class of warriors that existed in Gaelic Ireland. The term became popular and is still in use, especially in Northern Ireland and Scotland, where it has expanded to refer to all Irish nationalists and republicans, as well as being a pejorative term for Irish Catholics.

Public support for the Fenian movement in Ireland grew in November 1861 with the funeral of Terence MacManus, a member of the Irish Confederation, which Stephens and the Fenians had organised – having "recognized the potential of street parades for mobilizing supporters and influencing onlookers". The popularity endowed by the procession and oration established the tradition of republican funerals, a ritual instrumental as evidenced by the oration at Jeremiah O'Donovan Rossa's funeral. (Note: Of republican funerals, Guy Beiner wrote "Unlike the near contemporaneous public funerals in Third Republic France, which were civic ceremonies, Irish nationalist funerals were demonstrations of opposition and resistance. The making of martyrs out of former rebels marked the rise of a nationalist counter-hegemony that challenged British hegemony by audaciously occupying a public sphere previously dominated by imperial iconography.") Popular perception elsewhere deemed the movement as terrorisitic – a persistent perception of republicanism thereafter. Nevertheless, the likes of Rossa would raise the public profile of the movement by their evocation of martyrdom and highlighting of prisoner maltreatment. (Note: The legitimacy and recognition of republican prisoners is a central concern of republican thought and action.) Support from America proved both lucrative and troublesome as transatlantic members waged a dynamite campaign in Britain. A total of twenty-five major explosions beset Irish nationalism's perception and dictated Britain's approach towards Ireland and the "Irish question".

In 1865 the Fenian Brotherhood in America had split into two factions. One was led by O'Mahony with Stephens' support. The other, which was more powerful, was led by William R. Roberts. The Fenians had always planned an armed rebellion, but there was now disagreement as to how and where this rebellion might be carried out. Roberts' faction preferred focusing all military efforts on British Canada (Roberts and his supporters theorised that victory for the American Fenians in nearby Canada would propel the Irish republican movement as a whole to success). The other, headed by O'Mahony, proposed that a rising in Ireland be planned for 1866. In spite of this, the O'Mahony wing of the movement itself tried and failed to capture Campobello Island in New Brunswick in April 1866. Following this failure, the Roberts faction of the Fenian Brotherhood carried out its own, occupying the village of Fort Erie, Ontario on 31 May 1866 and engaging Canadian troops at the battles of Ridgeway and Fort Erie on 2 June. It was in reference to Fenians fighting in this battle that the name "Irish Republican Army" was first used. These attacks (and those that followed) in Canada are collectively known as the "Fenian raids".

=== Nineteenth century onward ===
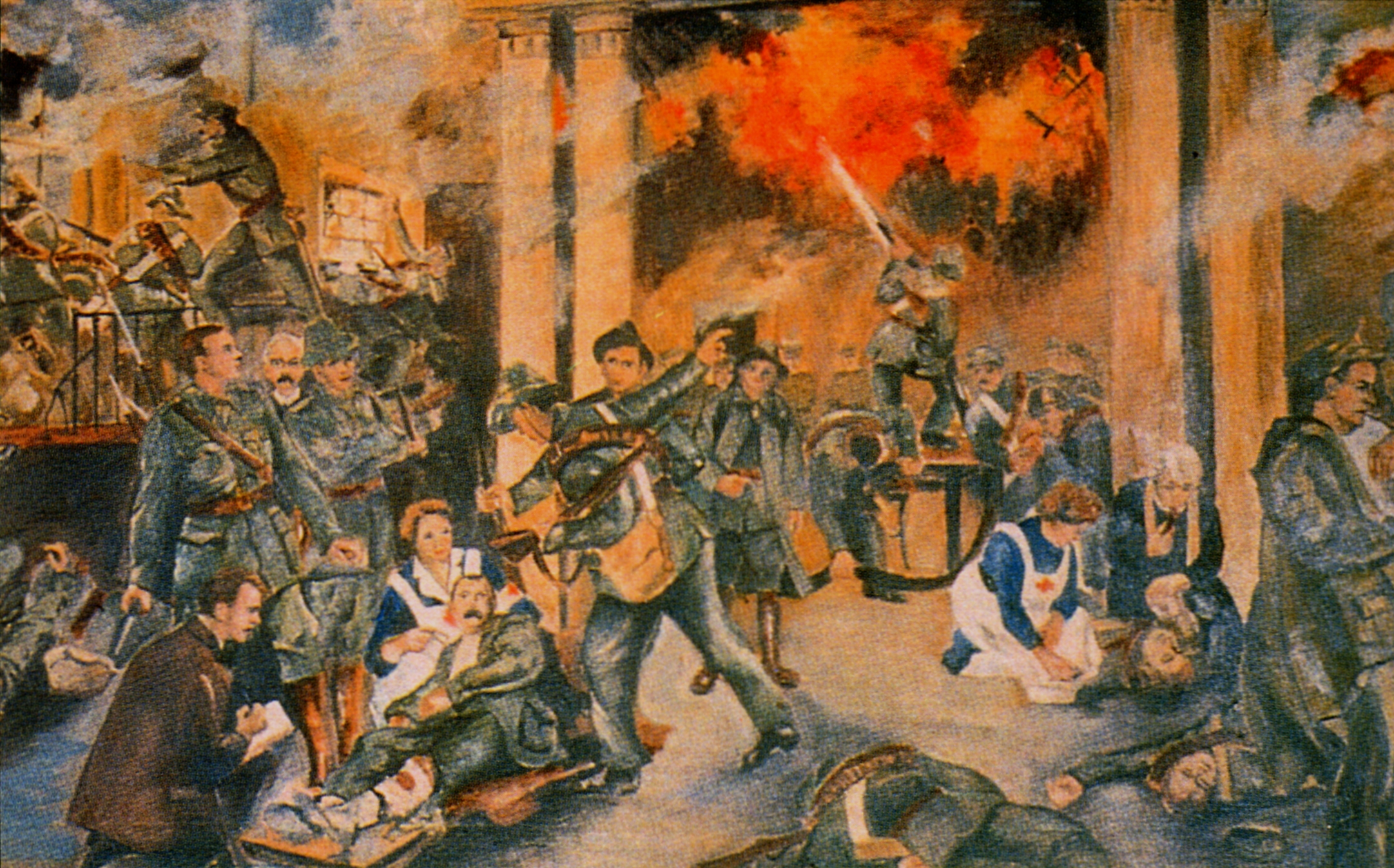
A depiction of the Easter Rising

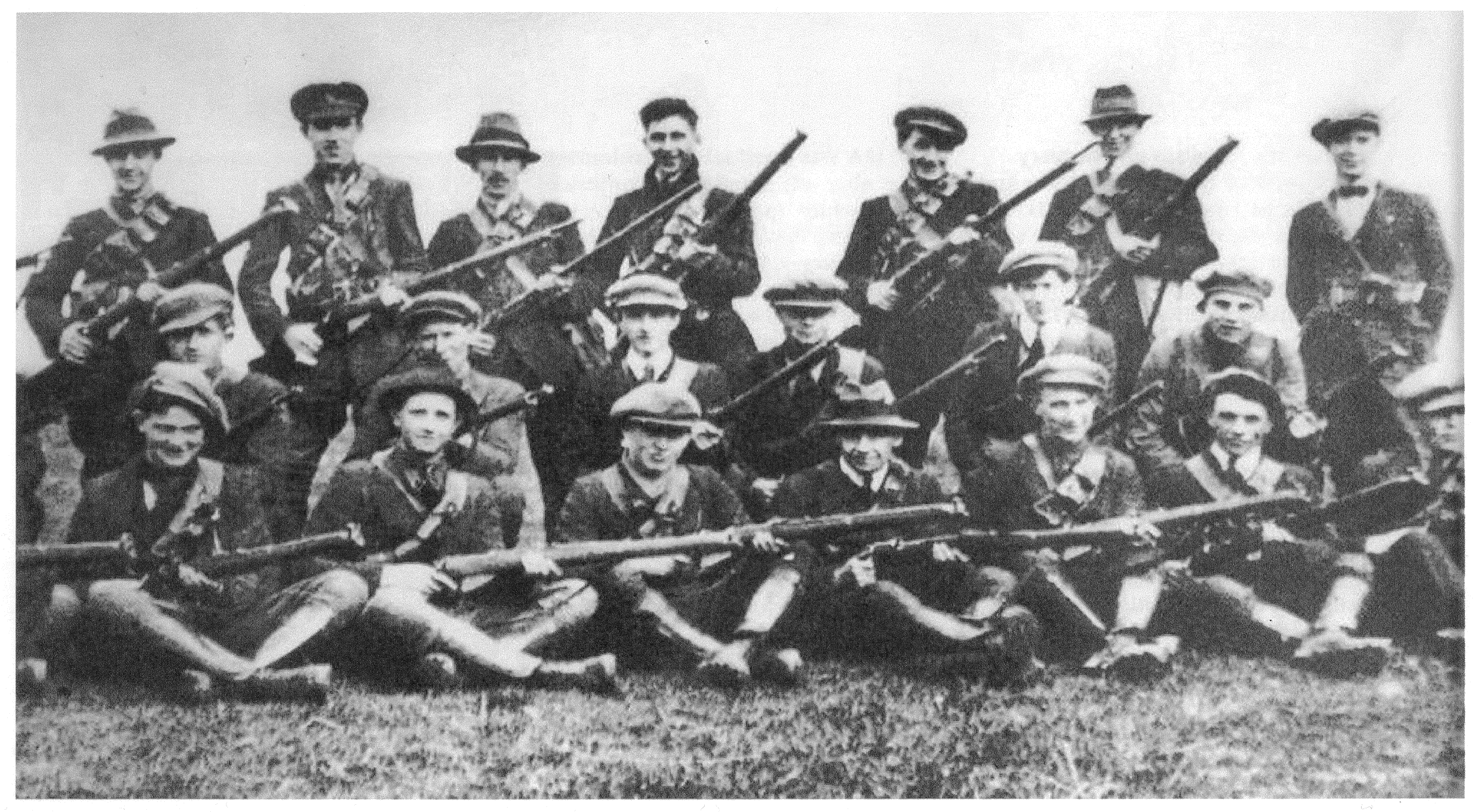
Seán Hogan's IRA flying column during the Irish War of Independence.

Irish republican and other independence movements were suppressed by the British authorities following the merging of Ireland with Britain into the United Kingdom after the Act of Union in 1801. Nationalist rebellions against British rule in 1803, by Robert Emmet, 1848 (by the Young Irelanders) and 1865 and 1867 (by the Fenians) were followed by harsh reprisals by British forces.

The National Council, was formed in 1903, by Maud Gonne and Arthur Griffith, on the occasion of the visit of King Edward VII to Dublin. Its purpose was to lobby Dublin Corporation to refrain from presenting an address to the king. The motion to present an address was duly defeated, but the National Council remained in existence as a pressure group with the aim of increasing nationalist representation on local councils. The first annual convention of the National Council on 28 November 1905 was notable for two things: the decision, by a majority vote (with Griffith dissenting), to open branches and organise on a national basis; and the presentation by Griffith of his 'Hungarian' policy, which was now called the Sinn Féin policy. This meeting is usually taken as the date of the foundation of the Sinn Féin party.

In 1916 the Easter Rising, organised by the Irish Republican Brotherhood, was launched in Dublin and the Irish Republic was proclaimed, albeit without significant popular support. The Rising was suppressed after six days, and most of its leaders were executed by the British authorities. This was a turning point in Irish history, leading to the War of Independence and the end of British rule in most of Ireland.

From 1919 to 1921 the Irish Republican Army (IRA) was organised as a guerrilla army, led by Richard Mulcahy and with Michael Collins as Director of Intelligence and fought against the British. During the Anglo-Irish War, the British government formed a paramilitary police force consisting of former soldiers, known as the "Black and Tans", to reinforce the Royal Irish Constabulary's Auxiliary Division. Republicans were the primary adversary of these forces, whose warfare included pillaging and extrajudicial executions. Both sides used similar tactics: hair cutting, arson attacks, taking of hostages and executions. Republicans also established sovereign courts, a considerable symbol of the movement's public support.

In August 1920 Irish Republican prisoners went on a hunger strike demanding release from prison, and reinstatement of their status as political prisoners (1920 Cork hunger strike). Three men died during this time including the Sinn Féin Lord Mayor of Cork Terence MacSwiney. Among the most infamous of the Black and Tans actions were the Bloody Sunday massacre in November 1920 and the burning of half the city of Cork in December that same year. These actions, together with the popularity of the republican ideals in Ireland and repression of republican political expressions by the British government, led to widespread support across Ireland for the Irish rebels.

In 1921, the British government led by David Lloyd George negotiated the Anglo-Irish Treaty with republican leaders led by Arthur Griffith who had been delegated as plenipotentiaries on behalf of the Second Dáil, thus ending the conflict.

=== Irish Free State and Republic of Ireland ===
Though many across the country were unhappy with the Anglo-Irish Treaty (since, during the war, the IRA had fought for independence for all Ireland and for a republic, not a partitioned dominion under the British crown), some republicans were satisfied that the Treaty was the best that could be achieved at the time. However, a substantial number opposed it. Dáil Éireann, the Irish parliament, voted by 64 votes to 57 to ratify it, the majority believing that the treaty created a new base from which to move forward. Éamon de Valera, who had served as President of the Irish Republic during the war, refused to accept the decision of the Dáil and led the opponents of the treaty out of the House. The pro-Treaty republicans organised themselves into the Cumann na nGaedheal party, while the anti-Treaty republicans retained the Sinn Féin name. The IRA itself split between pro-Treaty and anti-Treaty elements, with the former forming the nucleus of the new Irish National Army.

Michael Collins became Commander-in-Chief of the National Army. Shortly afterwards, some dissidents, apparently without the authorisation of the anti-Treaty IRA Army Executive, occupied the Four Courts in Dublin and kidnapped JJ "Ginger" O'Connell, a pro-Treaty general. The new government, responding to this provocation and to intensified British pressure following the assassination by an anti-treaty IRA unit in London of Henry Wilson, ordered the regular army to take the Four Courts, thereby beginning the Irish Civil War. It is believed that Collins continued to fund and supply the IRA in Northern Ireland throughout the civil war, but, after his death, W. T. Cosgrave (the new President of the Executive Council, or prime minister) discontinued this support.

By May 1923, the war ended in the order by Frank Aiken, telling IRA members to dump arms. However, the harsh measures adopted by both sides, including assassinations, executions and other atrocities, left a bitter legacy in Irish politics for decades to follow. In October 1923 mass hunger strikes were undertaken by Irish republican prisoners protesting the continuation of their internment without trial by the newly formed Irish Free State - three men died during the 1923 Irish Hunger Strikes.

De Valera, who had strongly supported the Republican anti-treaty side in the Civil War, reconsidered his views while in jail and came to accept the ideas of political activity under the terms of the Free State constitution. Rather than abstaining from Free State politics entirely, he now sought to republicanise it from within. However, he and his supporters – which included most Sinn Féin TDs – failed to convince a majority of the anti-treaty Sinn Féin of these views and the movement split again. In 1926, he formed a new party called Fianna Fáil ("Soldiers of Destiny"), taking most of Sinn Féin's TDs with him. In 1931, following the enactment of the Statute of Westminster, the country became a sovereign state along with the other Dominions and the United Kingdom. The following year, De Valera was appointed President of the Executive Council of the Free State and began a slow process of turning the country from a constitutional monarchy to a constitutional republic, thus fulfilling Collins's prediction of "the freedom to achieve freedom".

By then, the IRA was engaged in confrontations with the Blueshirts, a quasi-fascist group led by a former War of Independence and pro-Treaty leader, Eoin O'Duffy. O'Duffy looked to Fascist Italy as an example for Ireland to follow. Several hundred supporters of O'Duffy briefly went to Spain to volunteer on the Nationalist side in the Spanish Civil War, and a smaller number of ex-IRA members, communists and others participated on the Republican side.

In 1937, the Constitution of Ireland was drafted by the de Valera government and approved via referendum by the majority of the population of the Free State. The constitution changed the name of the state to Éire in the Irish language (Ireland in English) and asserted its national territory as the whole of Ireland. (Note: While Articles 2 and 3 of the Constitution defined the national territory to be the whole island, they also confined the state's jurisdiction to the area that had been the Irish Free State.) The new state was headed by a President of Ireland elected by universal suffrage. The new Constitution removed all reference to the monarchy but foreign diplomats continued to present their credentials to the King in accordance with the Executive Authority (External Relations) Act 1936 which had not been repealed. The new state had the objective characteristics of a republic and was referred to as such by de Valera himself, but, it remained within the British Commonwealth and was regarded by the British as a Dominion, like Canada, Australia, New Zealand, and South Africa. Furthermore, the claim to the whole of the island did not reflect practical reality and inflamed anti-Dublin sentiment among northern Protestants.

In 1948, Fianna Fáil went out of office for the first time in sixteen years. John A. Costello, leader of the coalition government, announced his intention to declare Ireland a republic. The Republic of Ireland Act 1948, which "described" the state as the Republic of Ireland (without changing its name or constitutional status), led the British government to pass the Ireland Act 1949, which declared that Northern Ireland would continue as part of the United Kingdom unless the Parliament of Northern Ireland consented to leave; and Ireland ceased to be a member of the Commonwealth. As a result of this – and also because continuing struggle against the Dublin government was futile – the republican movement decided to focus on Northern Ireland from then on. The decision was announced by the IRA in its Easter statement of 1949.

== Republicanism in Northern Ireland ==
=== 1921–1966 ===
The area that was to become Northern Ireland amounted to six of the nine counties of Ulster, although in the last all Ireland election (1918 general election) counties Fermanagh and Tyrone had Sinn Féin/Nationalist Party (Irish Parliamentary Party) majorities. In 1921, Ireland was partitioned. Most of the country became part of the independent Irish Free State. However, six out of the nine counties of Ulster remained part of the United Kingdom as Northern Ireland. During this time (1920–1922) the newly formed Northern Ireland saw "savage and unprecedented" communal violence between unionists and nationalists (see The Troubles in Ulster (1920–1922)).

In the 1921 elections in Northern Ireland:

- Antrim, Down and the borough of Belfast had Unionist majorities of over 25%.
- In Derry, the breakdown in that election was 56.2% Unionist / 43.8% Nationalist.
- In Armagh, the ratio was 55.3% Unionist / 44.7% Nationalist.
- In Fermanagh and Tyrone (a single constituency), the ratio 54.7% Nationalist / 45.3% Unionist. (Tyrone was 55.4% Catholic in the 1911 census and 55.5% in the 1926 census, though of course only adults had votes on the other hand religious and national affiliations while closely linked are not as absolute as commonly assumed.) Within most of these counties there were large pockets which predominantly nationalist or Unionist (South Armagh, West Tyrone, West Londonderry and parts of North Antrim were largely nationalist whereas much of North Armagh, East Londonderry, East Tyrone and most of Antrim were/are largely Unionist).

This territory of Northern Ireland, as established by the Government of Ireland Act 1920, had its own provincial government which was controlled for 50 years until 1972 by the conservative Ulster Unionist Party (UUP). The tendency to vote on sectarian lines and the proportions of each religious denomination ensured that there would never be a change of government. In local government, constituency boundaries were drawn to divide nationalist communities into two or even three constituencies and so weaken their effect (see Gerrymandering).

The (mainly Catholic) Nationalist population in Northern Ireland, besides feeling politically alienated, was also economically alienated, often with worse living standards compared to their Protestant (mainly Unionist) neighbours, with fewer job opportunities, and living in ghettos in Belfast, Derry, Armagh and other places. Many Catholics considered the Unionist government was undemocratic, bigoted and favoured Protestants. Emigration for economic reasons kept the nationalist population from growing, despite its higher birth rate. Although poverty, (e)migration and unemployment were fairly widespread (albeit not to the same extent) among Protestants as well, on the other hand the economic situation in Northern Ireland (even for Catholics) was for a long time arguably still better than in the Republic of Ireland.

During the 1930s the IRA launched minor attacks against the Royal Ulster Constabulary (RUC) and British Army in Northern Ireland. During World War II the IRA leadership hoped for support from Germany, and chief of staff Seán Russell travelled there in 1940; he died later that year after falling ill on a U-boat that was bringing him back to Ireland (possibly with a view to starting a German sponsored revolution in Ireland). Suspected republicans were interned on both sides of the border, for different reasons.

The Border Campaign in the mid-50s was the last attempt at traditional military action and was an abject failure.

=== 1966–1969 ===
In the late 1960s, Irish political activist groups found parallels between their struggle against religious discrimination and the civil rights campaign of African Americans against racial discrimination in the US. Student leaders such a Bernadette Devlin McAliskey and Nationalist politicians such as Austin Currie tried to use non-violent direct action to draw attention to the blatant discrimination. Republicans, largely demilitarised at the time, engaged considerably with the civil rights campaign. By 1968, Europe as a whole was engulfed in a struggle between radicalism and conservativism. In Sinn Féin, the same debate raged. The dominant analysis was that Protestant Irishmen and women would never be bombed into a united Ireland. The only way forward was to have both sides embrace socialism and forget their sectarian hatreds. They resolved to no longer to be drawn into inter-communal violence.

As a response to the civil rights campaign, militant loyalist paramilitary groups started to emerge in the Protestant community. The Ulster Volunteer Force (UVF) was the first. The UVF had originally existed among loyalist Ulster Protestants before World War I to oppose Home Rule. In the 1960s it was relaunched by militant loyalists, encouraged by certain politicians, to oppose any attempt to reunite Northern Ireland with the Republic of Ireland, which is how they saw any change in their status vis-a-vis Catholics.

By mid-1969 the violence in Northern Ireland exploded. Consistent with their new political ideology, the IRA declined to intervene. By late August, the British government had to intervene and declare a state of emergency, sending a large number of troops into Northern Ireland to stop the intercommunal violence. Initially welcomed by some Catholics as protectors, later events such as Bloody Sunday and the Falls Road curfew turned many against the British Army.

=== 1970–1985 ===
Divisions began to emerge in the Republican movement between leftists and traditional militants. The leader of the IRA, Cathal Goulding believed that the IRA could not beat the British with military tactics and should turn into a workers' revolutionary movement that would overthrow both governments to achieve a 32-county socialist republic through the will of the people (after WWII the IRA no longer engaged in any actions against the Republic). Goulding also drove the IRA into an ideologically Marxist–Leninist direction which attracted idealistic young supporters in the Republic, but alienated and angered many of the IRA's core supporters in the North. In particular, his decision to regard the UVF as deluded rather than as the enemy, was anathema to traditionalists and those who were its potential victims.

The argument led to a split in 1970, between the Official IRA (supporters of Goulding's Marxist line) and the Provisional IRA (also called Provos, traditional nationalist republicans). The Provos were led by Seán Mac Stíofáin and immediately began a large scale campaign against British state forces and economic targets in Northern Ireland. The Official IRA were also initially drawn into an armed campaign by the escalating communal violence. In 1972, the Official IRA declared a cease-fire, which, apart from feuds with other republican groups, has been maintained to date. Nowadays the term 'Irish Republican Army' almost always denotes the Provisional IRA.

Throughout the 1970s and 1980s the conflict continued claiming thousands of lives, with the UVF (and other loyalist groups) extending attacks into the Republic of Ireland and the IRA launching attacks on targets in England. However some things slowly began to change. In the 1980s Provisional Sinn Féin (the Provisional IRA's political wing) began contesting elections and by the mid-1990s was representing the republican position at peace negotiations. In the loyalist movement splits occurred, the Ulster Unionist Party made tentative attempts to reform itself and attract Catholics into supporting the union with Britain, while the radical Democratic Unionist Party (DUP) led by Ian Paisley began attracting working-class Protestant loyalists who felt alienated by the UUP's overtures towards Catholics.

In 1976 the British government withdrew Special Category Status (prisoner of war rather than criminal status) for convicted paramilitary prisoners. Republican prisoners began a blanket protest which escalated into a dirty protest in 1978. In 1980, seven republican prisoners participated in a hunger strike, which ended after 53 days. The 1981 Irish hunger strike was carried out over a seven-month period with the goal of re-establishing the prisoners political status. This hunger strike drew worldwide attention due to the deaths of ten hunger strikers including Bobby Sands. During the 20th century a total of 22 Irish Republicans have died while on hunger strike.

=== Since 1986 ===
During the late 1980s the British Government became increasingly willing to give concessions to Irish nationalism, such as the Anglo-Irish Agreement and extending to, the Northern Ireland Secretary, Peter Brooke's declaration of "no selfish, strategic or economic interest in Northern Ireland.", causing uproar amongst strands of Unionism. However, violent Republican action didn't cease, giving Unionism and Britain less reason to work with violent Republicans. This situation changed in 1992–93 with Hume's-Adams' talks producing a commitment from Sinn Féin to move towards peaceful methods.

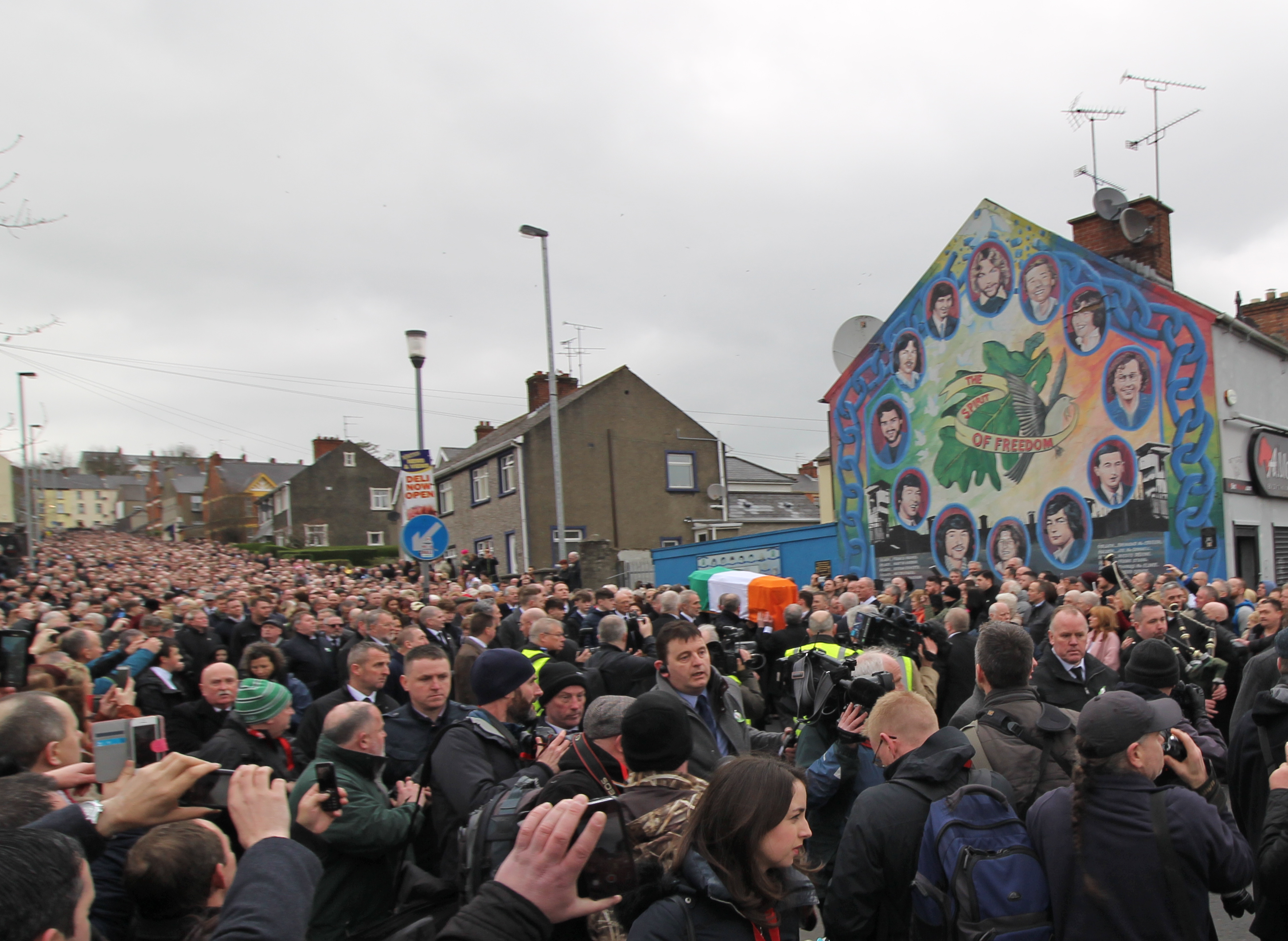
The funeral procession of Irish republican politician Martin McGuinness, Derry, Northern Ireland

In 1994 the leaders of Northern Ireland's two largest nationalist parties, Gerry Adams, the leader of Sinn Féin and John Hume, the leader of the Social Democratic and Labour Party (SDLP) entered into peace negotiations with Unionist leaders like David Trimble of the UUP and the British government. At the table most of the paramilitary groups (including the IRA and UVF) had representatives. In 1998 when the IRA endorsed the Good Friday Agreement between nationalist and unionist parties and both governments, another small group split from the IRA to form the Real IRA (RIRA). The Continuity and Real IRA have both engaged in attacks not only against the British and loyalists, but even against their fellow nationalists (members of Sinn Féin, the SDLP and IRA).

Since 1998, the IRA and UVF have adhered to a ceasefire.

Today the republican movement can be divided into moderates who wish to reunite with the Republic through peaceful means and dissident republicans who wish to continue an armed campaign. Ideological divides in Northern republicanism has its origins in the late 1970s. Dissidents emphasis the importance of ideology and reject reformism, regarding institutional change as ineffective and whitewashing. Dissidents assert that basis of armed republicanism is sovereignty rather than equality. Some dissidents support the emergence of peace while critiquing the political means.

In late July 2005, the IRA announced that the armed conflict was over and that their weapons were to be put out of use. A large stock of weapons was reportedly "decommissioned" later that year. Some Unionists disputed the claim that this represented the entire stock of IRA weaponry.

== Ideology ==
Irish republicanism has encompassed various schools of thought and praxis thereof: "It has embraced ‘militant nationalists, unreconstructed militarists, romantic Fenians, Gaelic Republicans, Catholic sectarians, Northern defenders, international Marxists, socialists, libertarians and liberal Protestants,’" Recurrent ideals include national self-determination and ethno-religious identity.

=== Rejection of the British state ===
Irish republicans view British rule in any part of Ireland as an inherently illegitimate, foreign regime. A variant of this is Irish republican legitimism, which also rejects the Republic of Ireland because of its tacit acceptance of partition and continuing British rule in Northern Ireland.

The rejection of the legitimacy of British rule extends to all institutions of the British state. This includes rejection of the British parliament (abstentionism), and rejection of British police and court systems, which has led to republicans developing alternatives. Several Irish Republican political parties have, however, contested Northern Irish local elections since the 1970s.

=== Violence ===
According to Malachi O'Doherty, Sinn Féin politicians often presented republican violence as an inevitable result of partition and British rule. This rhetorical device allowed for some republican politicians to evade responsibility for violence and further their political goals of a reunited Ireland. Colonialism and neocolonialism have been invoked by republicans in relation to the movement's militancy.

=== Connection to left-wing politics ===
Irish republicanism was influenced by French radicalism. Typical of these classical Radicals are 19th century such as the United Irishmen in the 1790s, Young Irelanders in the 1840s, Fenian Brotherhood in the 1880s, as well as Sinn Féin, and Fianna Fáil in the 1920s. Although recurring, socialist thought has proven contentious: class interests prioritised by some while others emphasise nationalist rhetoric. The Land War was used to organise republican action with little regard to class conflict. Class politics – coupled with the Northern Irish civil rights movement - have been credited by some republicans to have unduly demilitarised the movement, especially at the onset of the Troubles.

=== Relationship with the Christian churches ===
A 1983 article examined statements by Irish republicans on the issue of religion, and found that the attitudes contrasted with "the commonsense view" that Sinn Féin and the Provisional IRA supported Catholics and opposed Protestants. There has been long-standing mutual dislike between the Catholic hierarchy and the Republican movement, with the latter seeing the former as complicit in British occupation of Ireland. In Belfast, during the time of partition, republicanism was rejected by the majority of the Catholic population, including the clergy.

Articles in An Phoblacht often upheld the morality of parish priests and pastors of all Christian denominations rather than bishops and church leaders, with respect for the Christian tradition of social justice. The article said that An Phoblacht "bends over backwards to be sympathetic to men who have expressed consistently anti-Catholic sentiments", including at times the Loyalist leader Ian Paisley, as they are seen as fellow Irish citizens whereas the British forces are seen as the principal enemy.

Republicans have often denied that their attacks on the Ulster Defence Regiment or Royal Ulster Constabulary are sectarian attacks on Protestants by claiming that they attack these groups because they are seen as complicit in "the oppression of the nationalist people" and not because of the religious beliefs of the members. However, a series of attacks in the Troubles, such as the Kingsmill massacre, that collectively killed 130 Protestant civilians were classified as "sectarian" in Malcolm Sutton's work on those killed during the Troubles. This makes sectarian killings of civilians 7% of the total killings attributed to the IRA (1,823), as opposed to the loyalist paramilitaries, of whose 1,027 killings, 70% or 718 were deliberate sectarian killings of Catholic civilians.

=== Historiography ===
The history of republicanism is paramount to the ideology: "The story of the past told by republicans is one of oppression, resistance, solidarity, and sacrifice...which both defines and justifies the movement". The remembrance of republicans as equally dutiful and ordinary is used to justify action and assert victimhood, with memorialisation at large assuming a rhetorical purpose.

"[M]aintain[ing] fidelity" and upholding sacrificial notions function as an "imperative" for republicans: commemoration, thus, is both ubiquitous and political as evidenced by Sinn Féin's literature and rationale during the peace process. During the process, the ambitions of the civil rights movement were contended as "the ultimate goal of the conflict", thus emphasing a continuity. The predominance of memory is a point of critique, lambasted as limiting and dogmatic and, in terms of Northern Ireland, commemoration has inspired controversy.

Events of particular significance include the United Ireland Rebellion, the Easter Rising and the War of Independence – the centenary of the Rising unified nationalists in commemoration, "loyalty to the 1916 Republic" being a fundamental present in all sects of republicanism. The proclamation of said republic drew upon the past itself in justifying action.

== Political parties ==
=== Active republican parties ===
The following are active republican parties in Ireland.

- Sinn Féin is a republican party in Ireland. Throughout the Northern Ireland troubles, it was closely allied with the Provisional Irish Republican Army, publicly arguing for the validity of its armed campaign. Its policy platform combines civic nationalism with democratic socialist views on economic and social issues. It is led by Mary Lou McDonald and organises in both the Republic of Ireland and Northern Ireland. The Party was also known as "Provisional" Sinn Féin by the media and commentators, having split from what later became known as the "Official" Sinn Féin (later the Workers' Party) in 1970, because the latter had voted to enter a 'partitionist parliament'. In 1986, it reversed its original policy of not taking seats in Dáil Éireann, prompting another split, when Republican Sinn Féin was formed. By the early 21st century it had replaced the Social Democratic and Labour Party (SDLP) as Northern Ireland's largest nationalist party. As of 2020, it holds seven seats in the British parliament, thirty-seven seats in the Dáil, six in the Seanad and 26 in the Northern Ireland Assembly. Sinn Féin members contest elections to the British parliament on an abstentionist basis, that is, they refuse to take their seats in that parliament as they refuse to accept the right of that body to rule in any part of Ireland.
- The Workers' Party is a socialist and Marxist republican political party in Ireland. It developed from the majority faction in the 1970 split in Sinn Féin, which remained with the existing leadership and became known as Official Sinn Féin, while the abstentionist minority formed Provisional Sinn Féin after opposing moves towards taking seats in elected assemblies. In Northern Ireland, the northern section contested elections as Republican Clubs; after the split it used the names Official Republican Clubs, Republican Clubs the Workers' Party and Sinn Féin the Workers' Party before becoming the Workers' Party in 1982. The party was associated with the Official IRA, whose 1972 ceasefire reflected the Officials' view that violence was deepening sectarian division and obstructing working-class unity. A further split in 1974 led to the formation of the Irish Republican Socialist Party and its military wing, the Irish National Liberation Army. In 1992, six of its seven TDs left to form Democratic Left. The party supported the Good Friday Agreement and emphasised anti-sectarian class politics. In 2021, a faction centred around the party's former Northern Ireland leadership and several Cork members broke away from the Workers' Party; in Northern Ireland, Belfast Media later described rival claims over the Workers' Party name after the Workers' Party reintroduced the historical name Workers' Party Republican Clubs.
- Fianna Fáil was founded as an expressly republican party, one born out of Sinn Féin but which dropped abstentionism in order to engage in constitutional politics in Ireland. In fact, Seán Lemass had originally desired for the name of the party to simply be "The Republican Party", however, Éamon de Valera muted that idea in favour of a name inspired by the Irish language and culture. Since the 1930s and 1940s, a period which saw Fianna Fáil imprison physical force Republicans en masse, to what degree Fianna Fáil can be still described as "Republican" has been contested. The party itself, however, continues to frame itself as a Republican party; indeed in 1971 the party's commitment to this was signalled when the formal name of the party was altered to "Fianna Fáil – The Republican Party". Following the 2020 Irish general election, Sinn Féin leader Mary Lou McDonald spoke often of forming a coalition which would produce a "Republican programme for Government". Some suggested this choice of language was chosen to encourage Fianna Fáil to work with Sinn Féin under a united "Republican" banner.
- Éirígí is a socialist republican political party that formed by a small group of community and political activists who had left Sinn Féin, in Dublin in April 2006 as a political campaigns group, and became a full-fledged political party at the party's first Ardfheis (conference) in May 2007. An Independent Monitoring Commission report said the group was "a small political grouping based on revolutionary socialist principles". While it continues to be a political association, albeit, with aggressive protest activities, it was not seen as paramilitary in nature.
- Saoradh is a socialist republican party created in 2016. It is associated with dissident Republicans and is alleged to have ties to the New IRA.
- Republican Sinn Féin was formed in 1986 by former Sinn Féin leader Ruairí Ó Brádaigh who led traditional republicans in a break with Sinn Féin over the ending of the policy of abstention in relation to elections to Dáil Éireann. The party continues to operate on an abstentionist basis: it would not take seats in the assemblies of either the Republic of Ireland or Northern Ireland because it views neither as legitimate. It is linked to the Continuity IRA, whose goals are the overthrow of British rule in Northern Ireland and the unification of the island to form an independent country. In November 2009, Des Dalton replaced Ó Brádaigh as leader of Republican Sinn Féin.
- Irish Republican Socialist Party (IRSP) was founded in 1974 by former Official IRA militant Seamus Costello, who possibly had an eye towards James Connolly's Irish Socialist Republican Party of the late 19th/early 20th century when coining the party's name. Costello led other former Official IRA members dissatisfied with Cathal Goulding's policies and tactics. The party quickly organised a paramilitary wing called the Irish National Liberation Army (INLA) which has decommissioned recently. It claims to follow the principles of republican socialism as set out by the 1916 rebellion leader Connolly and radical 20th-century trade unionist James Larkin.
- Aontú, who split from Sinn Féin in 2019 in opposition to the party's support for the Repeal of the Eighth Amendment, which allowed for the legalisation of abortion in Ireland in 2018. As of 2024, Aontú has two TDs including party leader Peadar Tóibín, and five councillors across Ireland.
- Republican Network for Unity was formed in 2007 in opposition to the Sinn Féin special Ard Fheis's vote of support for the Police Service of Northern Ireland. A number of commentators view RNU as the political wing of Óglaigh na hÉireann, a militant dissident republican paramilitary group. That group committed to a ceasefire in 2017, which RNU supported.
- Anti-Imperialist Action Ireland (AIA) are a socialist republican organisation founded in 2017. The group opposes the Good Friday Agreement and abstains from elections.

=== Defunct republican parties ===
The following were republican parties in Ireland which are no longer active.

- Clann Éireann split from Cumann na nGaedheal in 1926 after the results of the Irish Boundary Commission confirmed partition between Ireland and Northern Ireland. They called for a "one and indivisible" Ireland, but found little support as those already of the anti-partition mindset were already aligned with Fianna Fáil, and were not favourable to those who had previously been in Cumann na nGaedhael.
- The Republican Congress was an attempt in 1934 by left-wing republicans to set up an explicitly socialist republican party in Ireland, however, it was hampered by the fact the IRA had no interest in supporting the endeavour (and in fact, the IRA expelled members who tried to be a part of both), and because it was torn apart almost immediately because of infighting. Members of the Republican Congress, which counted amongst its membership several of the most prominent socialists in Ireland at the time, could not decide whether they should immediately seek a "Workers Republic" or not, nor could they agree if they should embrace the idea of a Popular Front with non-socialists or not.
- Córas na Poblachta were an Irish republican party set up in 1940, supported by elements of the IRA. With the IRA at this point under the control of Seán Russell, it had seen a swing heavily to the right. Córas na Poblachta reflected that, the party entertaining relations with the Fascist party Ailtirí na hAiséirghe and some meetings of Córas na Poblachta were even attended by Eoin O'Duffy and members of the Irish Christian Front, all of whom had bitterly opposed the IRA in the early 30s. With "The Emergency" in full effect, there was little appetite or room to grow a political party in Ireland at the time and thus in practical terms Córas na Poblachta did very little.
- Clann na Poblachta were an Irish republican party set up in 1947 by former IRA Chief of Staff Seán MacBride. The party contained a broad political spectrum of Irish republicans, from former Communists to "traditionalist" republicans. The party settled on a centre-left platform promoting Social Democracy and New Deal style politics that suited the new political era of post-World War 2 Europe. Initially, they hoped to overtake Fianna Fáil as the main republican party in Irish politics and were projected to do very well, but savvy electoral manoeuvring by Éamon de Valera saw them falter in their first election. After they entered a coalition that included the traditional opponents of Irish republicanism, Fine Gael and ran into political turmoil over the Mother and Child Scheme, the party rapidly lost support. However, they were successful in formally declaring that Ireland was a Republic in 1948. Their influence waned throughout the 1950s and they were formally wound up by 1965.
- Aontacht Éireann were an Irish republican party set up in 1971 following a major political rift in Fianna Fáil caused by the Arms Crisis, in which Fianna Fáil ministers Charles Haughey and Neil Blaney were dismissed from cabinet following allegations they were involved in arranging for the IRA to be supplied with weaponry. The fallout of this caused many Fianna Fáil members to resign, amongst them Fianna Fáil minister Kevin Boland. Boland left Fianna Fáil and setup Aontacht Éireann to be a more openly republican party in Irish politics. He was joined by the likes of sitting Fianna Fáil TD Seán Sherwin. Although there was quite an amount of interest in Aontacht Éireann initially, with branches set up across Ireland, the party struggled to maintain its momentum. When Boland had resigned from Fianna Fáil, he not only gave up his cabinet position but also his seat in the Dáil as well. Without the platform to the speak in the Dáil, Boland was somewhat sidelined. The party also struggled to meaningfully separate itself from Provisional Sinn Féin, with much of the policies and the rhetoric of the party membership mirroring each other. The party only managed to take 0.9% of the national vote at the 1973 Irish general election and by 1976 the vast majority of the original membership had moved on from the party. It was formally wound up in 1984, after a period in which a far-right group has usurped the party's name and used it for their own ends for a time.

== See also ==
- Protestant Irish nationalists

== Sources ==
- Hughes, Brian (2016). Defying the IRA? Intimidation, Coercion, and Communities During the Irish Revolution. Liverpool University Press. doi:10.2307/j.ctt1ps31k0. ISBN 978-1-78138-297-4. JSTOR j.ctt1ps31k0.
- Janes, Dominic; Houen, Alex, eds. (2014). Martyrdom and Terrorism: Pre-Modern to Contemporary Perspectives. Oxford University Press.
- Leeson, D. M. (2011). The Black and Tans: British Police and Auxiliaries in the Irish War of Independence, 1920–1921. Oxford University Press. ISBN 9780191730597.
- McAuley, James W; Braniff, Máire; Spencer, Graham, eds. (2023). Troubles of the Past? History, Identity and Collective Memory in Northern Ireland. Manchester University Press. p. 102.
- McGlinchey, Marisa (2019). Unfinished Business. Manchester University Press. doi:10.7765/9781526116215. ISBN 978-1-5261-1621-5.
