= Republican Sinn Féin =

Irish republican political party

Republican Sinn Féin Sinn Féin Poblachtach
- President: Seosamh Ó Maoileoin
- Acting Vice Presidents: Martin Kelly
- Founded: November 1986 (Note: The present organisation was founded following the 1986 Sinn Fein conference. RSF claims descent from the original Sinn Fein organised in 1905 and disputes the legitimacy of the party currently bearing that name.)
- Split from: Sinn Féin
- Headquarters: Teach Dáithí Ó Conaill, 223 Parnell Street, Dublin 1, Ireland
- Newspaper: Saoirse Irish Freedom
- Paramilitary Wing: Continuity IRA (Main paramilitary), Cumann na mBan (Women's paramilitary)
- Ideology: Irish republicanism; Irish nationalism; Éire Nua; Socialism; Euroscepticism; Abstentionism; Secularism; Irish republican legitimism
- Political position: Left-wing
- Colours: Green, Gold
- Local government in the Republic of Ireland: 1 / 949

Website
- republicansinnfein.org/about-us/

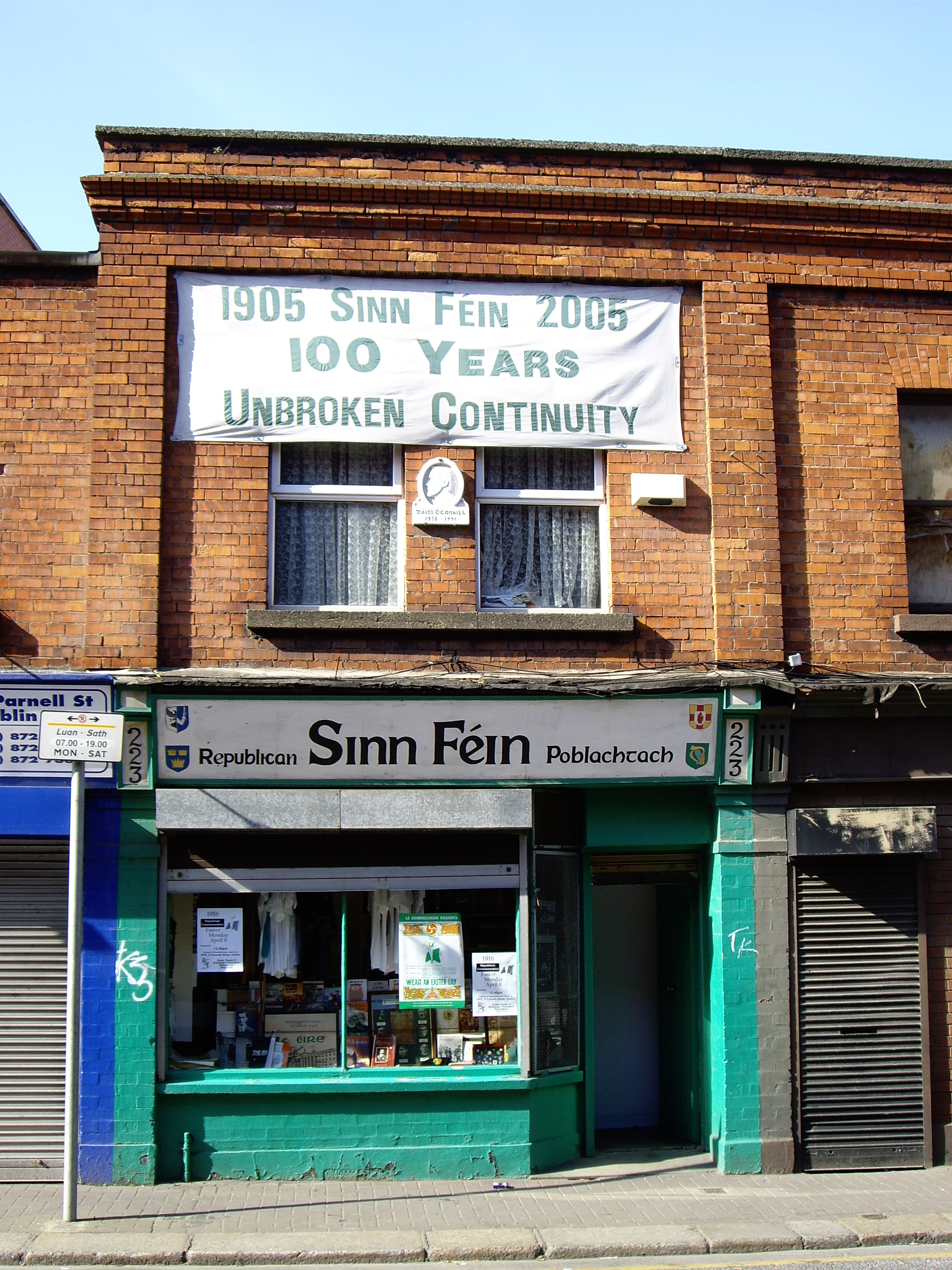
RSF offices in Dublin (2007)

Republican Sinn Féin or RSF (Irish: Sinn Féin Poblachtach) is an Irish republican political party in Ireland. The party took its present form in 1986 following a split in Sinn Féin over abstentionism, and claims to be the legitimate continuation of the Sinn Féin party founded in 1905. Its members abstain from the Oireachtas and the Northern Ireland Assembly due to the party's nonrecognition of the partition of Ireland, but take their seats when elected to local government in the Republic of Ireland.

The party emerged around the supporters of Ruairí Ó Brádaigh and Dáithí Ó Conaill. As Irish republican legitimists, they rejected the reformism of Gerry Adams and other members of Sinn Féin who supported abandoning the policy of abstentionism from the Oireachtas and accepting the legality of the Republic of Ireland. They support the Éire Nua policy which allows for devolution of power to provincial governments. RSF holds that the Irish Republic proclaimed in 1916 legally continues to exist, and that the Continuity Irish Republican Army Council is its de jure government.

The organisation views itself as representing "true" or "traditional" Irish republicanism, while in the mainstream media the organisation is portrayed as a political expression of "dissident republicanism". Republican Sinn Féin rejects the Good Friday Agreement and the Anglo-Irish Treaty; as part of this they assert that Irish republicans have the right to use militant means to "defend the Irish Republic" and considers the Continuity Irish Republican Army (IRA) to be the legitimate army of the Irish Republic, and the Continuity IRA Army Council its legal government.

== History ==
The modern origins of the party date from the mid 1980s. The decision to form, reorganise or reconstitute, as its supporters see it, the organisation was taken in response to Gerry Adams-led Sinn Féin's decision at its 1986 ard fheis to end its policy of abstentionism and to allow elected Sinn Féin Teachtaí Dála (TDs) to take their seats in Leinster House's Dáil Éireann. Those who went on to form RSF opposed this move as it signalled a departure from the traditional republican analysis, which viewed the Dáil as an illegal assembly set up by an act of Westminster. They argued that republicans owed their allegiance to the Irish Republic, maintaining that this state existed de jure and that its authority rested with the IRA Army Council. (See: Irish republican legitimism) As Ruairí Ó Brádaigh declared:

With regard to councils, Sinn Féin has always been in the councils and that is as near to the enemy system that we dare to go. Sitting in Leinster House is not a revolutionary activity. Once you go in there, once you sign the roll of the House and accept the institutions of the state, once you accept their rulings, you will not be able to do it according to your rules. You will have to go according to their rules and they can stand up and gang up on you and put you out on the street and keep you out on the street.

And those in Leinster House, who have done everything; the firing-squads, the prison cells, the internment camps, the hunger strikes; the lot and weren't able to break this movement, that they can come and say "At last, we have them toeing the line, it took us 65 years, but they have come in from the cold, they have come in from the wilderness and we have them now." Never! That is what I say to you. Never!

Although it was passed by a two-thirds majority, those who went on to re-organise RSF claimed that the decision to end abstention was invalid under the Sinn Féin constitution, Section 1b of which stated: "No person ... who approves of or supports the candidature of persons who sign any form or give any kind of written or verbal undertaking of intention to take their seats in these institutions, shall be admitted to membership or allowed to retain membership." They pointed out that in their opinion the correct procedure was to drop or amend Section 1b of the constitution in one year, then come back the next year and propose entering Leinster House, when Section 1b was no longer in operation. In protest, they staged a walkout from the ardfheis and reconvened the ardfheis at another venue. RSF subsequently claimed that the delegates who had voted to drop abstentionism had in effect expelled themselves from the party. It is on this basis that RSF views itself as the only party entitled to the name of Sinn Féin and the sole legitimate successor to the original Sinn Féin established in 1905. Supporters of abstentionism also claimed that the vote at the ardfheis was gerrymandered. Journalist Ed Moloney points out that in 1986 the number of votes at the ardfheis, which reflects the size of Sinn Féin, almost doubled from 1985 to 1986, and then reverted to the 1985 level in 1987.

Adams-led Provisional Sinn Féin argued that a previous ardfheis in 1983 amended the constitution so that "no aspect of the constitution and rules be closed to discussion". This was done to enable the ardfheis to debate a motion to allow Sinn Féin candidates to stand in elections to the European Parliament and to take their seats if successful. Some argue that this argument is weakened, by the fact that candidature to the European Parliament had already been debated at the 1978 ardfheis, when a motion to stand candidates in the 1979 European elections was defeated at the Sinn Féin ardfheis. A vote to change abstentionism from a principle to a tactic failed to achieve a two-thirds majority vote in 1985. The results were 181 opposed and 161 in favour.

There is disagreement on the number of people who walked out. Brian Feeney claims that after the vote was passed about 20 members, led by Ruairí Ó Brádaigh, walked out. J. Bowyer Bell, in The Irish Troubles, states that Ó Brádaigh and Dáithí Ó Conaill "and about one hundred others walked out to form Republican Sinn Féin (RSF) at a previously hired hall in a hotel outside Dublin". Whatever the number, that evening, approximately 130 people, including some of the delegates who voted against the motion, reconvened at Dublin's West County Hotel and established RSF. By itself, the RSF Officer Board formed that evening had 6 members, also formed was an organising committee of 15 members. Bell also notes that in response to the split, there was a "flurry of military operations in and around Belfast" by the Provisional IRA during the remainder of the year to show "country militants that the city was not a centre of politics".

At the centre of those who helped to re-organise as Republican Sinn Féin were key people who formed the Provisional IRA and Sinn Féin, including Ruairí Ó Brádaigh, Des Long, Joe O'Neill, Frank Glynn, and Dáithí Ó Conaill. Among those in attendance at the first Bodenstown commemoration, staged by the version of the Continuity Republican Movement which RSF sees itself as forming part of, were four members of the first Provisional IRA Army Council: Ruairí Ó Brádaigh (Longford), Dáithí Ó Conaill (Cork/Dublin), Leo Martin (Belfast), and Paddy Mulcahy (Limerick). Among those present at the West County Hotel when RSF was formed was Billy McKee, an early member of the Provisional IRA Army Council, and the former O/C Belfast Brigade of the Provisional IRA. Another early supporter of RSF was Sean Tracey, a member of the first Provisional IRA Army Council, who later "drifted away" from RSF.

The influence of those who founded Provisional Sinn Féin should not be understated. Of the 20 people on the Sinn Féin Caretaker Executive formed in January 1970, ten were still involved in PSF in 1986. Nine of the ten joined Republican Sinn Féin.

The origins of the party are also described in the documentary "Unfinished Business: The Politics of 'Dissident' Irish Republicans".

== Positions ==
=== Irish sovereignty ===
Republican Sinn Féin believes that the Irish Republic proclaimed in 1916 during the Irish Republican Brotherhood organised Easter Rising, founded an all-Ireland sovereign state and that the first and second meetings of the Dáil Éireann were the last legitimate sitting governments of Ireland. RSF rejects the Anglo-Irish Treaty of 1921 which led to the creation of the Irish Free State and Northern Ireland as an act of treason and refer to it as the "Treaty of Surrender." The regime sitting in Leinster House is regarded by RSF as being founded as an illegitimate British-puppet state (and latterly a fiefdom of Brussels) analogous to Vichy France during World War II and the assembly at Stormont House as a more overt manifestation of "occupation." It quotes Wolfe Tone who said of an urgent need to "break the connection with England, the never-failing source of all our political evils" in calling for the "complete overthrow of British rule in Ireland".

It also refuses to recognise the validity of the Good Friday Agreement as it argues that the referendum on the agreement did not offer the people of Ireland the choice of living in a united Ireland, and that the referendum was invalid since separate polls were held in Northern Ireland and the Republic of Ireland. It also opposes the Northern Ireland Assembly as it believes that this further entrenches British presence in Ireland, and that "those nationalists who took their seats in the new Stormont" were "guilty of treachery to the Irish Republic".

Republican Sinn Féin does not consider the Defence Forces (descended from the pro-Treaty National Army of the Irish Civil War) to be the armed forces of the Irish Republic, rather it claims that the Irish Republican Army is the only organisation that has the right to the title of the Óglaigh na hÉireann. This includes in succession; the Irish Republican Army (1917–22), the Irish Republican Army (1922–69), the Provisional Irish Republican Army (1969–86) and since then the Continuity Irish Republican Army. These organisations are all considered by it to simply be the one Irish Republican Army founded by the merger of the Irish Volunteers and the Irish Citizen Army.

=== Foreign affairs ===
Republican Sinn Féin maintains that Ireland should remain independent of large power blocks and thus is a Eurosceptic party. The people who would go on to found RSF, while they were still members of Provisional Sinn Féin in 1972 opposed Ireland being brought into the European Economic Community, which later became the European Union. RSF in any case does not recognise the Single European Act, Maastricht Treaty, Amsterdam Treaty, Treaty of Nice and Treaty of Lisbon as it applies to Ireland, because these agreements were ratified by what it sees as completely "illegitimate" regimes at Leinster House in Dublin and (for the north) Westminster Palace in London.

In a more general sense, it says there is a "danger of the growing European Union becoming a world superpower in its own right" and that it could be a participant in potential "resource wars" of the 21st century, something it says Ireland cannot support as it would end up "swapping British domination for European domination". It further criticised the EU as taking a "highly centralised political and economic power-bloc" whose decision making is made in what they termed "completely undemocratic institutions"; and that EU bureaucrats work against the interest of small farmers and restructure industry so that the EU centre can prosper at Ireland's expense. Amongst all these issues it said that Ireland's neutrality is under threat.

RSF says that because of Ireland's history as a "colonial possession" it supports other national liberation struggles around the world and "feel[s] a sense of solidarity with all peoples who are struggling for freedom and justice". The party calls itself "internationalist" as it says it recognises that "we all have a common identity as human beings, as members of the great family of peoples [and] we wish to play our role in this wider world community on the basis of equality and respect for the rights of others". In that vein, it supports debt relief for developing countries. It also advocates Ireland's neutrality in avoiding military alliances and power blocs.

=== Cultural policy ===
Other policies of the RSF include the separation of church and state and the importance of the Irish language "to the Irish identity". It is also abstentionist as both the Republic of Ireland and Northern Ireland were created by acts of the British Parliament against what it called the "wishes of the Irish people".

=== Social policy ===
It stands on a platform of the establishment of social justice based on what it describes as the principles of Irish Republican Socialism, based on the 1916 proclamation of an Irish Republic. This is outlined in the party's social and economic policy document Saol Nua. It also has a policy named Éire Nua ("New Ireland"), which would see the establishment of a 32 county Ireland completely independent of the United Kingdom and set up as a federation of the four Irish provinces.

== Leadership ==
At their reorganisation, the Chairman of Republican Sinn Féin was Dáithí Ó Conaill. At the party's first Ard-Fheis, they elected their first president, Ruairí Ó Brádaigh, who had been president of Sinn Féin from 1970 to 1983. He was joined by Dáithí Ó Conaill, another prominent figure in Sinn Féin and the IRA in the 1970s. On 28 September 2009 Ó Brádaigh announced that he was to step down as RSF leader, citing age and health grounds for his decision. On 15 November 2009, he was succeeded by Des Dalton.

On 10 November 2018, Dalton's tenure as president ended after nine years, and Seosamh Ó Maoileoin was announced as the new president of Republican Sinn Féin along with acting vice-presidents Pádraig Garvey and Daire Mac Cionnaith. Líta Ní Chathmhaoil and Dónall Ó Ceallaigh are the general secretaries, and Diarmuid MacDubhghlais and Anthony Donohue are the treasurers. Gearóid Ó Bruachain is the publicity officer.

=== Leadership history ===
Name	Dates	Notes
Ruairí Ó Brádaigh	1986–2009	Longest-served president in the organisation's history.
Des Dalton	2009–2018	
Seosamh Ó Maoileoin	2018–present	

== Publications ==
Saoirse Irish Freedom is the monthly organ of Republican Sinn Féin. It replaced Republican Bulletin, the first issue of which appeared in November 1986 to explain the reasons for the split in Sinn Féin. The name Saoirse Irish Freedom is derived from the 1910–1914 publication Irish Freedom.

Its format was eight A4 pages, continuing monthly until May 1987. In November of that year, Saoirse became an eight-page tabloid. Since then, the paper has been produced as a 16-page monthly magazine. In June 1996 RSF first published an issue online.

== Splits ==
In September 2005, a number of cumainn (or branches) and individual members of RSF left the party in protest over the party's treatment of Continuity IRA prisoners held in Portlaoise Prison. As a consequence of this dispute, a number of people resigned from RSF and formed the Concerned Group for Republican Prisoners to raise funds and provide moral support for the former Continuity IRA-aligned prisoners they supported. However a majority of the prisoners chose to return and the organisation as of 2011 is defunct.

In August 2010 it was reported that members of the Limerick cumann were expelled, and had first adopted the name Limerick Independent Republican Organisation, before changing it to Real Sinn Féin, then simply Republican Sinn Féin, and finally Continuity Sinn Féin. In the following years two opposing groups in Limerick, one loyal to local man Joe Lynch, the other loyal to the leadership in Dublin under Des Dalton, claimed to be the "real" Republican Sinn Féin.

== Relationship to other republican organisations ==
RSF sees itself as forming part of a wider Republican Movement with a number of organisations which share a similar or identical ideological and political perspective. These include (but are not limited to) the Continuity IRA, Cumann na mBan, Fianna Éireann, Cabhair and the National Commemoration Committee and the Republican Prisoners Action Group. Across these organisations there is believed to be some level of dual membership with RSF. RSF strenuously rejects the allegation that it is the "political wing" of the Continuity IRA, as it denies any assertion that the latter is its "military wing".

=== Position of foreign governments ===
Some foreign governments in the Anglosphere have taken a public position against Republican Sinn Féin; the United States State Department lists the party as a "terrorist organisation" along with the Continuity IRA. The State Department states that the CIRA "is a terrorist splinter group formed in 1994 as the clandestine armed wing of Republican Sinn Féin, which split from Sinn Féin in 1986. 'Continuity' refers to the group's belief that it is carrying on the original Irish Republican Army's (IRA) policy of being the army of the Irish Republic. CIRA's alleged aliases, Continuity Army Council and Republican Sinn Féin, were also designated as FTOs." The British government currently lists the Continuity Army Council and the Irish Republican Army as a "terrorist group" under the Terrorism Act 2000, but does not mention Republican Sinn Féin.

== Electoral participation ==
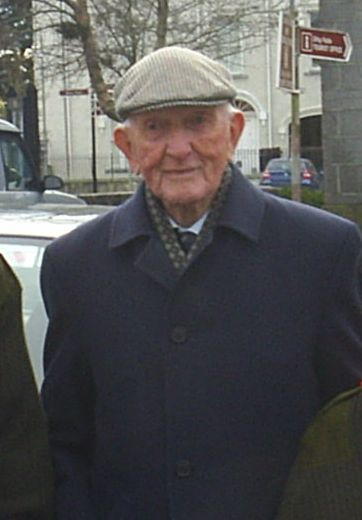
Irish War of Independence veteran and RSF Patron Dan Keating

Though the RSF's policy of abstentionism means that it would not take seats in Dáil Éireann, the Northern Ireland Assembly or the British House of Commons, if elected, it has contested local elections in the Republic and Assembly elections in Northern Ireland in 2007.

=== First elections ===
It initially planned to field 23 candidates, including three sitting councillors elected for Sinn Féin in 1985, in the 1989 local government elections in Northern Ireland. However, shortly before the elections, the British Parliament introduced the 'Elected Authorities (Northern Ireland) Act' which required that all prospective candidates sign the following declaration renouncing:

"(a) any organisation that is for the time being a proscribed organisation specified in Schedule 2 to the Northern Ireland (Emergency Provisions) Act 1978: or
(b) acts of terrorism (that is to say, violence for political ends) connected with the affairs of Northern Ireland".

RSF refused to do so on the grounds that such an oath "calls for the public disowning of the Irish Republican Army, Cumann na mBan, Fianna Éireann and a repudiation of the right of the Irish people to use force of arms to end British occupation". Consequently, its candidates did not stand. It is not registered with the Electoral Commission as a political party in Northern Ireland meaning that in elections in Northern Ireland, the party name cannot appear on the ballot paper, and the party cannot make party political broadcasts.

=== 1991 local elections ===
The results for 1991 are only partially available. A number of other people stood for RSF, including Tomás Ó Curraoin, David Joyce and Frank Glynn in Galway, and Jimmy Kavanagh in Wexford. Two sitting councillors, Joe O'Neill (Bundoran UDC) and Seán Lynch (Longford County Council) were re-elected. Sitting county councillor Frank Glynn lost his seat on Galway County Council which he had held for 24 years.

Among the unsuccessful were Peter Cunningham in South Dublin County Council, Declan Curneen in Leitrim County Council and Joe O'Neill in Donegal County Council.

=== 1999 local elections ===
In the 1999 local elections in the Republic of Ireland, RSF candidates received 1,390 votes in county/city council elections, and 149 votes urban district council level.

Seán Lynch, of Longford County Council, was reelected. The following were unsuccessful: Joe O'Neill Donegal County Council who also lost his seat on the Bundoran Urban District Council, John MacElhinney Letterkenny Urban District Council, Des Long Limerick City Council, Tomás Ó Curraoin Galway County Council and Geraldine McNamara Tipperary Urban District Council.

=== 2004 local elections ===
RSF ran seven candidates in the local elections in the Republic of Ireland. The party's only elected representative lost his seat in the elections. Netting a total of 2,403 first preference votes, the RSF share of the total valid poll (1,819,761) was 0.13 per cent. Unsuccessful candidates were Seán Lynch who lost his seat on Longford County Council, Tomás Ó Curraoin Galway County Council, Seán O'Neill Limerick City Council, Mick Ryan Limerick City Council, Des Dalton Kildare County Council, Terence Varian Midleton Town Council and Donal Varian Cobh Town Council.

=== 2007 Northern Ireland Assembly election ===
It ran six candidates in the 2007 Northern Ireland Assembly election. As the party did not register with the Electoral Commission, the candidates ran as independents. They were Michael McGonigle East Londonderry, Geraldine Taylor West Belfast, Michael McManus Fermanagh and South Tyrone, Joe O'Neill West Tyrone, Brendan McLaughlin Mid Ulster and Barry Toman Upper Bann.

The six candidates netted a total of 2,522 first preference votes, and their share of the total valid poll (690,313) was 0.37 per cent.

=== 2009 local elections results ===
Republican Sinn Féin fielded nine candidates in the 2009 Irish local elections. As the party is not registered, the party's candidates were labelled non-party or independents.

One of the candidates was successful—Tomás Ó Curraoin in the Connemara electoral area for Galway County Council, receiving 1,387 votes or 8.4% of the valid poll. The unsuccessful candidates were Seán Lynch Longford County Council, Mick Ryan and Sean O'Neill Limerick City Council, Des Dalton Athy Town Council, Paddy Kenneally Clare County Council, Peter Fitzsimons Kells Town Council, Séamus Ó Suilleabháin Limerick County Council and Pat Barry Bundoran Town Council.

=== 2014 to 2024 local elections results ===
Republican Sinn Féin Councillor Tomás Ó Curraoin retained his seat in the Connemara electoral area for Galway County Council receiving 1,072 votes (6.36% of the total vote). Pádraig Garvey unsuccessfully ran for election to Kerry County Council receiving 489 votes.

Tomás Ó Curraoin once again retained his seat in the 2019 Galway County Council election, receiving 971 votes (10.8% of the total vote) and being re-elected on the fourth count. Ó Curraoin was also re-elected at the 2024 Galway County Council election, with 974 votes (9.9%).
