= Bécán =

Saint Bécán
- Born: 5th century Ireland
- Residence: Kilbeggan
- Died: 6th century Ireland
- Feast: 5 April

Saint Bécán (or Began, Beggan, Becain; 5th–6th century) was an Irish monk who founded a monastery at Kilbeggan and is considered by some to be one of the Twelve Apostles of Ireland (Note: Becan is mentioned in the biography of Saint Molossus as one of the Twelve Apostles of Ireland, a group of saints who were supposed to have been taught by Saint Finnian of Clonard (died c. 549). However, some of these saints may not have been educated by Finian. Some lived before him or much later, some were taught elsewhere, and some may have been taught at more than one monastery. Clonard Abbey did not have a monopoly on producing important monks and apostles. There are several variants of the list, and Becan is on some of them, but not on the standard list.). His feast day is 5 April.

== Monks of Ramsgate account ==
The monks of St Augustine's Abbey, Ramsgate, wrote in their Book of Saints (1921),

BECAN (BEGAN) (St.) Abbot. (April 5)
(6th cent.) A distinguished Irish Saint connected with Saint Columbkille. He founded a monastery at Kil-Beggan (West Meath), later a Cistercian Abbey of importance. He also gave its name to the church and parish of Emlagh (Meath). He is reckoned as one of the "Twelve Apostles of Ireland."

== Butler's account ==
The hagiographer Alban Butler (1710–1773) wrote in his Lives of the Fathers, Martyrs, and Other Principal Saints, under April 5,

Saint Becan, Abbot, son of Murchade and Cula, of the regal family of Munster, contemporary with King Dermitius and Saint Columb-Kille. In building his church, he worked frequently on his knees, and whilst his hands were employed at his work, he ceased not praying with his lips, his eyes at the same time streaming with tears of devotion. In the life of Saint Molossus he is named among the twelve apostles of Ireland: and in the Festilogium of Ængus, on the 21st of March, he is said to be with Saint Endeus and Saint Mochua, one of the three greatest champions of virtue, and leaders of saints in that fruitful age of holy men. See Colgan, MSS. ad 5 Apr.

== Canon O'Hanlon's account ==
John O'Hanlon (1821–1905) wrote in his Lives of the Irish Saints under Fifth Day of April,

ST. BECAN, AT IMLECH-FIAICH, IN FERA-CUL-BREAGH, NOW EMLAGH, COUNTY OF MEATH. [SIXTH CENTURY.]

The present holy man was distinguished, among the Saints of Ireland. The Martyrology of Tallagh, recording his festival, at this date, calls him St. Begain mic Cule; and, as we are told, the name is thus derived, from his mother. Referring to the same authority, the Bollandists briefly enter, on the 5th of April, Beccanus filius Culae. The same paternity is assigned to him, in the "Feilire" of St. Aengus. He descended from the race of Eoghan Mor, son of Oilioll Oluim, according to the O'Clerys' Calendar.

St. Becan, or Began, is said to have lived contemporaneously with St. Columkille. He founded a monastery, about the close of the sixth or the beginning of the seventh century, at Kilbeggan, a town, situated on the River Brosna.

According to one account, when St. Colum-Cille and the King of Erinn, Diarmait, son of Fergus Cearbheoil, after killing Bresal, his son, came to where Becan was, they found him erecting a fort, with a wet cloak about him, and he praying. The saint felt highly incensed against the monarch, whom he humbled in a miraculous manner; but, afterwards, he relented, owing to the prayers of Columba. However, we cannot find these statements, in the proper Acts of the latter saint.

That locality with which Becan was connected, Imleach Fia, or Imleach Fise, was also denominated Imleach-Becain, from this saint. His old church, at Emlagh, gave name to a parish, so called, and lying in the barony of Lower Kells, towards the north-east of the town of Kells, in the county of Meath. After the Anglo-Norman invasion, Emlagh became a parish church.... The Martyrology of Donegal, on this day, records a festival, in honour of Becan, son of Cula, at Imlech Fiaich, in Fera- Cul-Breagh. The Rev. Alban Butler, and the "Circle of the Seasons," commemorate St. Beacon, Abbot, at the 5th of April. He is noticed, likewise, in the Kalendar of Drummond. At the Nones, corresponding with the present date, the obiit of this holy man being there is recorded.

== Sources ==
- Butler, Alban (1798), The Lives of the Primitive Fathers, Martyrs, and Other Principal Saints, J. Moir This article incorporates text from this source, which is in the public domain.
- Odden, Einar (2009), "Den hellige Becan av Kill-Beggan (500-t)", Den katolske kirke (in Norwegian)
- O'Hanlon, John (1821-1905) (1875), Lives of the Irish Saints : with special festivals, and the commemorations of holy persons, Dublin: J. Duffy This article incorporates text from this source, which is in the public domain.
- St. Augustine's Abbey, Ramsgate (1921), The Book of saints : a dictionary of servants of God canonized by the Catholic Church, London: A. & C. Black, ltd. This article incorporates text from this source, which is in the public domain.
