= Killaly =

Killaly is a surname. Notable people with the surname include:

- Alicia Killaly (1836–1908), Canadian painter
- Hamilton Hartley Killaly (1800–1874), Canadian civil engineer and politician
- John Killaly (1776–1832), Irish civil engineer

== See also ==
- Killaly, Saskatchewan
