= Pollagh =

Village in County Offaly, Ireland

Pollagh Pollach
- Village
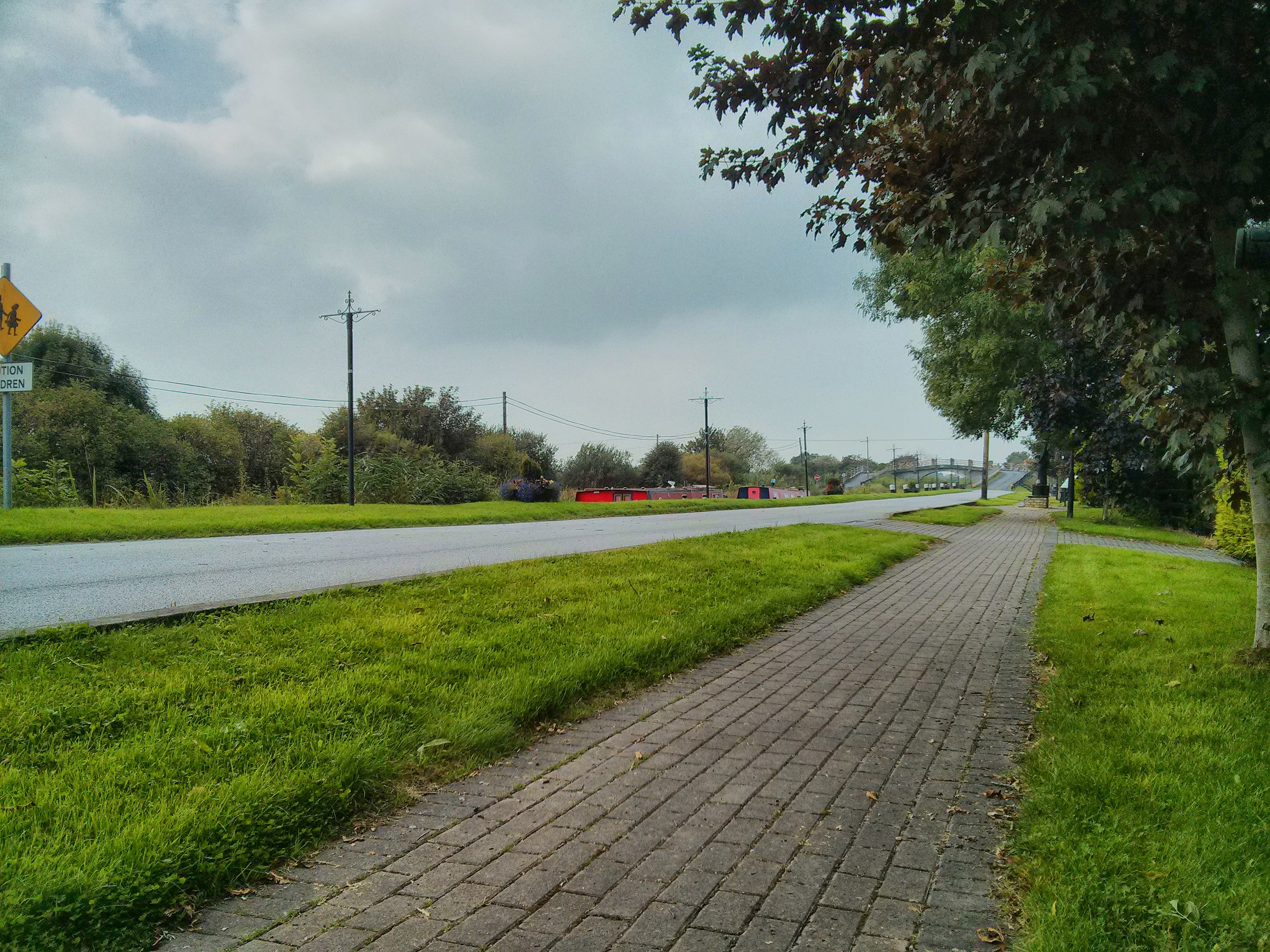
- By the Grand Canal

- Location in Ireland
- Coordinates: 53°16′36″N 7°42′29″W
- Country: Ireland
- Province: Leinster
- County: Offaly
- Elevation: 68 m (223 ft)

Population (2016)
  - Total: 227
- Irish Grid Reference: N185250

Pollagh (Irish: Pollach, meaning 'land full of holes or pits'), also spelled Pullough, is a village in County Offaly, Ireland, located in the midlands of Ireland. It is a rural village on the Grand Canal and lies between Ferbane and Tullamore. (Tullamore is 15 km to the east.) Much of the surrounding area is bogland, and is used to produce fossil fuels such as peat turf. The River Brosna flows close to the village. The Grand Canal was used for transporting peat and bricks produced in the area. Pollagh benefited from the canal in earlier years when it brought investment and employment from Bord na Móna, and it is now a tourist attraction. Pollagh is also known for its church, including its bog oak altar and stained glass windows, designed by the Harry Clarke studios.

== Amenities ==
=== Turraun Nature Reserve ===
The nature reserve at Turraun is based around the former site of Bord na Móna operations in the area. Bord Na Móna produced peat in Turraun, but the plant has long since closed and is now a nature reserve. There is still some evidence of the operations here, such as the railway line, and factory floor. Near the factory ruins there are remnants of a charcoal factory from this period. Much of the bogland that was used for peat production is now under water, as a lake was created to encourage wildlife into the area. The lake is a common location for bird watching, and a wooden hut allows for a discreet view of the lake. A gravel road runs through the reserve leading eventually to further lakes, a heritage site, and onwards to Lough Boora. Lough Boora has been developed as a tourist attraction including environmental sculptures and a Mesolithic site containing evidence of dwellings. The Bog of Allen surrounding the area is the largest example of raised bog in Ireland. Peat production has slowed since the closing of the Ferbane power station, and people changing to other forms of heat production.

=== St. Mary's Church ===
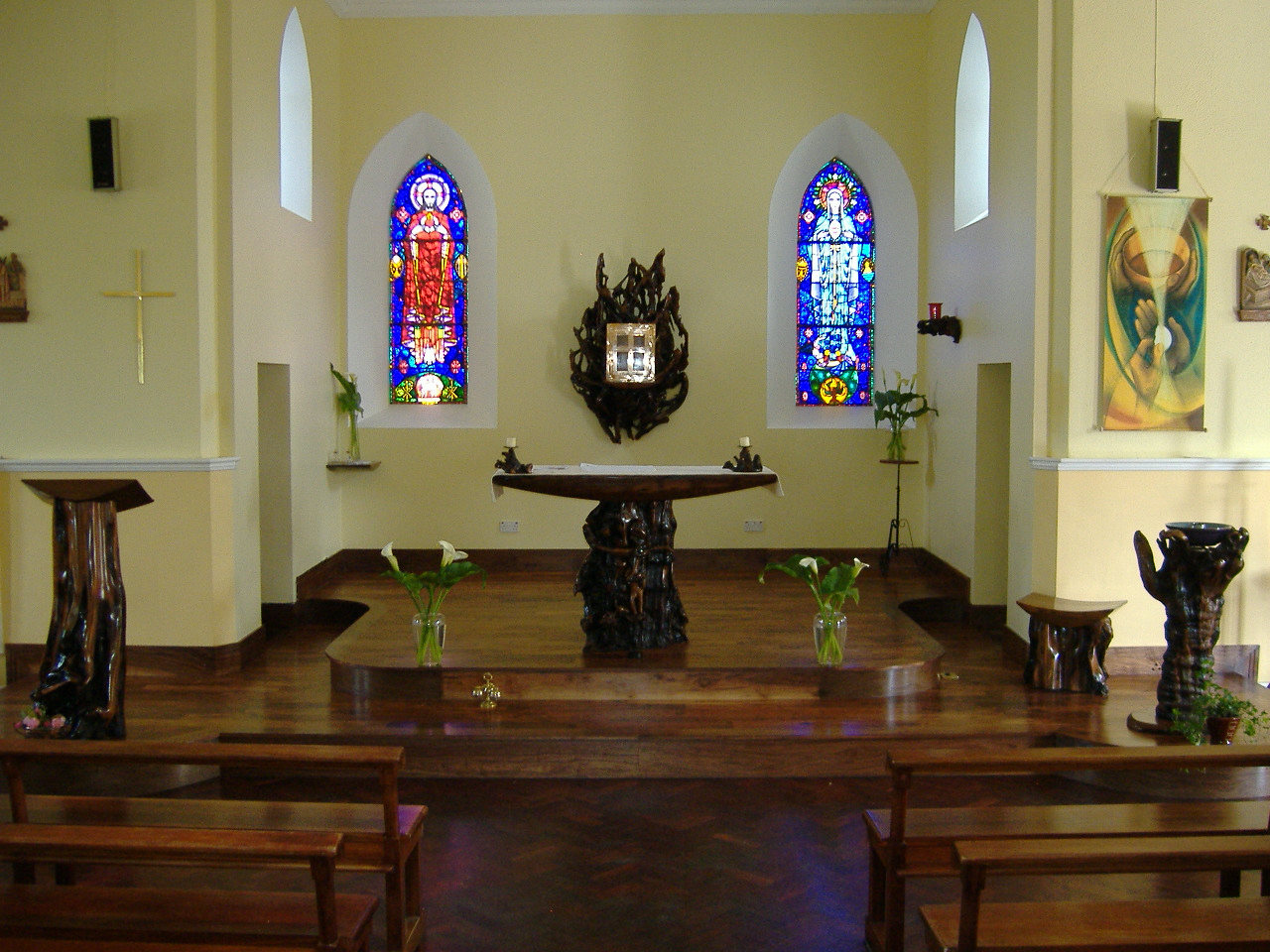
St Mary's Church has a bog oak (elm) altar and stained glass windows from the Harry Clarke studio

The local church, dedicated to St. Mary, was built in 1907 and is still in use today. Pollagh is in the Ballinahown parish, consisting of Ballinahown, Boher and Pollagh Churches. Inside the church, the altar, backed by two large stained glass windows, faces the door. The shape of the church is somewhat unusual, resembling an inverted "V", with the sanctuary at its point. The church is divided by a central aisle, which was used to divide the congregation into men and women, but now there is no evidence of this partition remaining. The stained glass windows of the Harry Clarke studio were installed in 1936 and depict the Blessed Virgin and the Sacred Heart. Between the two windows is the tabernacle, which was part of the bog oak work, including the altar, seat and pulpit. The altar depicts Jesus on the front facing the congregation with his arms outstretched, as on the cross. In 2007, the carpet surrounding the altar was replaced with wood in preparation for the celebration of mass live on Irish television channel RTÉ One.

=== Canal ===
The canal runs from Dublin to Shannon Harbour in Offaly. The stretch of the canal that Pollagh is on was opened in 1804. The canal is separated by locks, allowing for a drop in height of the surrounding land. Pollagh is built on the longest stretch between locks on the canal. The canal divides Pollagh in two, and the Plunkett Bridge, built in 1809, is the only bridge in the nearby area that allows for passage across the canal. It is peculiar in shape, resembling an 'n', meaning that a driver must make two sharp turns at the peak of the bridge.

The Street, Pollagh View of canal through Pollagh taken from Plunkett Bridge

== See also ==
- List of towns and villages in Ireland
