= John Killaly =

Irish civil engineer, specialist in canals

John Killaly (1776–1832) was the most significant Irish canal engineer working originally for the Grand Canal company and later, as an engineer, under the Directors-General of Inland Navigation.

== Career ==
The name Killaly is rare and associated with the county of Offaly, but no record of his parentage or birthplace has been discovered and it is possible that he was born and educated in England. In around 1791 Killaly started carrying out some surveys for the Grand Canal. By 1794 he had made such an impression on the directors that he was asked to join the company at a salary of £150 per annum. By 1796 they reported that from being 'a mere measurer and surveyor' he had become 'the complete superintendent of all kinds of work'. He took on the most difficult stretch of the canal, across the Bog of Allen close to Edenderry, which at John Smeaton's suggestion had been built high across the surface of the bog. William Jessop had attempted to stem the water leakage by using 'ribs of clay' and eventually one of the directors of the company, Richard Griffith, challenged this approach and Killaly adopted a much more gentle profile that stabilized the canal, though it was to remain a problem. For the extension from Tullamore to Shannon Harbour another bog had to be crossed near the river Brosna, and this time Killaly carried out extensive drainage works over several years along the line of the canal and allowed the land to subside before excavating the canal.

By this time he had become the company's chief with a salary of around £800. On the opening of the canal in 1803 he became an engineer under the Directors-General of Inland Navigation, whilst still receiving a reduced salary from the Grand Canal company until 1810. In 1805, he was sent on a six-week fact finding tour of engineering works in England and Wales, reporting on canals, bridges, docks and rail roads. On his resignation in 1810 the Board recorded that Killaly had 'conducted himself with the most unwearied assiduity and the most perfect and unimpeached integrity' during his service to the company.

Together with John Brownrigg, he inspected the state of the River Shannon Navigation and made a comprehensive report to the Directors with a number of proposals for action on the upper part. He supervised the construction of lateral canals at Athlone and Meelick. He also advised on the Corrib, Lagan, Newry and Suir navigations. He surveyed an extension to the Royal Canal to Lough Allen but by this time the Royal Canal Co was in financial trouble and was declared bankrupt in 1813, leaving the Directors-General to complete the line to the Shannon. Killaly resurveyed the route from the summit west of Mullingar to a new entry into the Shannon using the Camlin River. This was let as a single contract and completed substantially on time and within budget in 1817, including a major aqueduct across the River Inny. In 1814 he surveyed the line of a canal to connect Lough Erne with Lough Neagh. The plan was approved and the Ulster Canal Co was eventually formed in 1825 to undertake construction, though he was instructed to resurvey it to cut costs.

In 1823, he was asked to re-examine his plans for an extension of the Grand Canal to Ballinasloe in County Galway and offered to act as Directing Engineer on condition that his son, Hamilton be appointed as superintending engineer. He used his experience of driving through bogs by driving a drainage channel along the centreline of the canal with similar and interconnecting drains at 25 and 60m on each side with transverse drains. In this way a uniform settlement was achieved over a wide area, avoiding the need for high embankments.

Between 1820 and 1826, Killaly was seconded by the government to deal with some 88 miles of road improvements to provide employment in Clare, parts of Limerick, Galway, Mayo and Roscommon, including numerous bridges. At times he was responsible for more than 9,000 workers in these famine relief schemes. Reporting in 1822, Killaly said "the great destruction of morals and waste of public property which have taken place in the county of Clare from this cause (jobbing) is beyond my power to calculate" and in 1830 he expressed the hope that the presentment system would be eradicated.

== Family ==
In 1799, Killaly married Alicia Hamilton, a daughter of George Hamilton, the owner of the principal flour mill on the Tullamore River. In 1804, Killaly leased the mill property from him at an annual rent of the £300 and moved into the Mill House, with his growing family, which eventually numbered four sons and three daughters. Three of his sons (Hamilton Hartley, Richard Griffith and Benjamin) later graduated from the University of Dublin and two of them became civil engineers like their father. Hamilton Hartley Killaly emigrated to Canada and became an engineer on the Welland Canal and later the first Chairman and Chief Engineer of the Board of Works for Lower Canada. His son became the first president of the Canadian Society of Civil Engineers in 1887.

On his death in 1832 a large memorial was erected by his widow in St. Patrick's Cathedral, Dublin.
