= Kilbeggan Racecourse =

Horse racing venue in Kilbeggan, Ireland

Kilbeggan Racecourse is a horse racing venue in Kilbeggan, County Westmeath, Ireland. The first recording of racing in the Kilbeggan area was in March 1840. The course is located 13 miles (21 km) from the nearest, larger town of Mullingar and 57 miles (92 km) from the capital city of Dublin. The presence of the M6 motorway means that the course is reachable from Dublin in approximately one hour. The race meetings in Kilbeggan begin in mid-May and finish in mid-September.

The course is a right-handed, undulating course of one mile and one furlong with an uphill run to the finish.

Its feature race is the Midlands National, ran in July.
