= Kilbeggan =

Town in County Westmeath, Ireland

Kilbeggan Irish: Cill Bheagáin
- Town
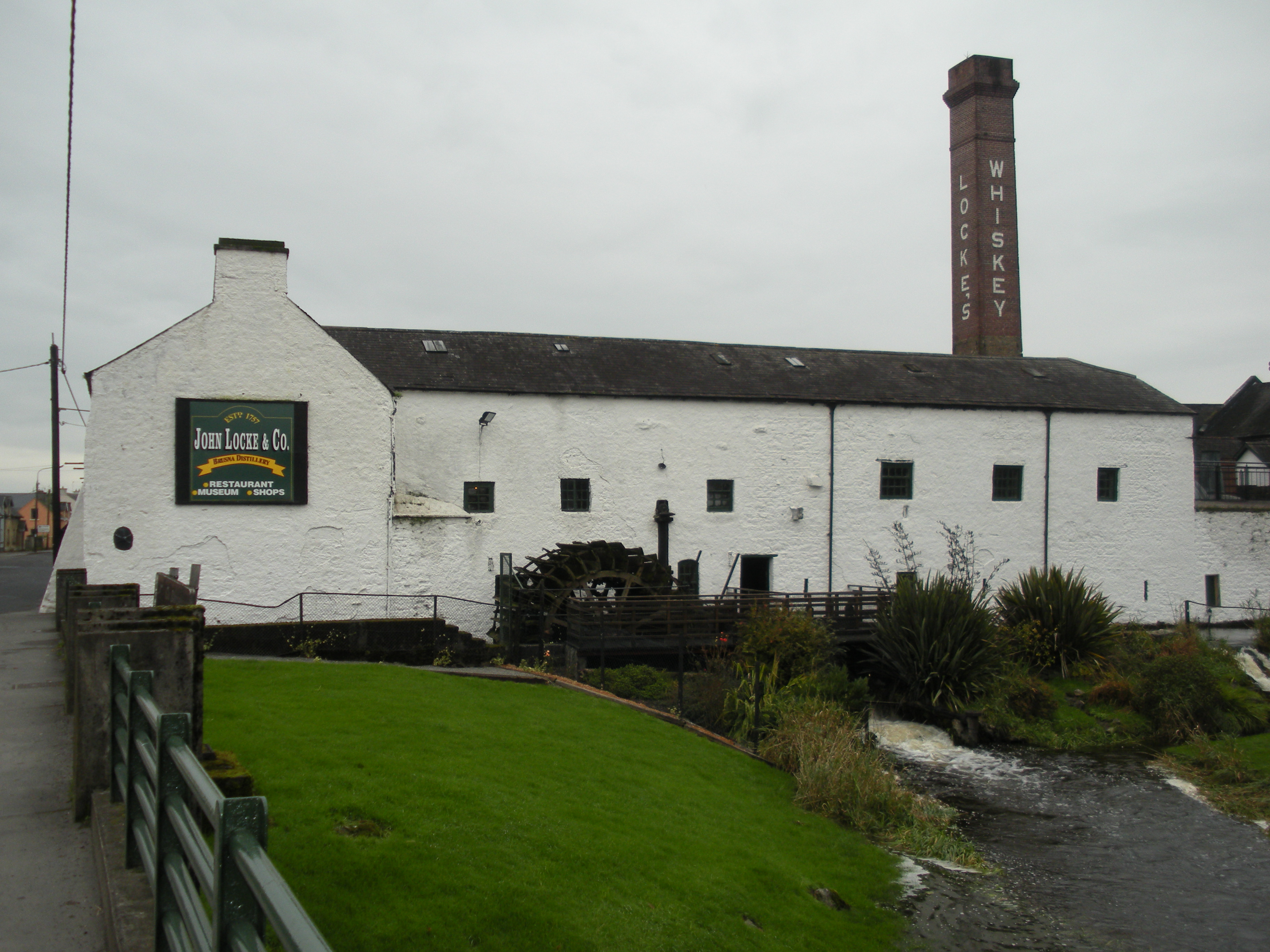
- Kilbeggan Distillery

- Location in Ireland
- Coordinates: 53°21′49″N 7°29′55″W
- Country: Ireland
- Province: Leinster
- County: County Westmeath
- Dáil Éireann: Longford–Westmeath
- EU Parliament: Midlands–North-West
- Elevation: 69 m (226 ft)

Population (2022)
  - Total: 1,575
- Irish Grid Reference: N330357

Kilbeggan (Irish: Cill Bheagáin, meaning 'church of Bécán') is a town in County Westmeath, Ireland.

== Geography ==
Kilbeggan is situated on the River Brosna, in the south of County Westmeath. It lies south of Lough Ennell, and Castletown Geoghegan, north of the boundary with County Offaly, ten kilometres north of Tullamore. Kilbeggan is surrounded by the gently rolling Esker Riada, the linear sand hills that stretch across the Irish midlands, which were left by retreating glaciers at the end of the last ice age. It is famous as the location of the oldest recorded incidence of a tornado in Europe.

Kilbeggan comprises 29 townlands: Aghamore, Aghuldred, Ardnaglew, Ballinderry Big, Ballinderry Little, Ballinwire, Ballymacmorris, Ballynasudder, Ballyoban, Brownscurragh, Camagh, Clonaglin, Coola, Demesne or Mearsparkfarm, Grange and Kiltober, Grangegibbon, Greenan, Guigginstown, Hallsfarm, Kilbeggan, Kilbeggan North, Kilbeggan South, Kiltober / Kiltubber and Grange, Loughanagore, Meadowpark, Meeldrum, Meeniska, Meersparkfarm or Demesne, Shureen and Ballynasuddery, Skeahanagh, Stonehousefarmand Tonaphort.

The neighbouring civil parishes are: Castletown Kindalen to the north, Newtown to the east, Rahugh to the east and south, Durrow to the south and Ardnurcher or Horseleap to the west.

== Transport ==
The N6 - the main route between Dublin and Galway - originally passed through Kilbeggan, meeting the N52 in the town centre. Both the N6 and N52 have been re-routed to bypass the town to the south, with the road through the centre now reclassified as the R446 regional road. Kilbeggan being situated on the main Dublin-Galway route means it has public transport options to these main cities. A townlink service also connects the main surrounding towns such as Mullingar and Tullamore. It is the first Westmeath town that Kearns transport stops in en route to Dublin.

The Kilbeggan - Ballycommon greenway, part of the planned Kilbeggan–Mullingar Greenway, opened in February 2022.

== History ==
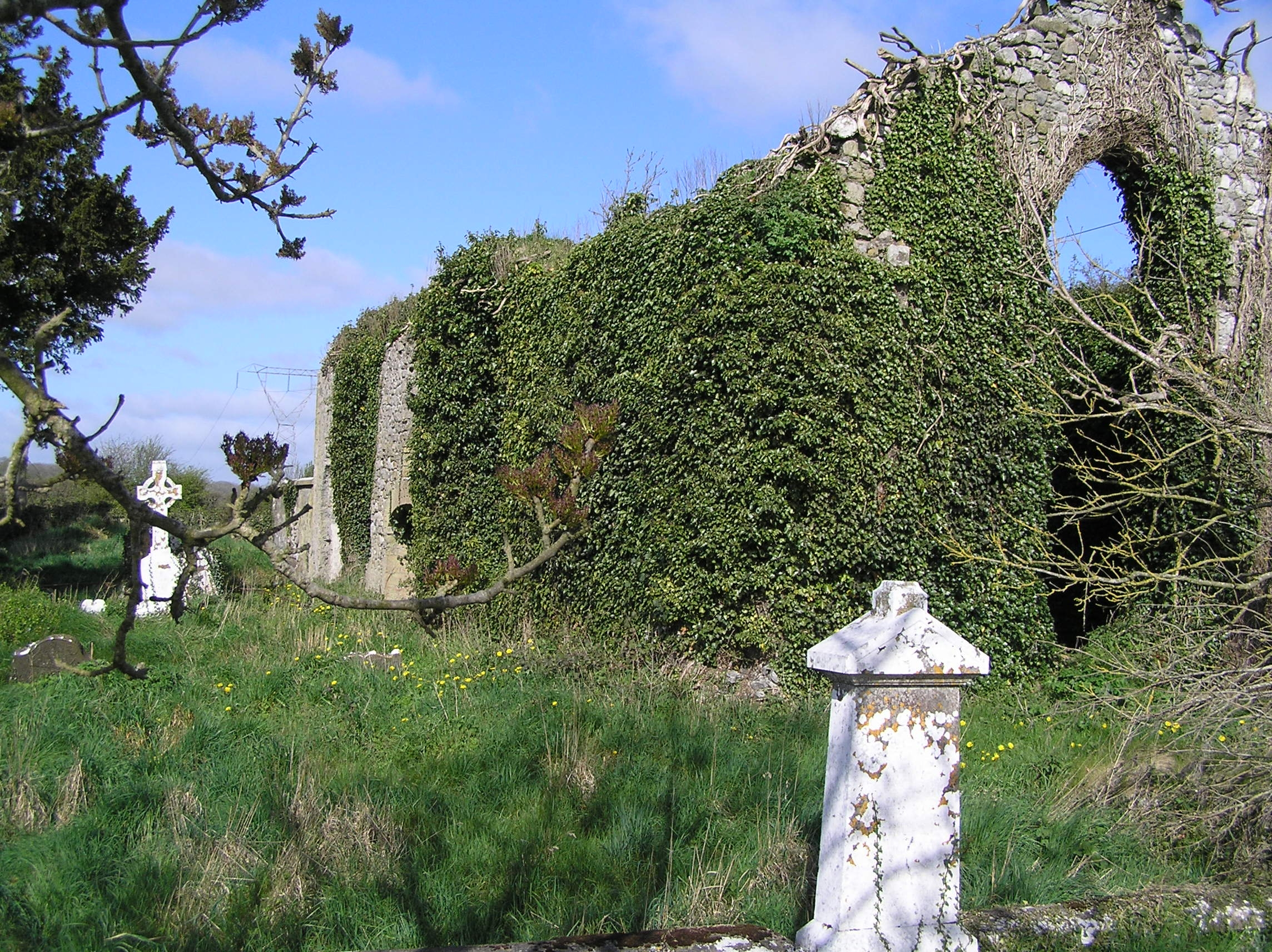
Ruined church at Newtownlow

St Bécán, one of the 'Twelve Apostles of Ireland', founded a monastery here in the 6th century, giving rise to the town's Irish name Cill Bheagáin, meaning "the church of St Bécán". In time the monastery fell into disuse and disrepair. A new monastery was founded on the site in 1150, by a member of the Mac Loghlan family, the ruins of the previous one having been rebuilt by the Dalton family. It was subsequently home to Cistercian monks from Mellifont Abbey. The great priest of Clonmacnois, O'Catharnaigh (O'Kearney), died at the monastery in 1196 and Hugh O'Malone, Bishop of Clonmacnois, was buried there in 1236. In 1217 the monastery was involved in the riot of Jerpoint, and the abbot was punished as a result. Following the Conspiracy of Mellifont, the monastery was made subject to Buildwas Abbey. After its dissolution in 1539, the monastery and its extensive lands were granted to the Lambart family. The monastery was subsequently totally demolished and its location was lost. However, the location and full plan of the monastery were uncovered by geophysical survey by Archaeological Projects in 2003 west of the early-medieval graveyard (Hayden 2003). A later parish church was built northeast of the early medieval church and served as the parish church for the reformed Church of Ireland. The church is no longer in use. The tower survives, in a ruinous state.

A ford crossing the River Brosna at Kilbeggan was the site, in 972, of a battle between the Danes and the Irish. A skirmish led by the United Irishmen took place in the town, as part of the Irish Rebellion of 1798

The Lambart family came to be politically dominant in the midlands. They firmly established themselves in and around Kilbeggan, gradually replacing the Geoghegan Family who were the leaders of Moycashel and the formidable Irish of (West) Meath Alliance who kept the English of (East) Meath in check from the Norman Invasion through the War of the Three Kingdoms, during which they sat as members for the two county Westmeath boroughs, and after The Restoration were restored to some land up to the ultimate defeat of the Irish by William and Mary's forces and allies and the Treaty of Limerick.

Sir Oliver Lambart was made Governor of Connaught in 1601 upon the completion of the Tudor Conquest and the last great battle for a Gaelic Ireland at Kinsale, where Bryan Geoghegan and his small band was the great holdout at Dunboy. At payback time Lambart was charged with curbing the intransigent Geoghegans and their allies and was subsequently granted plan for a model Tudor 700 acres (2.8 km^{2}) of land and 60 houses. Lambart inaugurated a weekly market in the town in 1606. Kilbeggan became a borough town by charter of James I in 1612. Kilbeggan's market became important to the surrounding agricultural community. The substantial market house still stands in the town, though no longer used for its original purpose.

Kilbeggan Distillery, standing on the banks of the River Brosna, commenced whiskey production in 1757. Within the distillery complex, the owner constructed a house and gardens on an island in the river. A member of the Locke family established the Convent of Mercy in the town in 1879.

A branch of the Grand Canal, between Dublin and the River Shannon, served the town, opening in 1835. The inhabitants of Kilbeggan have been attempting to have the Kilbeggan branch of the Grand canal restored at the junction of Murphy's bridge to Kilbeggan harbour.

Rostella (Rosdalla), 3 km south of Kilbeggan is the site of the earliest recorded tornado in Europe, which occurred on 30 April 1054.

Kilbeggan is in the historical barony of Moycashel.

== Amenities ==
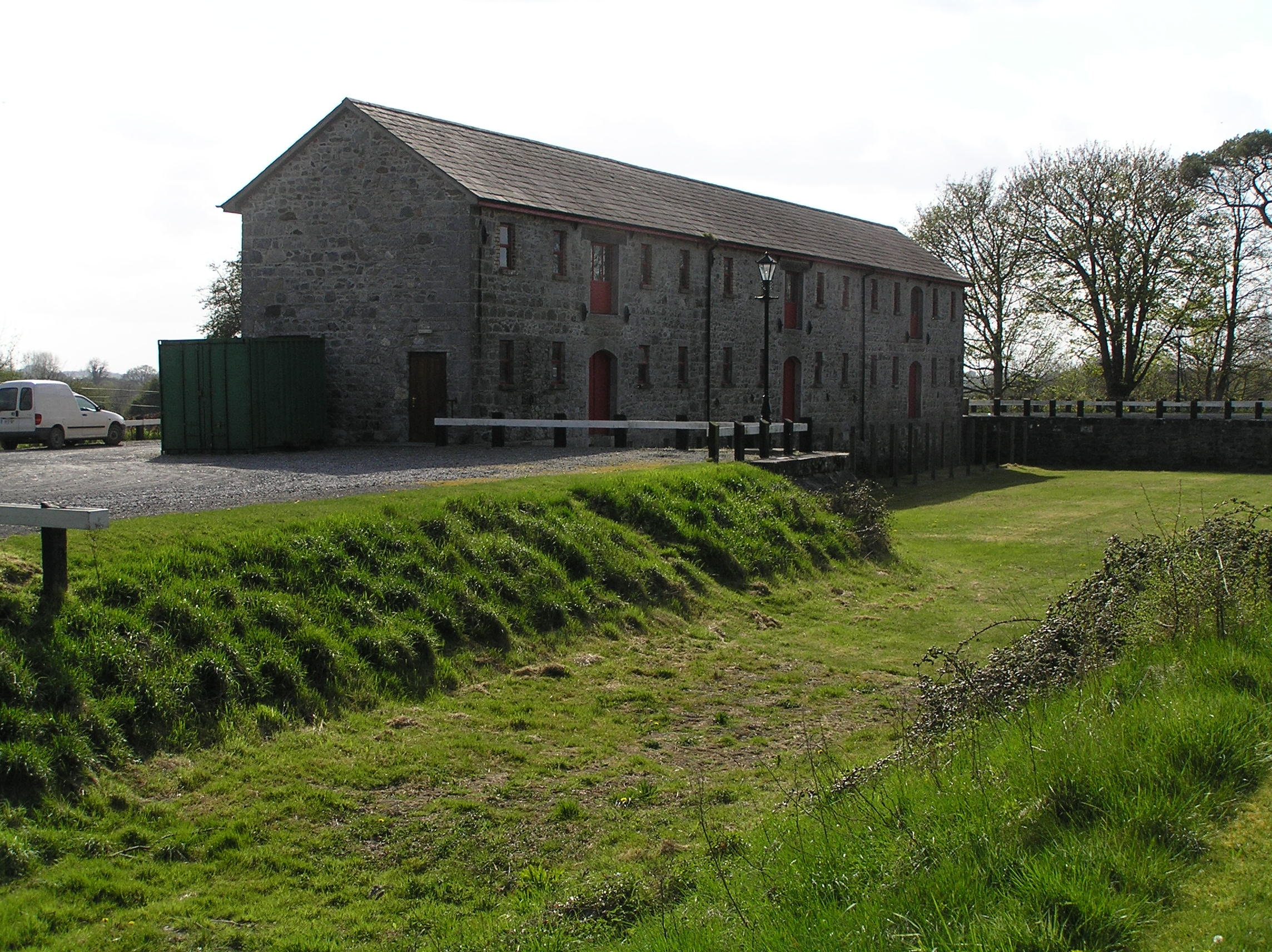
Kilbeggan canal basin

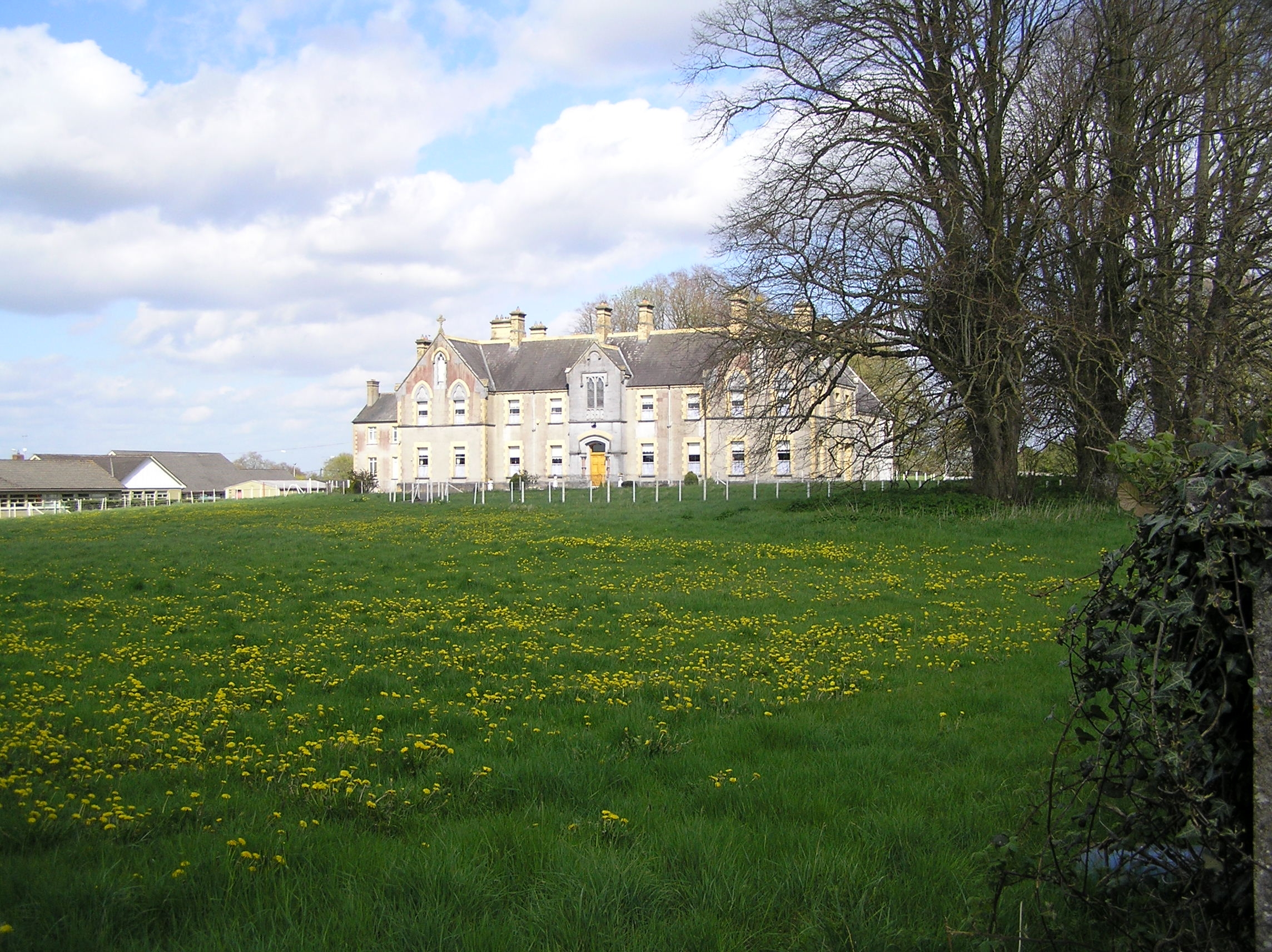
Mercy Convent, Kilbeggan

The town serves as a service centre for the local farming community; hosts some light industry, including sand and gravel extraction in the surrounding area. It is increasingly seen as a Dublin commuter town, particularly since the improvement of the N6/M6 and the extension of the M4 motorway west of the city.

The canal branch closed in the 1960s and the basin is now dry. The harbour buildings, however, have survived and are now in use as offices and workspace.

Although whiskey production ended at Locke's Distillery in the 1950s, the buildings survived and were reopened as a visitor attraction. Distillation has recently recommenced.

Kilbeggan Racecourse is around 1 kilometre north of the town. It is Ireland's only all-National Hunt course.

Kilbeggan is home to Mercy Secondary School, which stands on the Dublin Road. It is linked to the Mercy Convent, situated in the town.

Durrow Abbey is located around 4 kilometres south of the town, just across the county boundary with Offaly.

Kilbeggan is home to a significant Brazilian diaspora community, and possesses a shop offering ethnic Brazilian goods and money transfer services.

== Events ==
The 'Kilbeggan Knighthood Festival' takes place during the first weekend in June and commemorates the knighting of Thomas Cuffe, a local innkeeper that was knighted by Lord Townshend after a night of drinking in 1772. During this weekend, various activities take place such as parades, a market in the square and reenactment events.

== People ==
- Kate O'Connell, former Fine Gael TD for Dublin Bay South, was born in Kilbeggan.
- Kitty Flynn, historian and author.

== See also ==
- List of towns and villages in Ireland
- Market Houses in Ireland
