= Grand Canal (Ireland) =

Canal in Ireland

Coordinates: 53°19′51″N 6°17′08″W

Grand Canal An Chanáil Mhór
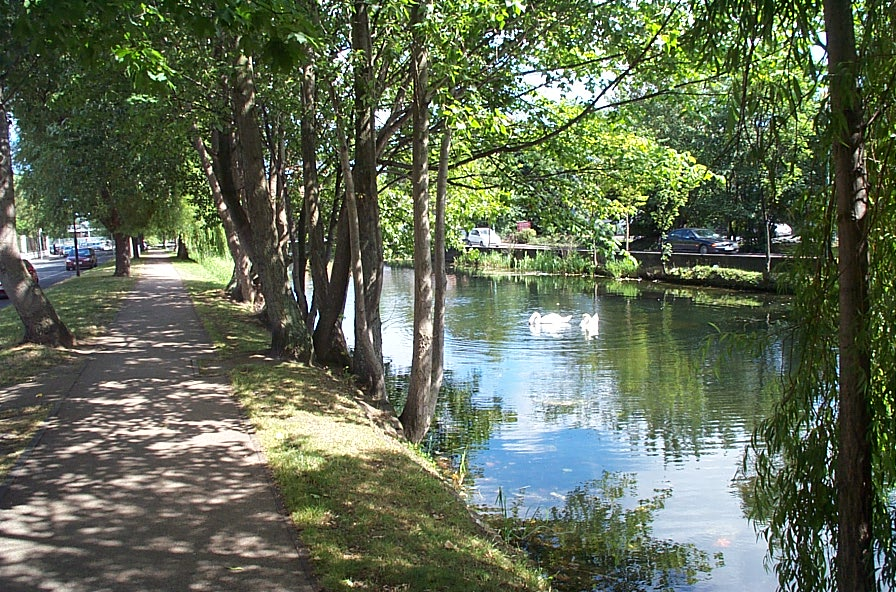
- The Grand Canal in Dublin
- Interactive map of Grand Canal; An Chanáil Mhór

Specifications
- Length: 132 km (82 miles)
- Locks: 43
- Status: Open
- Navigation authority: Waterways Ireland

History
- Construction began: 1756
- Date completed: 1804

Geography
- Start point: Shannon Harbour
- End point: Grand Canal Dock
- Connects to: River Shannon

The Grand Canal (Irish: An Chanáil Mhór) is the southernmost of a pair of canals that connect Dublin, in the east of Ireland, with the River Shannon in the west, via Tullamore and a number of other villages and towns, the two canals nearly encircling Dublin's inner city. Its sister canal on the Northside of Dublin is the Royal Canal. The last working cargo barge passed through the Grand Canal in 1960.

== Branches ==
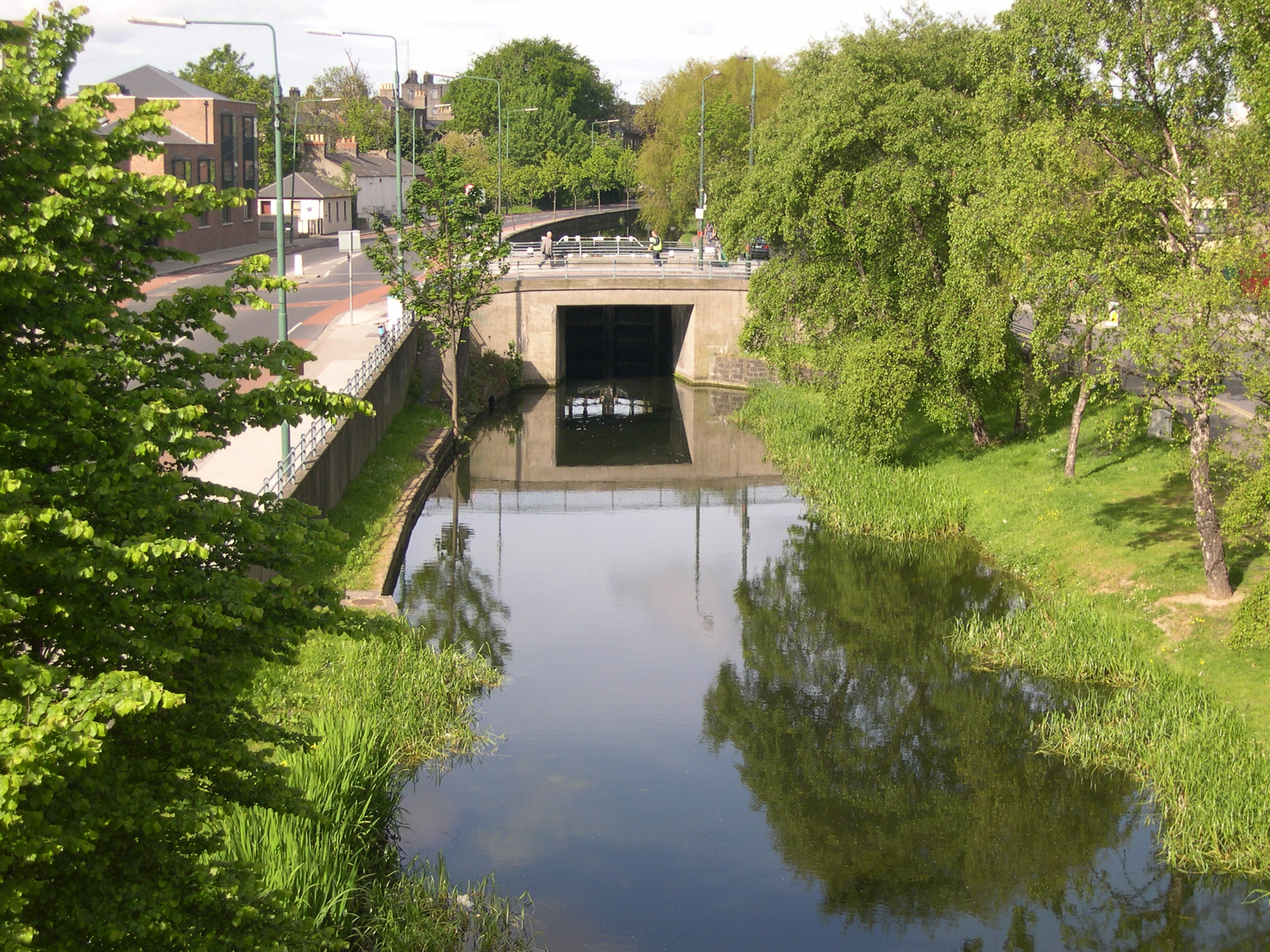
View from the green line Luas bridge

- Main line from Grand Canal Harbour near St. James's Gate to Shannon Harbour in County Offaly.
  - Most of the Dublin City section of the route is now used by the Luas. While this section was in use, the canal from Crumlin to the Liffey in Ringsend Basin, which forms part of the current main line, was considered to be a branch. It was a later add-on and was known as the Circular Line.
- Naas/Corbally
  - Navigable to Naas, but a low bridge prevents access to Corbally
- Barrow, joining the River Barrow at Athy
- Milltown feeder
- The Mountmellick Line, which left the Barrow Line at Monasterevin and passed through Portarlington (abandoned)
- Blackwood feeder (abandoned)
- Lough Boora feeder (abandoned)
- Kilbeggan (abandoned)
- Ballinasloe (starting on the far side of the River Shannon from Shannon Harbour; abandoned and now used by Bord na Móna industrial railway)

== History ==
The idea of connecting Dublin to the Shannon was proposed as early as 1715, but development was not initiated until 1751, when the Board of Inland Navigation was formed by an act of Parliament, 25 Geo. 2.

In 1757, the Irish Parliament granted Thomas Omer £20,000 to start construction of a canal. By 1759 he reported that 3 km (1.9 mi) in the Bog of Allen and 13 km (8.1 mi) of canal from the River Liffey near Sallins towards Dublin were complete. By 1763 he had completed three locks and six bridges towards Dublin and was concentrating on establishing a water supply from the Morell River near Sallins. At this point, the Corporation of Dublin realised that the canal could be used to improve the water supply to the city via the city basin, and put up the money to complete the canal into the city. But when the canal was filled, the banks gave way and the city did not obtain its water. By 1768, £77,000 had been spent on the project and little more was forthcoming.

=== Grand Canal Company ===
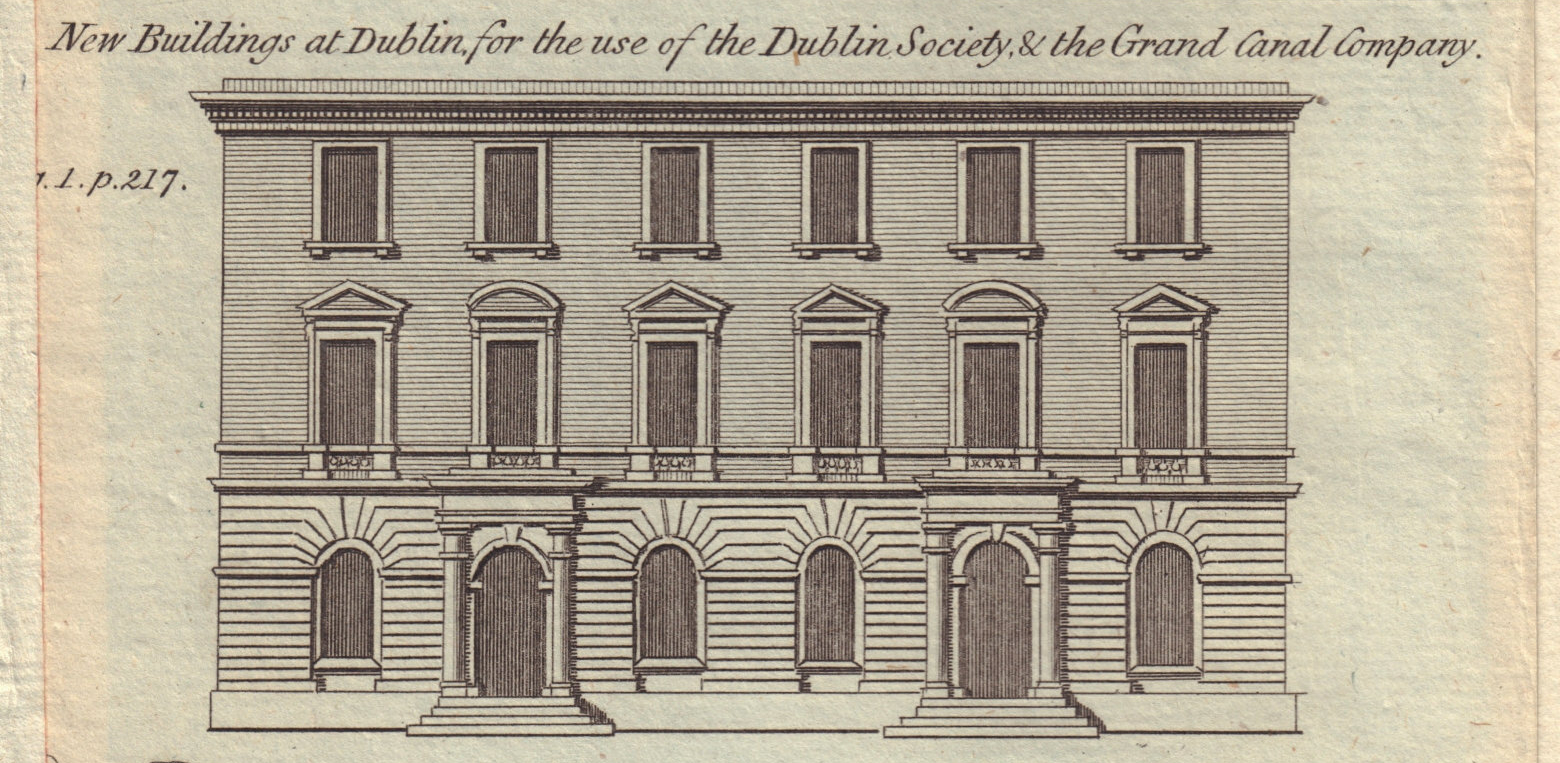
Offices of the Grand Canal Company at 114 Grafton Street which was often called Navigation House.

In 1772, the Grand Canal Company was established by a group of noblemen and merchants, including public subscription, to ensure the future of the canal and to tackle the biggest barrier to its construction, the Bog of Allen. This was a new venture for canals. The company invited John Smeaton and his assistant William Jessop to Ireland for two weeks to advise them. Smeaton made a recommendation to skirt round the bog but to build the canal at the full height, in contrast to Omer's efforts which attempted to drain parts of the bog and build at a lower level. This was to prove an expensive mistake, although he also advised reducing the generous locks that Omer had built (42m by 6 m / 137 ft by 20 ft) to 18m by 4m (60 ft by 14 ft), which would bring about considerable savings in the total cost of the canal.

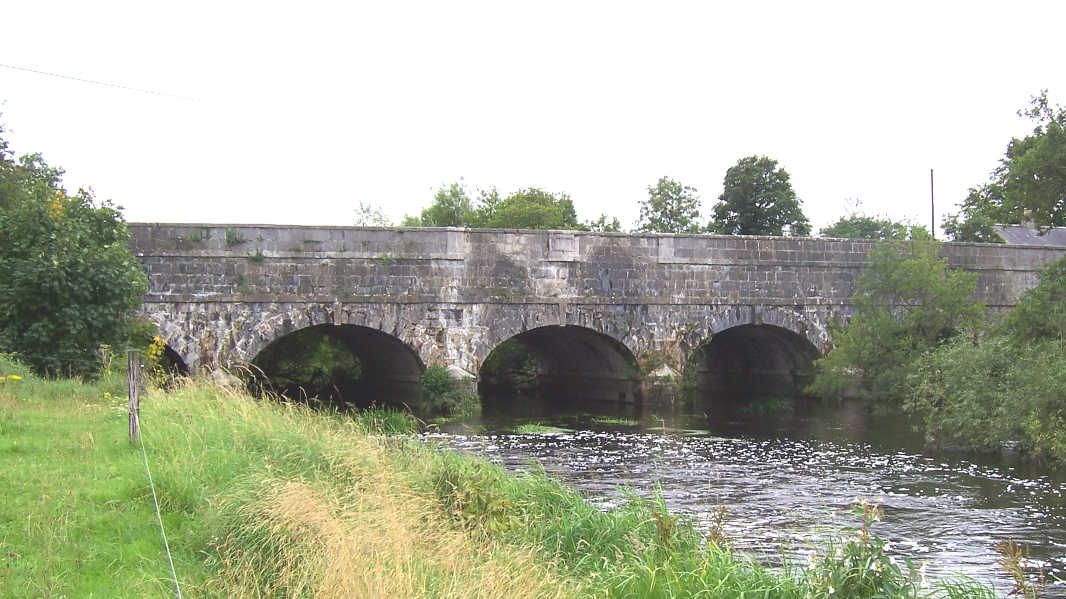
Leinster Aqueduct over the Liffey

The canal from Sallins was finally opened to traffic in 1779 and a twice-weekly passenger service from Sallins to Dublin started in 1780. The canal was extended to Robertstown in 1784, including the Leinster Aqueduct across the Liffey, constructed by Richard Evans, and to a junction with the River Barrow at Athy by 1791.

Samuel Watson's "The Gentleman's and Citizen's Almanack" for the year 1792, included a list of the passage boats available to the public on the Grand Canal departing from the Canal Harbour at James's Street. Stage coaches linking the cities of Limerick and Kilkenny with canal boats at Monasterevin were also advertised.

The "Circle Line" through Dublin from Portobello to Ringsend, where large docks adjacent to the Liffey were constructed, was started in 1790 and opened in 1796. The company had by then turned its attention to completing the link with the Shannon. Getting across the Bog of Allen took more than five years of struggle under the guidance of Jessop, who attempted to use walls of clay to support the walls of the canal. Though the canal was opened to Daingean (then Philipstown) in 1797, serious breaches occurred and Jessop was forced to abandon this method. The continuation to the Shannon then continued under the leadership of John Killaly, who succeeded in crossing another bog by carrying out drainage works for several years before construction. The work was substantially completed in 1803, but because of leakages and a dry summer the official opening had to be delayed until April 1804. The canal had taken 47 years to build, advancing at a rate of 7.7 metres per day.

The whole work had cost in the region of £877,000, and it was some years before it began to make a profit, although regular dividends had been paid to shareholders. Trade increased from 100,000 tons in 1800 to double that in 1810. Revenues from passenger boats also increased to £90,000 by that date. (The novel The Kellys and the O'Kellys (1848) by Anthony Trollope includes a description of a tedious journey by passenger flyboat from Portobello to Ballinasloe.) But the long saga had prompted a rival venture, the Royal Canal, which started construction in 1790 and was finally opened in 1817 after the government had stepped in to resolve disputes between the two companies.

The first steamer to traverse the canal from Dublin to Limerick was the Shannon Steam Navigation Company's wood paddle steamer Mountaineer, which received the Canal Company's permission to proceed in October 1826. The second was the Dublin and Wexford Steam Company's iron paddle steamer Marchioness Wellesley, which arrived in Limerick on 2 February 1827.

Apart from the breaches during construction, there were breaches on a branch of the canal in 1833, due to which one child drowned, and another in 1846. In 1855 the main canal breached at the same location as in 1797. In 1916 again 300 yards of the canal were displaced. The last breach was on 15 January 1989, between the Blundell Aqueduct and Downshire bridge. 18 miles of canal drained into the surroundings.

In the 1960s, Dublin was suffering from traffic congestion and Dublin Corporation had plans to drain the canal and replace it with a 6-lane dual-carriageway, according to Karl Schaechterle's General Traffic Plan (1965). The plans were met with opposition and a petition of 100,000 signatures against the proposal, and eventually abandoned.

== Route ==
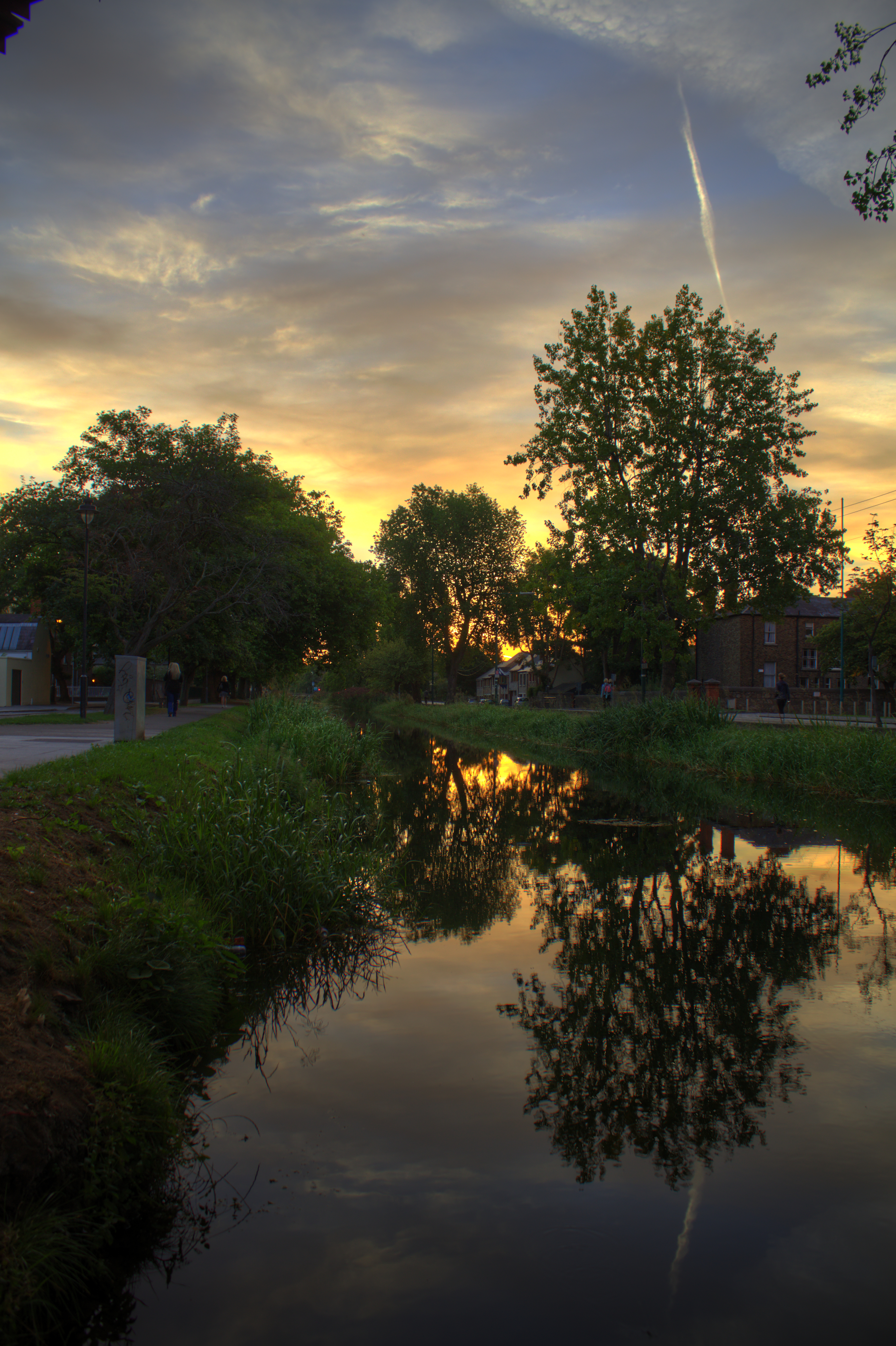
The Grand Canal in Dublin, near Charlemont

The Grand Canal begins in Grand Canal Dock at the River Liffey, and continues through to the River Shannon. It passes through Ringsend and traverses the southside, delineating the northern extremities of Ballsbridge, Ranelagh, Rathmines, Harolds Cross and Crumlin. This section, known as the Circular Line (or Circle Line), has seven locks. The path of the original main line, which serviced the Grand Canal Harbour, the City Basin (reservoir) and Guinness brewery, can be seen at Rialto. Most of the route of this line now runs alongside the Luas Red Line.

From Suir Road Bridge, the lock numbering starts again at 1 as the canal heads west through the suburbs of Dublin West and into County Kildare. At Sallins the Naas/Corbally branch diverts southwards, while the Grand Canal continues west passing Caragh, Prosperous and Robertstown, its highest point. Just outside Sallins, the canal passes over the River Liffey at the Leinster Aqueduct. Just east of Robertstown is the location where the Blackwood Feeder used to join the canal, whilst just to the west can be found the busiest junction on the canal where the Old Barrow Line, Milltown Feeder and the entrances to the Athy & Barrow Navigation meet. Further west, the canal passes Edenderry, Tullamore, Rahan and Pollagh before it reaches the Shannon at Shannon Harbour in County Offaly. In total the main line of the canal is 131 kilometres (81 mi) with 43 locks, five of which are double locks.

== Disasters ==
In December 1792, there was a major accident on the Grand Canal. A passage boat left Dublin bound for Athy. It seems that one hundred and fifty people, many of them drunk, forced their way onto a barge, in spite of the captain warning them that the boat would capsize if they did not leave. Near the eighth lock, five men, four women and two children drowned when the boat capsized. The rest of the passengers escaped.

On the evening of Saturday, 6 April 1861 in Portobello Harbour, a horse-drawn bus, driven by Patrick Hardy, had just dropped a passenger on the canal when one of the horses started to rear. The horses backed the bus through the wooden rails of the bridge. The bus, horses and six passengers inside the bus, plunged into the cold waters and drowned. The conductor was able to jump clear and the driver was pulled from the water by a passing policeman.

In July 2024, two homeless men were recovered from the canal having drowned.

== Ownership ==
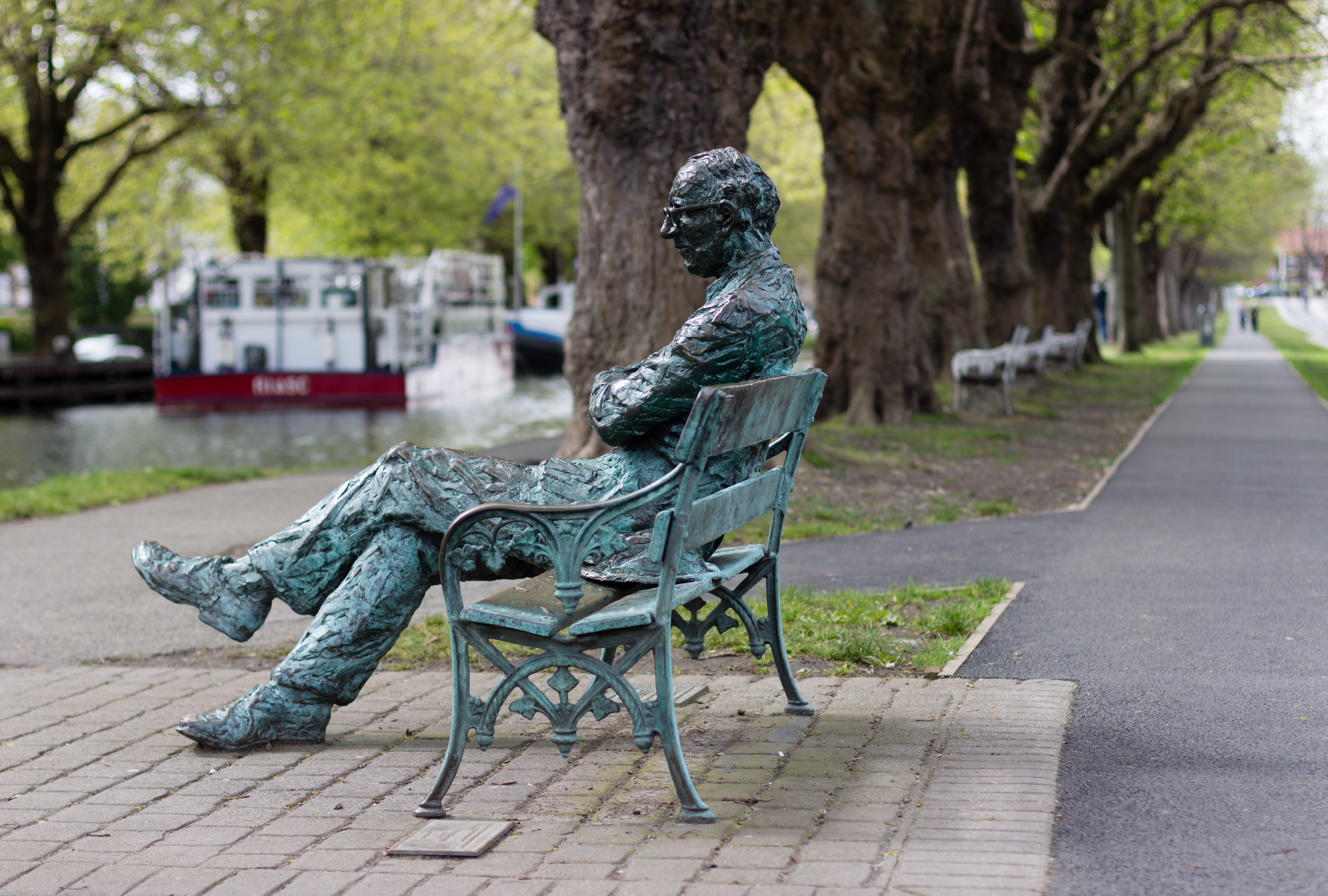
Patrick Kavanagh sculpture on the Grand Canal near Baggot Street

Until 1950 the Grand Canal Company had ownership of the canal, when the Transport Act 1950 transferred the canal to Córas Iompair Éireann. This situation continued until the Canals Act 1986 gave it to the Office of Public Works. Under the terms of the Good Friday Agreement of 1998, a new all-Ireland body called Waterways Ireland was established in 1999 and assumed responsibility for most inland navigable waterways including the Grand Canal.

== Grand Canal Way ==
The Grand Canal Way (Irish: Bealach na Canálach Móire) is a 117-kilometre (73 mi) long-distance trail that follows the towpath of the canal from Lucan Bridge, near Adamstown, to Shannon Harbour. It is typically completed in five days. It is designated as a National Waymarked Trail by the National Trails Office of the Irish Sports Council and is managed by Waterways Ireland. At Robertstown, the Grand Canal Way intersects with the Barrow Way, which follows the Barrow Line extension to the canal to Athy for part of its route. There is also an 8.5-kilometre (5.3 mi) long greenway between the 3rd Lock at Inchicore and the 12th Lock at Lucan, which opened in June 2010.

== Gallery ==
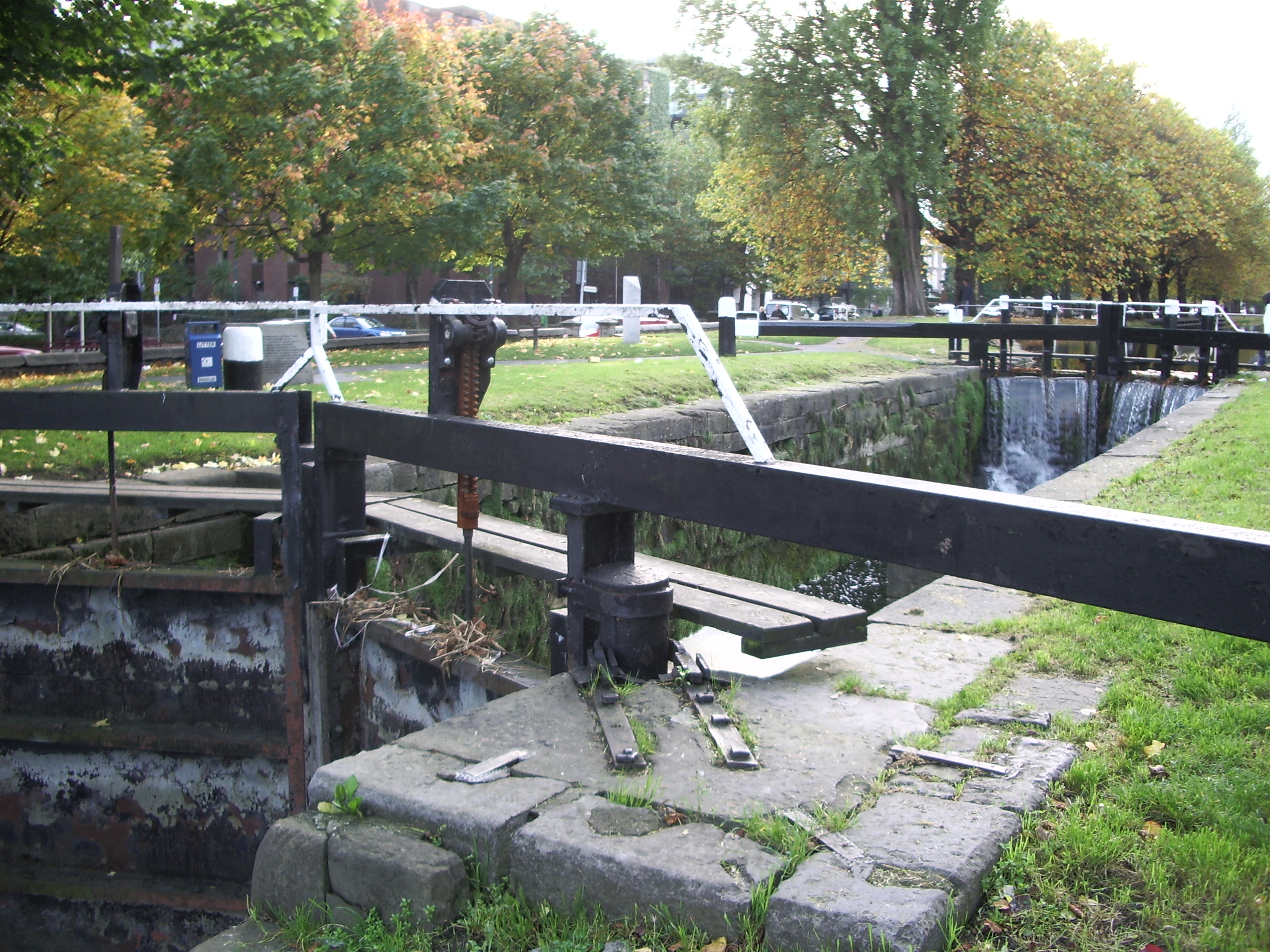
A lock on the Grand Canal in Dublin

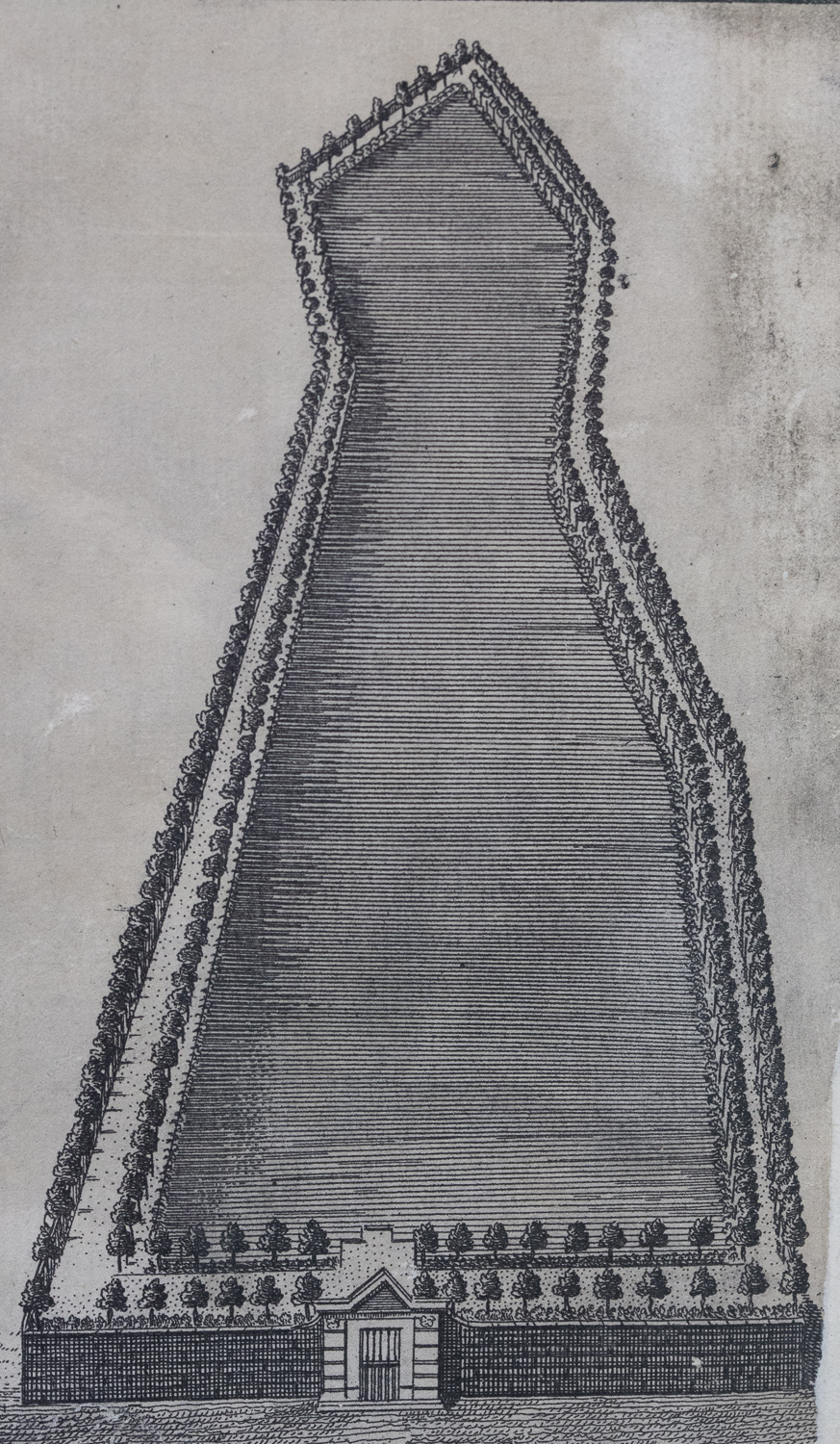
Dublin's city bason (city basin), fed by water from the Grand Canal by a series of gates and sluices

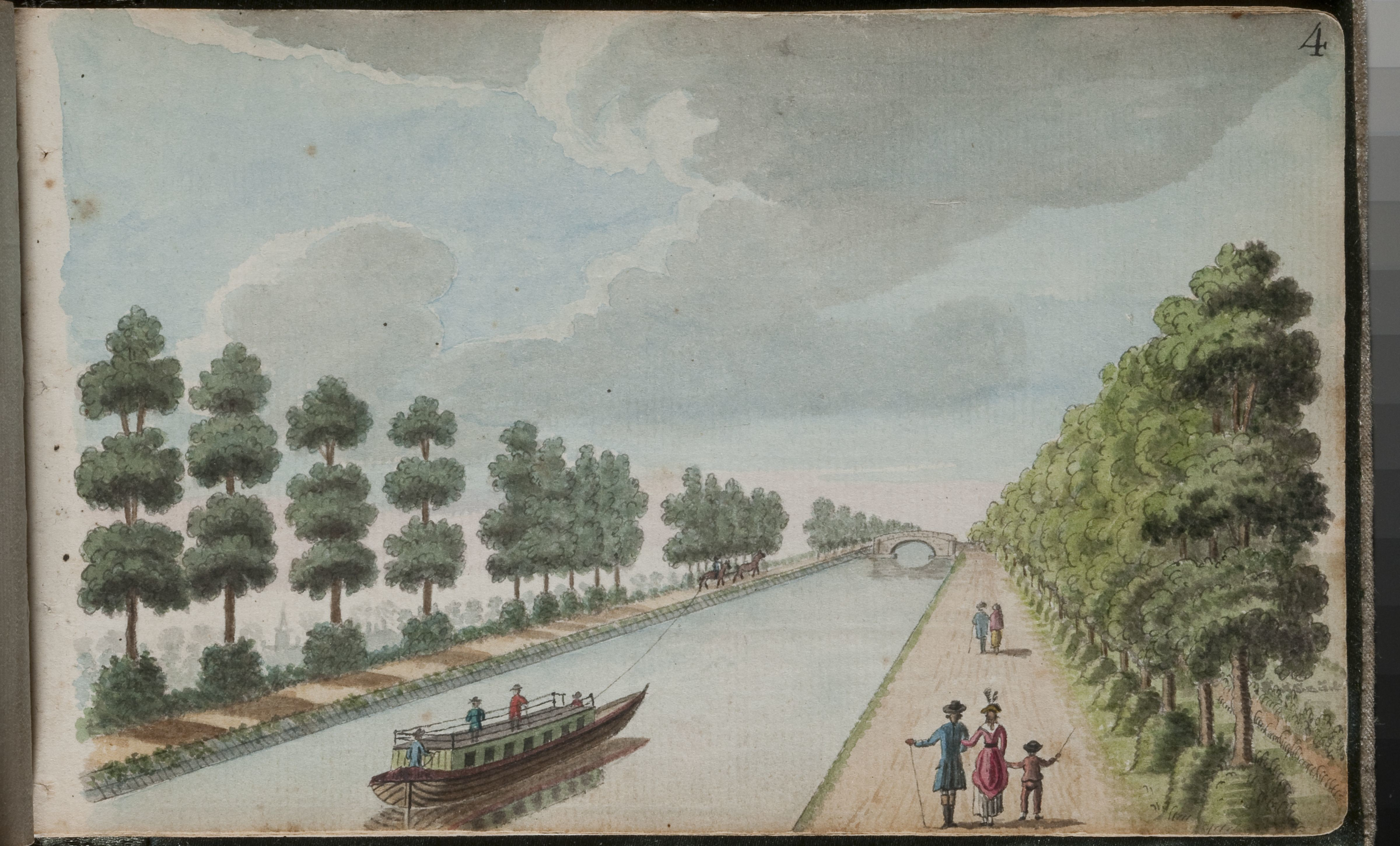
View of the Grand Canal, depicted between the first bridge and the first lock looking towards Dublin, ca. 1780-1800

== See also ==
- List of bridges over the Grand Canal in Greater Dublin
- Canals of Ireland
- Rivers of Ireland
- Transport in Ireland
- Grand Canal Dock
