= Kitty Flynn =

Irish historian (1926–2025)

Kathleen Flynn (4 April 1926 – 11 January 2025) was an Irish historian and author from Kilbeggan, County Westmeath. Her books largely relate to the local area, particularly during times of conflict such as the 1798 Rebellion.

== Life and career ==
Kathleen Flynn was born on 4 April 1926 in Kilbeggan to Edward Flynn, a farmer, and Agnes Brennan of Castletown Geoghan. Edward spent time in the American Navy before returning to his native Kilbeggan. Flynn's sister Teresa Moran was killed in Kilbeggan in a road accident on Main Street in 2003.

In 2016, Flynn was awarded a lifetime achievement award, following her graduation from NUI Galway, where she earned a BA in Community and Family Studies at the age of 90.

Flynn resided at her childhood home until her death on 11 January 2025, at the age of 98.
