= Marchioness Wellesley (1826 ship) =

UK paddle steamer 1826-1838

History

United Kingdom
- Name: Marchioness Wellesley
- Builder: Dublin
- Launched: 1826
- Fate: Last listed 1838

General characteristics
- Tons burthen: 117, or 118 (bm)

Marchioness Wellesley (Marchioness of Wellesley) was a packet paddle steamer launched in 1826 for the Dublin and Wexford Steam Co. She may have been the first steamship built in Ireland. She operated out of Dublin and was last listed in 1838.

== Origins ==
By one account, she was the first steamship built in Ireland, and her engines were the first marine engines built there too. The Ringsend Foundry (Ringsend Iron Works) were the builders of the steam engines and those were the first built in Ireland. This same source named City of Cork as the first steam ship built in Ireland, but the source's date for the build year for Marchioness of Wellesley is three years too late.

Another account states that Marchioness Wellesley was constructed by the Horseley Ironworks, Staffordshire, under the supervision of her owner, John Grantham. She was built on the River Mersey and then sailed across to Dublin. She had two iron hulls with a paddle wheel between them.

== Career ==
Marchioness Wellesley was the second steam ship to receive permission from the Grand Canal Company to steam from Dublin to Limerick. She arrived at Limerick on 2 February 1827.

Marchioness Wellesley first appeared in Lloyd's Register (LR) in 1828 with P.Barry, master, and the Dublin and Wexford Steam Co. as owner.

On 24 December 1827 she ran aground at Wexford. All on board were rescued. She had been refloated by 11 January 1828 and taken in to Wexford Harbour.

Neither the Shannon Steam Navigation Company nor the Dublin and Wexford Steam Company were successful and in 1829 the Irish Inland Steam Navigation Co. acquired them.

On 15 January 1833 Marchioness Wellesley towed into Waterford Calcutta, of Liverpool, Watson, master. Calcutta had left Liverpool for India but had lost her masts, boats, rudder, and anchor.

Marchioness Wellesley was last listed in 1838, with stale data.
