= Calcutta (1817 ship) =

History

United Kingdom
- Name: Calcutta
- Namesake: Calcutta
- Launched: 1817, Chester
- Fate: Last listed 1857

General characteristics
- Tons burthen: 389 (bm)

Calcutta was launched at Chester in 1817. She was a general trader and in her early years traded with India, sailing under a license from the British East India Company (EIC). She suffered a maritime mishap in 1833, but then traded for another 20+ years; she was last listed in 1857 with stale data.

== Career ==
In 1813 the EIC had lost its monopoly on the trade between India and Britain. British ships were then free to sail to India or the Indian Ocean under a license from the EIC.

Calcutta first appeared in Lloyd's Register (LR) in 1818 with Stroyan, master, Gladstone, owner, and trade Liverpool–Calcutta.

On 14 October 1818, Calcutta, Stroyan, master, set sail from Liverpool for Bengal. That same evening Susan, bound for Trieste, ran into Calcutta, damaging her. Both vessels had to put back to Liverpool to effect repairs.

Year	Master	Owner	Trade	Source & notes
1820	Stroyan	Gladstone	Liverpool–Calcutta	LR
1825	J.Stroyan	Gladstone	Liverpool–Alexandria	LR
1830	T.Watson	Gladstone	Liverpool–Calcutta	LR; large repair 1828

On 15 January 1833 the steam ship Marchioness Wellesley towed into Waterford Calcutta, of Liverpool, Watson, master. Calcutta had left Liverpool for India but had lost her masts, boats, rudder, and anchor. Lloyd's List reported on 18 January 1833 that the chief mate and the carpenter had brought the wreck into Waterford.

Year	Master	Owner	Trade	Source & notes
1935	Banks	Williamson	Liverpool–Quebec	LR
1840	Canney; Napier	J.Rogers	London–Africa; London–Quebec	LR;damages repaired and thorough repair 1837
1845	Retallick	J.Rogers	London–Quebec	LR;large repair 1837 & small repair 1842
1850	J.Rodd	Rogers		LR
1853	Simmons	J.Rogers	London–Boston	LR;large repair 1837 & 1848, and keelson and small repair 1853
1855	H.Wylie	J.Rodgers	Plymouth–Sierra Leone	LR;large repair 1837 & 1848, and keelson and small repair 1853
1857	H.Wylie			LR
