= River Brosna =

Tributary of the Shannon in central and western Ireland

Coordinates: 53°13′N 7°58′W

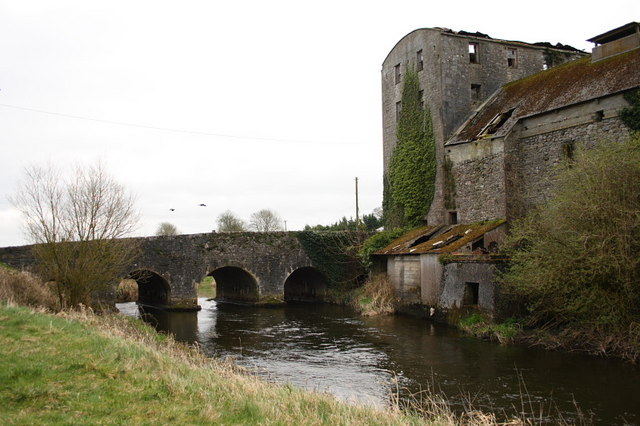
- Old mill on the Brosna at Kilbeggan
- Etymology: Possibly means "place of twigs"
- Native name: An Bhrosnach (Irish)

Location
- Country: Ireland

Physical characteristics
- Source
  - location: Near Mullingar, County Westmeath
- Mouth: River Shannon
  - location: Shannon Harbour
- Length: 79.26 km (49.25 mi)
- Basin size: 1,248 km^{2} (482 sq mi)
- Discharge
  - average: 5.13 m^{3}/s (181 cu ft/s)

Basin features
- River system: Shannon

The River Brosna (Irish: An Bhrosnach) is a river within the Shannon River Basin in Ireland, flowing through County Westmeath and County Offaly.

The river rises in Lough Owel north of Mullingar and is a tributary of the River Shannon. It meets the Shannon at Shannon Harbour.

The River Brosna is 49.25 miles (79 km) in length.

== Course ==
The Brosna begins as a small river, flowing from Lough Owel in a south-south-westerly direction through Mullingar, into Lough Ennell. From Lough Ennell, the river Brosna flows into Kilbeggan, where it still powers the mill at Kilbeggan Distillery. The Brosna continues flowing southwest through Clara, Ballycumber and Pullough. East of Ferbane it is joined by the Silver River. From Ferbane it heads to Shannon Harbour, north of Banagher, where it joins the Shannon

== Fishing ==
The river Brosna is popular for fly fishing and has stocks of brown trout as well as some salmon and grilse. However it has, in recent years, suffered somewhat from pollution problems due to its poor assimilative capacity and the discharge of untreated sewage in the Mullingar area during storm conditions. There have also been discharges of pollutants, whether accidental or otherwise, such as one filmed at the bridge of Clonmore industrial estate in Mullingar.

== Drainage ==
Works, to the cost of IR £750,000, were undertaken on the river in the late 1940s and early 1950s to improve drainage in the river’s catchment area. As part of the Arterial Drainage Scheme, designed to tackle poor drainage caused by Ireland’s relatively low-lying topography, the river was deepened and widened, leaving the river with the high banks distinctive of many of the rivers in the Irish midlands that received this treatment. More recently, in late 2008 the river was diverted from the N52 road beside Mullingar in order to accommodate a new roundabout and bridge.
