= Toxic capacity =

Toxic capacity can mean the toxicity of a substance, possibly in relation to a specific organism and toxic capacity can mean the capacity of an organism, organic system or ecosystem to contain a toxic substance or a selection of toxic substances (a compound) without showing signs of poisoning or dying.

== Toxic capacity among humans, children ==
Generally people with less mass have a lower toxic capacity than people with larger mass. In particular, children (who have lower mass compared to an adult) are more vulnerable to toxic effects of compounds. The compounds do not have to be poisons but could be medications as well, which is why children's dosages are almost always less than those of an adult, and the overdose danger higher for children.

== See also ==
- Persistent organic pollutants
- Toxicology
