= Shannon Harbour =

Coordinates: 53°13′N 7°57′W

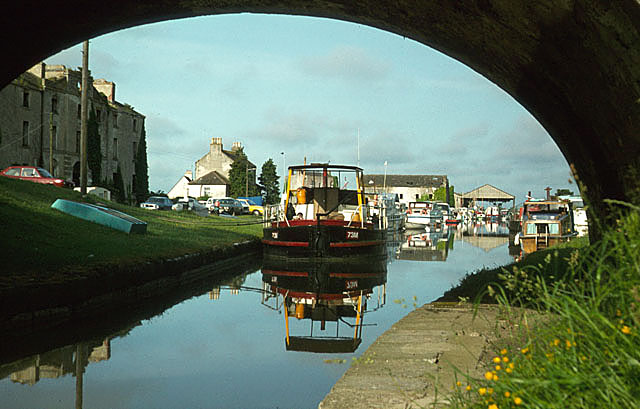
Shannon Harbour looking into the basin from the bridge above the lock

Shannon Harbour (Irish: Caladh na Sionainne) is a small village situated on the banks of the Grand Canal in County Offaly, Ireland. The older or regional name of the village is Cluain Uaine Bheag, meaning "Clononey Beg" or "little Clononey," named in contrast to Cluain Uaine Mhor or Clononey Mor ("Big Clononey") on the other side of a stream off the River Brosna. The name reflects the distance, population, and low-lying land of the area compared to its counterpart.

The village has docking facilities and two pubs, McIntyre's and the Canal Bar. Each year since 1971, the Shannon Harbour boat rally is organized by the Shannon Harbour branch of the Inland Waterways Association of Ireland. The Shannon Harbour area is located between Griffith Bridge, a sharp hump-back twist over the Grand Canal, and the Railway Bridge, a loop-around bridge over a hidden, derelict railway.

Shannon Harbour is notable for being where the Shannon, Brosna, and Grand Canal meet, making it a popular fishing destination for salmon, perch, and pike.

The first trade barge traveled from Dublin to Shannon Harbour in 1804, and by 1820, passenger boats made the 70-mile trip from Dublin to Shannon Harbour in 18 hours. The River Shannon is navigable from Shannon Harbour to Limerick and Athlone.

== In popular culture ==
There is an Irish tune by the name Uaine Bheagby the Irish group Slide.

== See also ==
- List of towns and villages in Ireland
