= List of civil parishes in Fingal =

This is a list of the civil parishes in the modern county of Fingal in Ireland. There are four baronies that are entirely contained in the county and one that is partly in the county and partly in the city of Dublin. Baronies and civil parishes continue to be officially defined units; they are no longer, however, used for many administrative purposes. Today, administrative authority for the county is vested in Fingal County Council. While they have been administratively obsolete since 1898, they continue to be used in land registration, and specification such as in planning permissions.

Barony (Contained in county)	Civil parishes of the Barony
Balrothery East; Entirely contained
Balrothery East; Entirely contained	Baldongan
Balrothery East; Entirely contained	Balrothery
Balrothery East; Entirely contained	Balscaddan
Balrothery East; Entirely contained	Holmpatrick
Balrothery East; Entirely contained	Lusk
Balrothery West; Entirely contained
Balrothery West; Entirely contained	Ballyboghil
Balrothery West; Entirely contained	Ballymadun
Balrothery West; Entirely contained	Clonmethan
Balrothery West; Entirely contained	Garristown
Balrothery West; Entirely contained	Grallagh
Balrothery West; Entirely contained	Hollywood
Balrothery West; Entirely contained	Naul
Balrothery West; Entirely contained	Palmerstown
Balrothery West; Entirely contained	Westpalstown
Castleknock; Entirely contained
Castleknock; Entirely contained	Castleknock
Castleknock; Entirely contained	Chapelizod
Castleknock; Entirely contained	Cloghran
Castleknock; Entirely contained	Clonsilla
Castleknock; Entirely contained	Finglas
Castleknock; Entirely contained	Mulhuddart
Castleknock; Entirely contained	St. James'
Castleknock; Entirely contained	Ward
Coolock; Partly contained
Coolock; Partly contained	Baldoyle
Coolock; Partly contained	Balgriffin
Coolock; Partly contained	Cloghran, Coolock
Coolock; Partly contained	Kinsaley
Coolock; Partly contained	Malahide
Coolock; Partly contained	Portmarnock
Coolock; Partly contained	Swords (Partly)
Nethercross; Entirely contained
Nethercross; Entirely contained	Donabate
Nethercross; Entirely contained	Finglas
Nethercross; Entirely contained	Killeek
Nethercross; Entirely contained	Killossery
Nethercross; Entirely contained	Kilsallaghan
Nethercross; Entirely contained	Portraine
Nethercross; Entirely contained	Swords (Partly)
