= List of subdivisions of County Dublin =

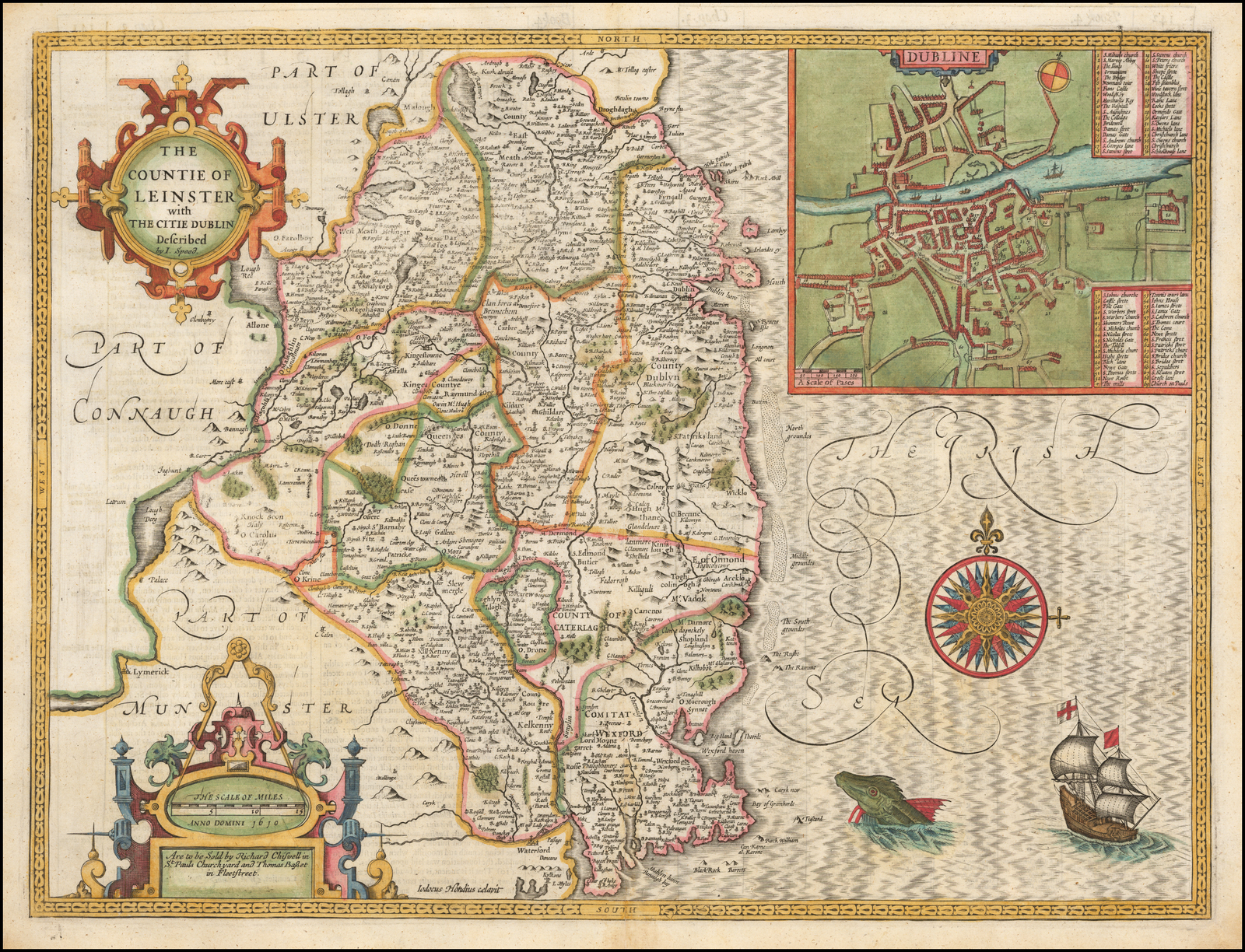
An early 17th-century map of Leinster showing Dublin prior to the creation of County Wicklow

County Dublin refers to a subdivision of Ireland occasioned by the Norman invasion of Ireland. This shire or county underwent further subdivisions as the territory was subinfeudated by the great barons among their vassals; these smaller areas were known as baronies. Under the government of the Kingdom of Ireland, baronies were in turn split into civil parishes. These also were split into the lowest recognised legal unit of land, the townland.

== Local government areas ==
The municipal borough of Dublin has historically been administered separately from the county. It was renamed a county borough under the Local Government (Ireland) Act 1898. In 1994, County Dublin was abolished as a local government area and replaced by Dún Laoghaire–Rathdown, Fingal and South Dublin. In 2001, the county borough of Dublin was renamed Dublin City, with the Dublin Corporation replaced by Dublin City Council.

== Usage of "County Dublin" ==
While County Dublin is not recognised as a local government area, the term "County Dublin" remains in common usage, including by state organs. County Dublin is a recognised placename in the Placenames Database of Ireland. Residents in all four local government areas share a collective Dublin identity. Dublin is still organised as a county by the Gaelic Athletic Association in the case of Dublin GAA.

The Central Statistics Office published a county report from the 2022 census for County Dublin as a whole. County Dublin is a NUTS III statistical region in Ireland, as recognised by the European Union. Dublin is a strategic planning area within the Eastern and Midland Region.

Although the Electoral Commission should, as far as practicable, avoid breaching county boundaries when recommending Dáil constituencies, this does not include the boundaries of a city or the boundary between the three counties in Dublin.

During the COVID-19 pandemic in the Republic of Ireland, both the Department of Health and the Department of the Taoiseach referred to "County Dublin" when reporting county-by-county incidences and when announcing local lockdowns, rather than using the term "Dublin Region" or its four local government areas. Further, the Dublin Chamber of Commerce refers to Dublin as both a county and a region interchangeably.

== Division by barony and civil parish ==
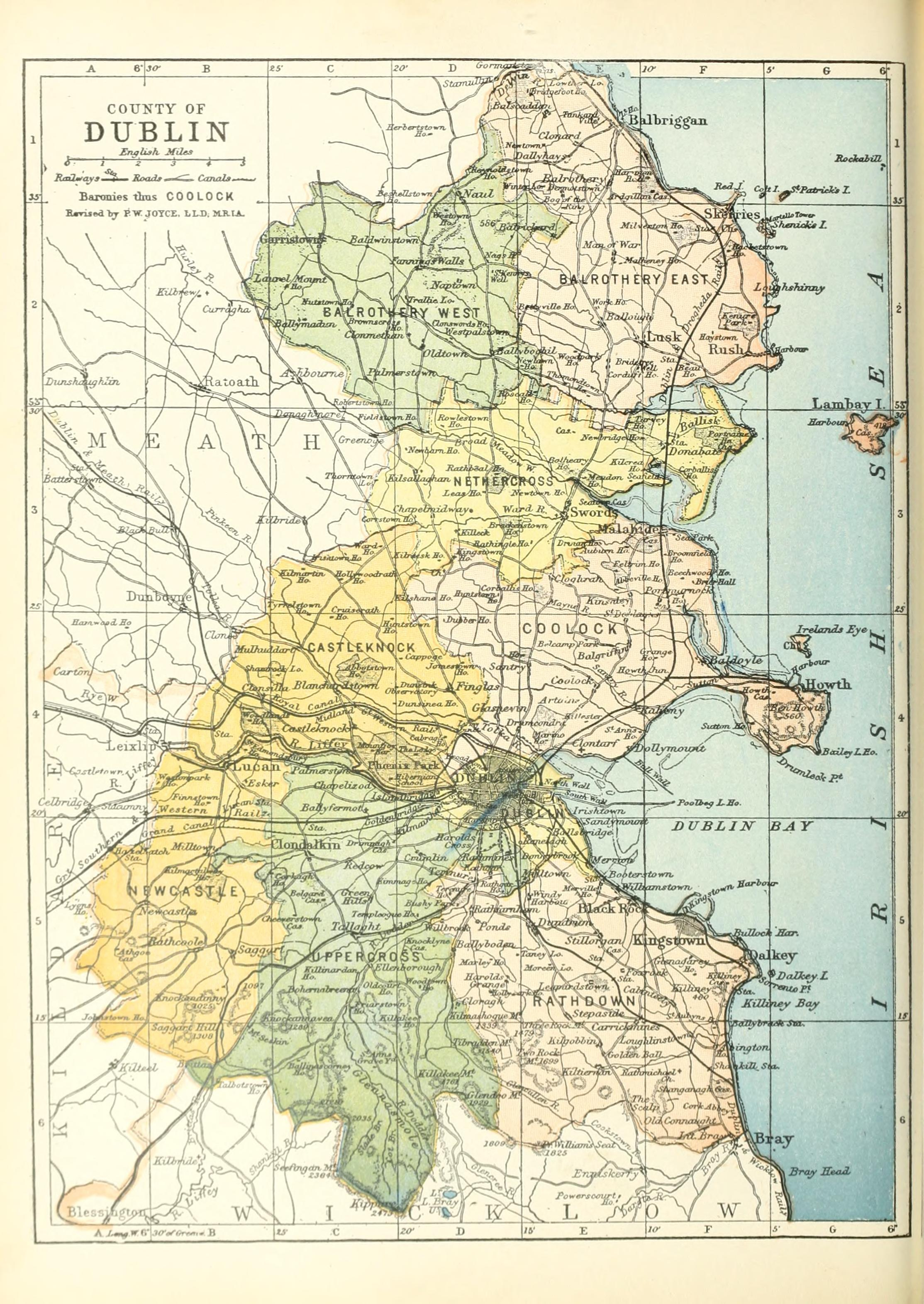
Map of baronies, 1900.

Most of the links are to articles on modern districts, which are usually not fully aligned to the civil parishes.

Barony	Civil Parish
Balrothery East	Baldongan; Balrothery; Balscadden; Holmpatrick; Lusk
Balrothery West	Ballyboghil; Ballymadun; Hollywood; Naul; Westpalstown; Clonmethan; Garristown; Grallagh
Castleknock	Castleknock; Chapelizod; Cloghran; Clonsilla; Finglas; Mulhuddart; St. James'; Ward
Coolock	Artaine; Baldoyle; Balgriffin; Cloghran; Clontarf; Clonturk (Drumcondra); Coolock; Glasnevin; Grangegorman; Howth; Kilbarrack; Killester; Kinsaley; Malahide; Portmarnock; Raheny; Santry; St. George's; St. Margaret's; Swords
Barony of Dublin City	St. Nicholas Within; St. Audoens; St. Michael's
Barony of Dublin	Booterstown; Donnybrook; Monkstown; St. Mark's; Taney (Dundrum); Grangegorman; Glasnevin; Manor of St. Sepulchre; St. Andrew's; St. Ann's; St. Bride's; St. Catherines; St. George; St. James; St. John's; St. Luke's; St. Mark's; St. Mary's; St. Michans; St. Nicholas Without; St. Patrick's; St. Paul's; St. Peters; St. Thomas; St. Werburgh
Nethercross	Donabate; Finglas; Killeek; Killossery; Kilsallaghan; Portraine; Swords
Newcastle	Aderrig; Clondalkin; Esker; Kilbride; Kilmactalway; Kilmahuddrick; Leixlip; Lucan; Newcastle; Rathcoole; Saggart
Rathdown	Booterstown; Dalkey; Donnybrook; Kilgobbin; Kill; Killiney; Kilmacud; Kiltiernan; Monkstown; Oldconnaught; Rathfarnham; Rathmichael; Stillorgan; Taney; Tully; Whitechurch
Uppercross	Ballyfermot; Clondalkin; Cruagh; Crumlin; Donnybrook; Drimnagh; Esker; Palmerstown; Rathfarnham; St. Catherine's; St. James'; St. Nicholas Without The Walls; St. Peter's, County Dublin; Tallaght

== Electoral divisions ==
Until the Local Government (Ireland) Act 1919, the city of Dublin was divided into wards and County Dublin into district electoral divisions (DEDs) to elect local councillors. After the introduction of multi-member districts elected by the single transferable vote, these units were combined to create local electoral areas. In 1996, wards and DEDs were both renamed electoral divisions, which are used to define electoral boundaries.

=== City of Dublin ===
==== North ====
- Arran Quay A,
- Arran Quay B,
- Arran Quay C,
- Arran Quay D,
- Arran Quay E,
- Ashtown A,
- Ashtown B,
- Ayrfield,
- Ballybough A,
- Ballybough B,
- Ballygall A,
- Ballygall B,
- Ballygall C,
- Ballygall D,
- Ballymun A,
- Ballymun B,
- Ballymun C,
- Ballymun D,
- Ballymun E,
- Ballymun F,
- Beaumont A,
- Beaumont B,
- Beaumont C,
- Beaumont D,
- Beaumont E,
- Beaumont F,
- Botanic A,
- Botanic B,
- Botanic C,
- Cabra East A,
- Cabra East B,
- Cabra East C,
- Cabra West A,
- Cabra West B,
- Cabra West C,
- Cabra West D,
- Clontarf East A,
- Clontarf East B,
- Clontarf East C,
- Clontarf East D,
- Clontarf East E,
- Clontarf West A,
- Clontarf West B,
- Clontarf West C,
- Clontarf West D,
- Clontarf West E,
- Drumcondra South A,
- Drumcondra South B,
- Drumcondra South C,
- Edenmore,
- Finglas North A,
- Finglas North B,
- Finglas North C,
- Finglas South A,
- Finglas South B,
- Finglas South C,
- Finglas South D,
- Grace Park,
- Grange A,
- Grange B,
- Grange C,
- Grange D,
- Grange E,
- Harmonstown A,
- Harmonstown B,
- Inns Quay A,
- Inns Quay B,
- Inns Quay C,
- Kilmore A,
- Kilmore B,
- Kilmore C,
- Kilmore D,
- Mountjoy A,
- Mountjoy B,
- North City,
- North Dock A,
- North Dock B,
- North Dock C,
- Phoenix Park,
- Priorswood A,
- Priorswood B,
- Priorswood C,
- Priorswood D,
- Priorswood E,
- Raheny-Foxfield,
- Raheny-Greendale,
- Raheny-St. Assam,
- Rotunda A,
- Rotunda B,
- Whitehall A,
- Whitehall B,
- Whitehall C,
- Whitehall D,

==== South ====
- Chapelizod,
- Cherry Orchard A,
- Carna,
- Cherry Orchard C,
- Crumlin A,
- Crumlin B,
- Crumlin C,
- Crumlin D,
- Crumlin E,
- Crumlin F,
- Decies,
- Drumfinn,
- Inchicore A,
- Inchicore B,
- Kilmainham A,
- Kilmainham B,
- Kilmainham C,
- Kimmage A,
- Kimmage B,
- Kimmage C,
- Kimmage D,
- Kimmage E,
- Kylemore,
- Mansion House A,
- Mansion House B,
- Merchants Quay A,
- Merchants Quay B,
- Merchants Quay C,
- Merchants Quay D,
- Merchants Quay E,
- Merchants Quay F,
- Pembroke East A,
- Pembroke East B,
- Pembroke East C,
- Pembroke East D,
- Pembroke East E,
- Pembroke West A,
- Pembroke West B,
- Pembroke West C,
- Rathfarnham,
- Rathmines East A,
- Rathmines East B,
- Rathmines East C,
- Rathmines East D,
- Rathmines West A,
- Rathmines West B,
- Rathmines West C,
- Rathmines West D,
- Rathmines West E,
- Rathmines West F,
- Royal Exchange A,
- Royal Exchange B,
- St. Kevin's,
- South Dock,
- Terenure A,
- Terenure B,
- Terenure C,
- Terenure D,
- Ushers A,
- Ushers B,
- Ushers C,
- Ushers D,
- Ushers E,
- Ushers F,
- Walkinstown A,
- Walkinstown B,
- Walkinstown C,
- Wood Quay A,
- Wood Quay B

=== Dún Laoghaire–Rathdown ===
- Ballinteer-Broadford,
- Ballinteer-Ludford,
- Ballinteer-Marley,
- Ballinteer-Meadowbroads,
- Ballinteer-Meadowmount,
- Ballinteer-Woodpark,
- Ballybrack,
- Blackrock-Booterstown,
- Blackrock-Carysfort,
- Blackrock-Central,
- Blackrock-Glenomena,
- Blackrock-Monkstown,
- Blackrock-Newpark,
- Blackrock-Seapoint,
- Blackrock-Stradbrook,
- Blackrock-Templehill,
- Blackrock-Williamstown,
- Cabinteely-Granitefield,
- Cabinteely-Kilbogget,
- Cabinteely-Loughlinstown,
- Cabinteely-Pottery,
- Churchtown-Castle,
- Churchtown-Landscape,
- Churchtown-Nutgrove,
- Churchtown-Orwell,
- Churchtown-Woodlawn,
- Clonskeagh-Belfield,
- Clonskeagh-Farranboley,
- Clonskeagh-Milltown,
- Clonskeagh-Roebuck,
- Clonskeagh-Windy Arbour,
- Dalkey-Avondale,
- Dalkey-Bullock,
- Dalkey-Coliemore,
- Dalkey Hill,
- Dalkey Upper,
- Dundrum-Balally,
- Dundrum-Kilmacud,
- Dundrum-Sandyford,
- Dundrum-Sweetmount,
- Dundrum-Taney,
- Dún Laoghaire-East Central,
- Dún Laoghaire-Glasthule,
- Dún Laoghaire-Glenageary,
- Dún Laoghaire-Monkstown Farm,
- Dún Laoghaire-Mount Town,
- Dún Laoghaire-Sallynoggin East,
- Dún Laoghaire-Sallynoggin South,
- Dún Laoghaire-Sallynoggin West,
- Dún Laoghaire-Sandycove,
- Dún Laoghaire-Salthill,
- Dún Laoghaire-West Central,
- Foxrock-Beechpark,
- Foxrock-Carrickmines,
- Foxrock-Deans Grange,
- Foxrock-Torquay,
- Glencullen,
- Johnstown,
- Killiney North,
- Killiney South,
- Shankill-Rathmichael,
- Shankill-Rathsallagh,
- Shankill-Shanganagh,
- Stillorgan-Deerpark,
- Stillorgan-Kilmacud,
- Stillorgan-Leopardstown,
- Stillorgan-Merville,
- Stillorgan-Mount Merrion,
- Stillorgan-Priory,
- Tibradden

=== Fingal ===
- Airport,
- Balbriggan Rural,
- Balbriggan Urban,
- Baldoyle,
- Balgriffin,
- Ballyboghil,
- Balscadden,
- Blanchardstown-Abbotstown,
- Blanchardstown-Blakestown,
- Blanchardstown-Coolmine,
- Blanchardstown-Corduff,
- Blanchardstown-Delwood,
- Blanchardstown-Mulhuddart,
- Blanchardstown-Roselawn,
- Blanchardstown-Tyrrelstown,
- Castleknock-Knockmaroon,
- Castleknock-Park,
- Clonmethan,
- Donabate,
- Dubber,
- Garristown,
- Hollywood,
- Holmpatrick,
- Howth,
- Kilsallaghan,
- Kinsaley,
- Lucan North,
- Lusk,
- Malahide East,
- Malahide West,
- Portmarnock North,
- Portmarnock South,
- Rush,
- Skerries,
- Sutton,
- Swords-Forrest,
- Swords-Glasmore,
- Swords-Lissenhall,
- Swords-Seatown,
- Swords Village,
- The Ward,
- Turnapin

=== South Dublin ===
- Ballinascorney,
- Ballyboden,
- Bohernabreena,
- Clondalkin-Ballymount,
- Clondalkin-Cappaghmore,
- Clondalkin-Dunawley,
- Clondalkin-Monastery,
- Clondalkin-Moorfield,
- Clondalkin-Rowlagh,
- Clondalkin Village,
- Edmondstown,
- Firhouse-Ballycullen,
- Firhouse-Knocklyon,
- Firhouse Village,
- Lucan-Esker,
- Lucan Heights,
- Lucan-St. Helen's,
- Newcastle,
- Palmerston Village,
- Palmerston West,
- Rathcoole,
- Rathfarnham-Ballyroan,
- Rathfarnham-Butterfield,
- Rathfarnham-Hermitage,
- Rathfarnham-St. Enda's,
- Rathfarnham Village,
- Saggart,
- Tallaght-Avonbeg,
- Tallaght-Belgard,
- Tallaght-Fettercairn,
- Tallaght-Glenview,
- Tallaght-Jobstown,
- Tallaght-Killinardan,
- Tallaght-Kilnamanagh,
- Tallaght-Kiltipper,
- Tallaght-Kingswood,
- Tallaght-Millbrook,
- Tallaght-Oldbawn,
- Tallaght-Springfield,
- Tallaght-Tymon,
- Templeogue-Cypress,
- Templeogue-Kimmage Manor,
- Templeogue-Limekiln,
- Templeogue-Orwell,
- Templeogue-Osprey,
- Templeogue Village,
- Terenure-Cherryfield,
- Terenure-Greentrees,
- Terenure-St. James
