= Cloghran =

Cloghran may refer to:

- Cloghran, Castleknock - a civil parish in the barony of Castleknock in Fingal, Ireland
- Cloghran, Coolock - a civil parish in the barony of Coolock in Dublin, Ireland
