= Finglas (civil parish) =

Civil parish in County Dublin, Ireland

Coordinates: 53.390175°N 6.299629°W

Finglas (Irish: Fionnghlas) is a civil parish mainly situated in the barony of Castleknock in the traditional county of Dublin, Ireland. It contains 34 townlands. Today, the parish is split between two local government areas: the modern county of Fingal (to the west) and Dublin City Council (to the east).

== Location ==
Like all civil parishes in Ireland, this civil parish is derived from, and co-extensive with, a pre-existing parish of the Church of Ireland. The Archdiocese of Dublin held a number of manors as cross lands. The manor of Finglas contained most of the area of the parish in four distinct parcels of 4,487 acres in total. The core of the parish is centered on the village of Finglas, which lies within the barony of Castleknock. However, a substantial exclave of the parish is situated within the neighbouring barony of Nethercross. Since Kilreesk has a cell toponym, this suggests that the church was a pre-Invasion chapel of ease. This parcel of land contains six townlands. Additionally, within the barony of Castleknock itself, two further parcels of land, that are distinct from the core around the village, are situated to the north of the barony. The larger parcel contains six townlands around the Kilshane chapel of ease. The smaller parcel consists of a single townland and is surrounded by the civil parishes of Mulhuddart and Cloghran.

== Townlands ==
Townlands in the civil parish of Finglas
Contiguous portion	Local authority	Townland name	Irish name	Comments
Core village in barony of Castleknock	Fingal	Balseskin	Baile Seiscinn	Central part contains the ramps and ancillary roads of the interchange where the M50 crosses the old North Road (N3) at junction 6.
Core village in barony of Castleknock	Fingal	Charlestown	Baile Shéarlais	Its southern edge forms the Fingal / City boundary
Core village in barony of Castleknock	Fingal	Coldwinters	Buaile an Gheimhridh	The most northerly point of this part of the parish.
Core village in barony of Castleknock	Fingal	Jamestown Little (partly)	Baile Shéamais Beag	Located on the western side of the Jamestown Road.The top half of the townland and of the Jamestown Industrial Estate is in Fingal.
Core village in barony of Castleknock	Fingal	Kildonan (partly)	Cill Dónáin	Most of the land lies on the M50 ramp and north of the motorway.Access is only possible from the cul-de-sac on the old N3 at Coldwinters.
Core village in barony of Castleknock	Fingal	Stockens	Stoicín	Its northern edge forms the Fingal / City boundary
Core village in barony of Castleknock	Dublin City	Ballyboggan North	Baile Bogáin Thuaidh	Its southern border is the river Tolka. It is bisected by the Tolka Valley Road.
Core village in barony of Castleknock	Dublin City	Ballyboggan South	Baile Bogáin Theas	Bounded by the Tolka to the north and the Royal Canal to the south.Bisected by the Broombridge Road (north to south).
Core village in barony of Castleknock	Dublin City	Ballygall	Baile Gall	The Hillcrest Park housing estate was built on the site of Ballygall House.
Core village in barony of Castleknock	Dublin City	Cabragh	An Chabrach	The most southerly point of this part of the parish.Adjoins two other townlands or the same name in two neighbouring parishes(Castleknock and Grangegorman). Contains Broombridge railway station.
Core village in barony of Castleknock	Dublin City	Cardiffsbridge	Droichead Chairdif	Located in the south-west corner of the parish. The river Tolka is the southern boundary.The Ratoath Road runs diagonally through it from top to bottom.
Core village in barony of Castleknock	Dublin City	Cardiffscastle	Caisleán Chairdif	Forms the boundary with Fingal to the west and north at Northern Cross Business Park.Bounded to the east by the R135 and to the south by the Cappagh Road.
Core village in barony of Castleknock	Dublin City	Finglas East	Fionnghlas Thoir	This townland at the heart of the village has the greatest area in the parish at 327 acres.
Core village in barony of Castleknock	Dublin City	Finglas West	Fionnghlas Thiar	Located to the west of the N2, this part of the village goes from Ratoath Drive in the westto Farnham Drive in the east and Cappagh Road to the north.
Core village in barony of Castleknock	Dublin City	Glasnevin Demesne	Diméin Ghlas Naíon	Entirely surrounded by Tolka and by a townland of the same name to the eastin the parish of Glasnevin.
Core village in barony of Castleknock	Dublin City	Glebe	An Ghléib	Northern edge forms the Fingal / City boundary
Core village in barony of Castleknock	Dublin City	Finglas Wood	Coill Fhionnghlaise	Finglaswood House was situated in what is now the Tolka Valley Park.
Core village in barony of Castleknock	Dublin City	Jamestown Great	Baile Shéamais Mór	Located on the eastern side of the Jamestown Road.
Core village in barony of Castleknock	Dublin City	Jamestown Little (partly)	Baile Shéamais Beag	Located on the western side of the Jamestown Road.The bottom half of the townland and of the Jamestown Industrial Estate is in the City.
Core village in barony of Castleknock	Dublin City	Johnstown	Baile Sheáin	The central part of the townland is now the site of Johnstown Park.
Core village in barony of Castleknock	Dublin City	Kildonan (partly)	Cill Dónáin	
Core village in barony of Castleknock	Dublin City	Poppintree	Crann Phapáin	Adjacent to the larger townland of the same name in the neighbouring parish of Santry.
Core village in barony of Castleknock	Dublin City	Springmount	Cnocán an Fhuaráin	Centred on Cardiffsbridge Road and Wellmount Road.Its southern boundary is the river Tolka.
Core village in barony of Castleknock	Dublin City	Stang	An Stang	At the junction of Glasnevin Avenue and Willow Park Road
Core village in barony of Castleknock	Dublin City	Tolka	An Tulcha	Straddles the Finglas Road from the River Tolka in the south to the village.
Large exclave in barony of Castleknock	Fingal	Bishopswood	Coill an Easpaig	Separated from Broghan by a tributary of the Ward river.
Large exclave in barony of Castleknock	Fingal	Broghan	An Bruachán	Straddles the old North Road (N2). Separated from Bishopswood by a tributary of the Ward river.
Large exclave in barony of Castleknock	Fingal	Kilshane	Cill Sheáin	The townland links Tyrrelstown in the west with St Margaret's in the east.Kilshane House still stands.The motte at the northern end has been obliterated.
Large exclave in barony of Castleknock	Fingal	Shallon	Sealúin	The most northerly point of this part of the parish.Its larger neighbour of the same name lies to the east in the parish of Killsallaghan.
Small exclave in barony of Castleknock	Fingal	Cruiserath	Ráth an Chrúisigh	A single townland surrounded on three sides by the parish of Mulhuddart and to the south-east by Cloghran.A "daisy chain" of four roundabouts separates it from Tyrrelstown to the west.The largest development is the "Rosemount Business Park".
Exclave in barony of Nethercross	Fingal	Ballystrahan	Baile an tSrutháin	Bisected from north to south by the R122.
Exclave in barony of Nethercross	Fingal	Kilreesk	Cill Réisc	The most southerly point of the exclave. Bounded to the east by the R122.Separated from the Castleknock exclave by the townland of Kilmacree in the parish of Killsallaghan.
Exclave in barony of Nethercross	Fingal	Laurestown	Baile Labhráis	Bounded to the west by the R122 and to the south by the Ward river.
Exclave in barony of Nethercross	Fingal	Skephubble	Sceich an Phubaill	Bounded to the west by the R122 and to the north by the Ward river.
Exclave in barony of Nethercross	Fingal	Toberburr	Tobar Boir	Bisected from west to east by the Ward river.The townland of Westereave is an enclave of this townland.A second enclave is an enclave of the parish of Killeek.
Exclave in barony of Nethercross	Fingal	Westereave	Westereave	This strip of land is less than an acre in area.It is separated from its eponymous neighbour of 170 acres which lies in the parish of Killeek.It is entirely surrounded by the townland of Toberburr.
