= Balrothery East =

Barony of Ireland

Balrothery East (Irish: Baile an Ridire Thoir) is one of the baronies of Ireland. Originally part of the Lordship of Meath, it was then constituted as part of County Dublin. Today, it is in the modern county of Fingal.

The barony of Balrothery was created by Hugh de Lacy, Lord of Meath as his own feudal barony, held directly from himself in capite. His vassals were commonly called "De Lacy's Barons". Balrothery, thus once a feudal title of nobility, was later split into eastern and western divisions.

At the heart of the barony is the civil parish of Balrothery in the northwest of the barony, one of eight civil parishes in the barony.

== Location ==
It is bordered by the baronies of Balrothery West to the west and Nethercross to the south; by County Meath to the north and by the Irish Sea to the east.

== History ==
It was organised soon after the Norman invasion of Ireland by Hugh de Lacy, Lord of Meath. Balrothery East formerly included Lambay Island, which is now part of the barony of Nethercross.

== Civil parishes ==
The barony is divided into five civil parishes: Balrothery, (Note: Civil parish of Balrothery) Baldongan, (Note: Civil parish of Baldongan) Balscaddan, (Note: Civil parish of Baldscaddan) Holmpatrick, (Note: Civil parish of Holmpatrick) and Lusk, (Note: Civil parish of Lusk) The main population centres of the barony are Balbriggan, Skerries, Rush, and Lusk.

== See also ==
List of subdivisions of County Dublin
