= Man of War, County Dublin =

Area of north County Dublin, Ireland

Coordinates: 53°33′42″N 6°11′04″W

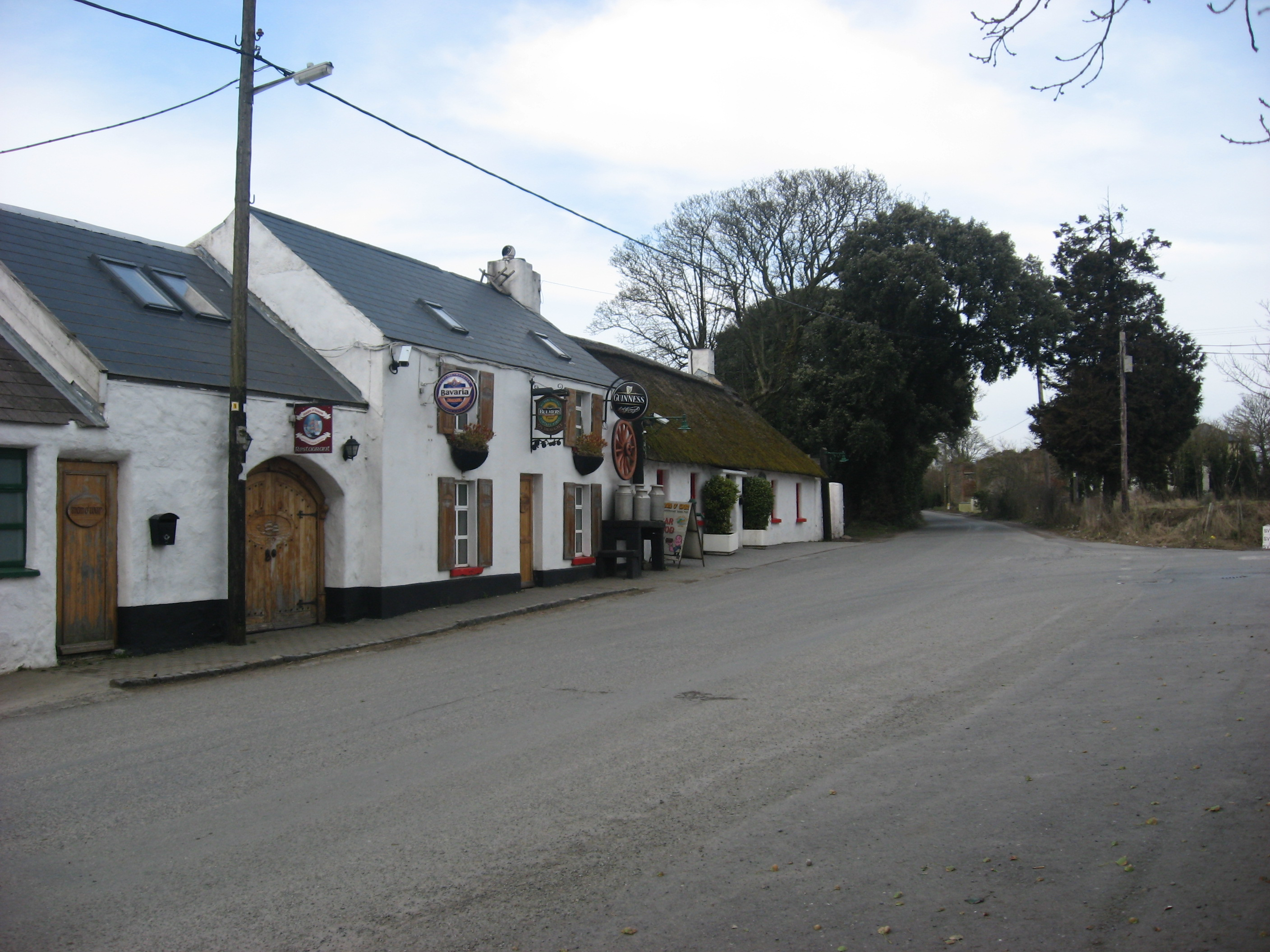
The Man O' War public house

Man of War (also known as Man O' War) is a small populated place in north County Dublin, Ireland. It is centred on the townlands of Courtlough, Malheney and Palmerstown which lie in the civil parish of Balrothery, and is in the Fingal local government area. Man of War is about 24 kilometres north of Dublin city centre, between the towns of Skerries, Lusk and Balbriggan.

The Man of War area is noted for its public house and restaurant which has a preserved tree inside the establishment and also shares the name Man of War. The building has existed for centuries, with deeds mentioning it at least as far back to 1595.

In 1732, an Act of Parliament established the tolled Coach Road called the Dublin to Dunleer Turnpike (1732—1855) and a turnpike (toll booth) was situated at the Man O'War Pub. The toll booth has since been removed.

The Gaelic football team of the same name, Man-O-War GFC, was founded in 1946. It fields teams from Juvenile, Adult Men and Adult Ladies levels. The club's achievements include winning the Men's Dublin Junior Football Championship in 1979 and 2023, and winning the Ladies Dublin Junior A Football Championship in 2019.
