= Abbeville, Dublin =

Georgian house, Kinsealy, near Dublin, Ireland

Abbeville
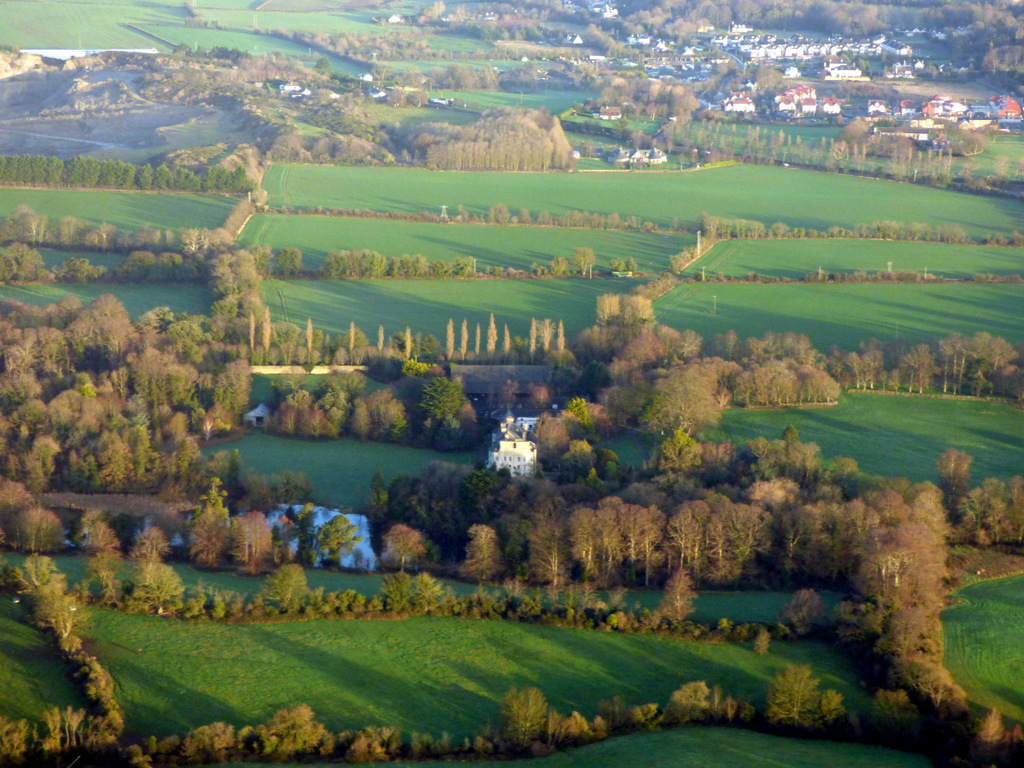
- Abbeville from the air
- Interactive map of the Abbeville area

General information
- Status: Private dwelling house
- Type: House
- Architectural style: Georgian
- Location: Kinsealy, Dublin, Ireland
- Coordinates: 53.4272°N 6.1846°W
- Estimated completion: 1790
- Renovated: 1945

Technical details
- Floor count: 3

Design and construction
- Architect: James Gandon
- Developer: John Beresford
- Known for: Former residence of Charles Haughey

Renovating team
- Architect: Michael Scott (1945)

Abbeville, formerly Abbeyville House, is an 18th-century Georgian house in the townland of Abbeyville, civil parish of Kinsealy, County Dublin, Ireland.

It is known for being designed by James Gandon as well as being the home of Charles Haughey during his years as Taoiseach. The grounds contain streams, a pond and the site of a long-closed brewery.

== History ==
Richard Montgomery (1738–1775) grew up on the original estate. His father Thomas Montgomery is recorded as leasing the estate as his Dublin residence in 1736. It was then under a different name.

The house was substantially altered and enlarged by James Gandon for John Beresford in about 1790. It consists of two storeys over a basement; the front has seven bays, flanked by two wide curved bows, and is extended by single-storey one-bay wings.

It is said the house was named as Beresford's son was marrying a woman from Abbeville in France. Beresford's first wife was also French and had died in 1772.

For a period in the early 19th century the house was owned by the antiquarian Austin Cooper. The house was owned by the Cusack family for over a century from 1830 until 1940. In 1945, the architect Michael Scott is recorded as carrying out work on the house for Percy Reynolds, who bought the house in the 1940s.

In 1969 the house was bought by Charles J Haughey, then a minister for finance, who became Taoiseach in 1979. Renovation works were carried out by Sam Stephenson. In 2003, after his retirement, Haughey sold it to Manor Park Homes, which intended to redevelop it after his death, which occurred in 2006. Manor Park Homes went bankrupt during the Irish financial crisis, and in 2012, the house was offered for sale at a guide price of €7.5 million, about a fifth of the 2003 price. Parts of the Abbeville estate were separated to provide sites for homes for members of the Haughey family, including his widow, and these remain in family hands.

Abbeville was purchased in 2013 by the Japanese Nishida family, owners of the Toyoko Inn hotel group.

== Access ==
For most of recent history, the house and grounds were almost wholly private. Under the previous property tax regime, it was possible for Abbeville to be exempt if the house was open one day a year, a requirement fulfilled by events on the annual Irish Cancer Society Daffodil Day; the much more extensive opening required to avoid inheritance tax was not done.

=== Emsworth House ===
The house contains a tunnel which connects with the James Gandon designed Emsworth House nearby which was constructed in 1794 for James Woodmason. Woodmason, a London stationer, had earlier joined Beresford as a partner in his Dublin banking operations at Beresford Place alongside Thomas Needham in 1793.

== Sources ==
- M. Bence-Jones, A guide to Irish country houses, Constable, 1990, p. 1
- B. De Breffny & R. ffolliot, The houses of Ireland, Thames & Hudson, 1984, p. 168
- J. O'Brien & D. Guinness, Great Irish houses and castles, Weidenfeld & Nicolson, 1992, pp. 106–107
