= Newcastle (County Dublin barony) =

Newcastle (Irish: An Caisleán Nua) (Note: Barony of Newcastle) is a feudal title of nobility and one of the baronies of Ireland. It was constituted as part of the old county of Dublin. Today, it lies in the modern county of South Dublin. At the heart of the barony is the civil parish of the same name - Newcastle - which is one of eleven civil parishes in the barony. The ruins of the eponymous castle, also known as Newcastle-Lyons, are located in the townland of Newcastle South. The town with the biggest population in the barony is Lucan.

== Location ==
It is one of seven and a half baronies that used to comprise the old county of Dublin. It stretches from the River Liffey to the Wicklow Mountains (from north to south) and from the border with County Kildare to Clondalkin and Palmerstown (from west to east). It is located between the baronies of Castleknock (north of the river), Uppercross (to the east) and South Salt, County Kildare (to the south and west). Apart from an exclave of the civil parish of Leixlip that lies beyond the river, the rest of the barony is contained within the modern county of South Dublin and it is subject to South Dublin County Council.

== Legal context and history ==
Baronies were created after the Norman invasion of Ireland as subdivisions of counties and were used for administration. While baronies continue to be officially defined units, they are no longer used for many administrative purposes. They have been administratively obsolete since 1898. Nevertheless, they continue to be used in land registration and specification such as in planning permissions. In many cases, a barony corresponds to an earlier Gaelic túath which had submitted to the Crown. This is true of Newcastle, which at the time of its creation, was part of the túath of Ui Donnchad. The Ui Donnchad, or sept the Mac Giolla Mocholmog, was also home to Vikings of Dublin (Dyflyn) who were allies and trading partners of the Chieftain Dermot Mac Giolla Mocholmog during the century period. Following the initial Hiberno-Norman policy of integration and assimilation, the descendants of this chief became the FitzDermots. Through grants and intermarriage, by the time of the shiring of County Dublin, Newcastle-Lyons was raised to the status of an Irish feudal barony. In 1627 a disputed claim to the barony led to tragedy when Edmond Butler, 3rd/13th Baron Dunboyne killed his rival James Prendergast; James' brother Edmond was recognised as baron, but later forfeited. It eventually came into the Newcomen family who secured succession in the seventeenth century. The village and castle bawn was fortified with walls and multiple tower houses. It later became a pocket borough until the Parliamentary Union of Dublin with Westminster in the United Kingdom of Great Britain and Ireland in 1801. After the Union, and the famine, the Barony like Dublin City and County went into a long period of economic and population decline.

== Civil parishes ==
- Aderrig
- Clondalkin
- Esker
- Kilbride
- Kilmactalway
- Kilmahuddrick (a single townland)
- Leixlip
- Lucan
- Newcastle
- Rathcoole
- Saggart

== See also ==
- List of subdivisions of County Dublin
