= Fingal =

County in Ireland

Coordinates: 53.4597°N 6.2181°W

Fingal Fine Gall (Irish)
- County
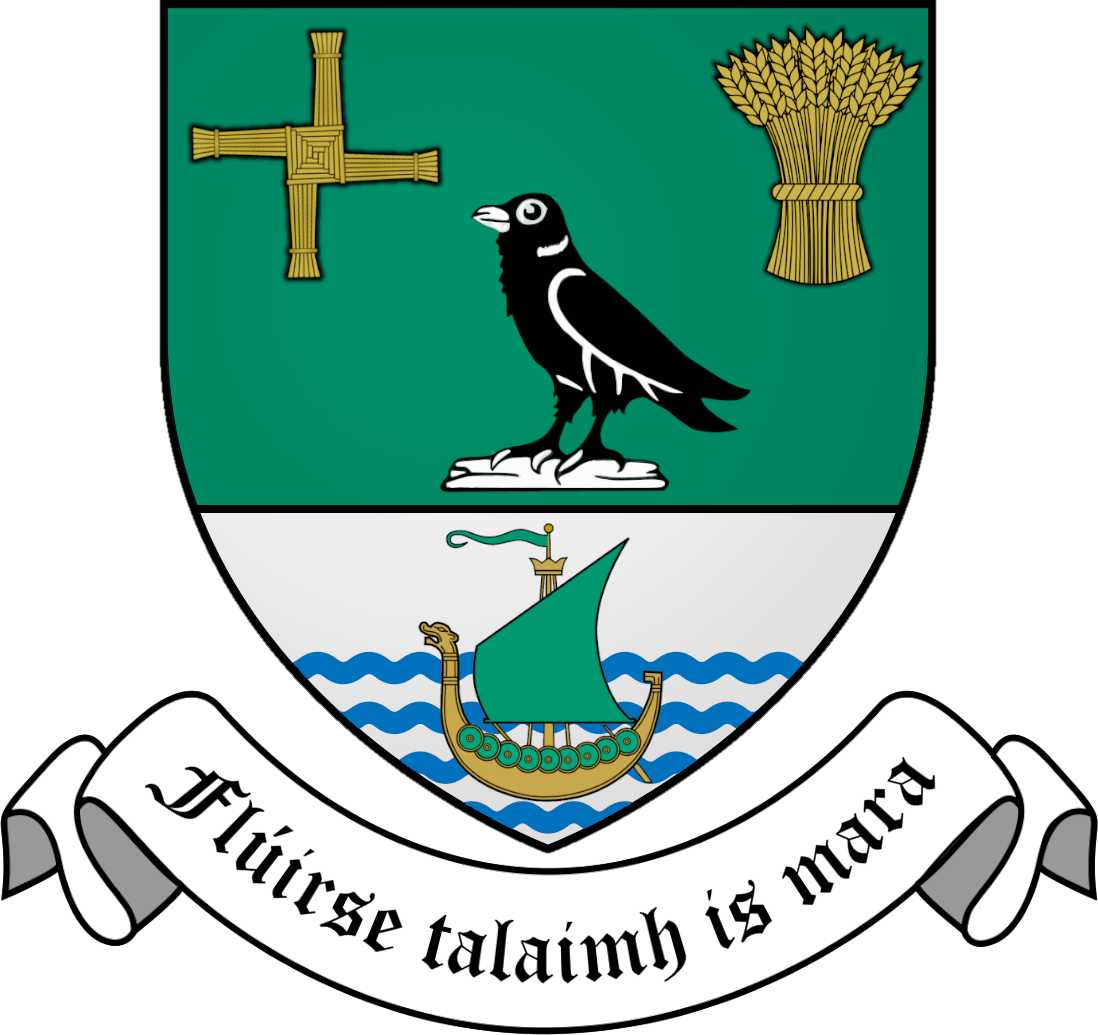
- Coat of arms
- Motto(s): Flúirse Talaimh is Mara (Irish) "Abundance of Land and Sea"
- Interactive map of Fingal
- Country: Ireland
- Province: Leinster
- Region: Eastern and Midland
- Established: 1994
- County town: Swords

Government
  - Local authority: Fingal County Council
  - Dáil constituencies: Dublin Bay North; Dublin Fingal; Dublin North-West; Dublin West
  - EP constituency: Dublin

Area
  - Total: 456 km^{2} (176 sq mi)
- Highest elevation (Knockbrack): 176 m (577 ft)

Population (2022)
  - Total: 330,506
  - Density: 725/km^{2} (1,880/sq mi)
- Time zone: UTC±0 (WET)
  - Summer (DST): UTC+1 (IST)
- Eircode: D9, D11, D15, K32, K34, K36, K45, K56, K67
- Telephone area codes: 01
- Vehicle index mark code: D
- Website: Official website

Fingal (English: /ˈfɪŋɡɔːl/ FING-gawl; from Irish Fine Gall, meaning 'foreign tribe') is a county in Ireland. It is in the province of Leinster and is part of the Eastern and Midland Region. It is one of three successor counties to County Dublin, which was disestablished for administrative purposes in 1994. Its name is derived from the medieval territory of Scandinavian foreigners (Irish: gaill) that settled in the area. Fingal County Council is the local authority for the county. In 2022 the population of the county was 330,506, making it the second most populated council in Dublin and the third most populous county in the state.

== Geography and subdivisions ==
Fingal is one of three counties into which County Dublin was divided in 1994. Swords is the county town. The other large urban centre is Blanchardstown. Smaller towns include Balbriggan and Malahide. Suburban villages with extensive housing include Baldoyle, Castleknock, Howth (and Sutton), Lusk, Donabate, Portmarnock, Skerries. Small rural settlements exist in the northern and western parts of the county. The motto of the arms of Fingal reads Irish: Flúirse Talaimh is Mara meaning "Abundance of Land and Sea". The motto reflects the strong farming and fishing ties historically associated with the area. It also features a Viking longboat, which represents the arrival of the Norse in Fingal, where they became integrated with the existing Irish. Fingal is bordered by County Meath to the north, by Kildare to the west and by Dublin city to the south. At the Strawberry Beds, the River Liffey separates the county from South Dublin.

=== Towns and villages ===
Fingal varies enormously in character, from densely populated suburban areas of the contiguous Dublin metropolitan region to remote rural villages and small, unpopulated agricultural townlands.

- Balbriggan
- Baldoyle
- Balscaddan
- Ballyboughal
- Bayside
- Blanchardstown
- Castleknock
- Clonsilla
- Corduff
- Donabate
- Garristown
- Hollystown
- Howth
- Loughshinny
- Lusk
- Malahide
- Man O' War
- Mulhuddart
- Naul
- Oldtown
- Ongar
- Portmarnock
- Portrane
- Rush
- Rolestown
- St. Margaret's
- Skerries
- Swords
- Sutton
- Tyrrelstown

The northernmost parts of Ballymun, Santry and Finglas are also part of Fingal. Clonee, part of County Meath, has housing estates in its hinterland that merge into the estates of Ongar in western Fingal.

=== Baronies and civil parishes ===
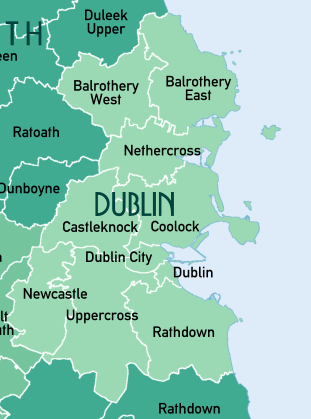
Baronies of County Dublin

The former county of Dublin was divided into nine baronies. The part of Fingal within County Dublin was in later centuries subdivided into the following administrative baronies: Balrothery West, Balrothery East, Nethercross, Castleknock and Coolock. While baronies continue to be officially defined units, they are no longer used for many administrative purposes. The last boundary change of a barony in Dublin was in 1842, when the barony of Balrothery was divided into Balrothery East and Balrothery West. Their official status is illustrated by Placenames Orders made since 2003, where official Irish names of baronies are listed under "Administrative units". The boundaries of Fingal do not respect the boundaries of the baronies. As a result, only three baronies are entirely contained in the county: Balrothery East, Balrothery West, and Nethercross. Parts of three baronies are also contained in the county: Castleknock, Coolock, and Newcastle.

In the case of Castleknock, most civil parishes of the barony are under the jurisdiction of Fingal County Council. Some of the eastern parishes are under the jurisdiction of Dublin City Council. The core of the civil parish of Finglas lies within Dublin City. There are two substantial exclaves of the parish proper that are located in Fingal.

In the case of Coolock, most civil parishes of the barony are in Dublin City. The parishes listed in the table below are located in Fingal.

Name in Irish	Name in English	Area in Acres
Baile Dúill	Baldoyle.	450
Baile Ghrífín	Balgriffin.	540
Binn Éadair	Howth.	1772
Cionn Sáile	Kinsaley.	1339
Clochrán	Cloghran.	994
Mullach Íde	Malahide.	606
Port Mearnóg	Portmarnock.	1020
Sord	Swords.	5
Teampall Mhaighréide	St. Margaret's	1140

In the case of Newcastle, most of the barony is situated south of the River Liffey and so is under the jurisdiction of South Dublin County Council. Six townlands are located north of the Liffey in the civil parish of Leixlip. Listed in the table below, they are part of Fingal.

Name in Irish	Name in English	Area in Acres
Coill Alain	Allenswood	210
–	Coldblow	279
Láithreach Con	Laraghcon	295
–	Pass-If-You-Can	88
Páirc San Caitríona	Saint Catherine's Park	195
Baile an Bhaspailigh	Westmanstown	437

== History ==
=== Terminology and etymology ===
The name "Fingal" derives from the medieval territory of Fine Gall (tribe or territory of foreigners), the Viking settlement north of Dublin. The Vikings referred to the hinterland of Dublin as Dyflinarskiri.

In Ireland, the usage of the word county nearly always comes before rather than after the county name; thus "County Clare" in Ireland as opposed to "Clare County" in Michigan, US. In the case of those counties created after 1994, they often drop the word county entirely, or use it after the name; internet search engines show many more uses (on Irish sites) of "Fingal" than of either "County Fingal" or "Fingal County". The local authority uses all three forms.

Fingallian is an extinct language, a hybrid of Old and Middle English and Old Norse, with Leinster Irish influences. It was spoken by the people of Fingal until the mid-19th century.

Fingal is within the part of the Eastern and Midland Regional Assembly, established in 2015, one of three such regional assemblies in the state. Within that, it is part of the Dublin strategic planning area.

=== Early Gaelic history ===
In the 2nd century AD, Ptolemy identified Eblana (Dublin) as the capital of a people called the Eblani. In later centuries the territory north of the river Liffey was known as Mide or Midhe, i.e. "the Kingdom of Meath" (that to the south was known as Coigh Cuolan or Cualan). The west of this area was known as Teffia, and the east as Bregia (Latinised from Gaelic Magh Breagh, "the great plain of Meath"). Bregia comprised five Gaelic triocha-cheds (equivalent to cantreds) or the later baronies, and was ruled by the king at Tara. These princes, and various Gaelic chieftains, held sway over the area until the coming of the Vikings in the 8th century.

=== Vikings and Hiberno-Norse ===
By 841 AD a Scandinavian settlement had been established at Dublin; this was abandoned in 902, re-established in 917, and developed thereafter. It was so established by the 11th century that it was regarded even amongst the surrounding native Gaelic population as a minor kingdom ruled by Hiberno-Norse kings. The Norse Kingdom of Dublin stretched, at its greatest, from Drogheda to Arklow, and while mostly a thin strip of coastal land, from the Irish Sea westwards as far as Leixlip in the central part.

After the Battle of Clontarf, when High King Brian Boru curtailed the power of the Vikings in Ireland, the Norse-Irish Kingdom of Dublin continued, with its own bishop, part of the Westminster hierarchy rather than the Irish, though it gradually came under the influence of the Kings of Leinster. Diarmait Mac Murchada established himself there before his expulsion by the High King in 1166, a series of events that led to the area being invaded in the late 12th century, by the Cambro-Normans. This was to form part of the heartland of the area known as The Pale during the successive periods of rule by Anglo-Norman and the later kings of England.

=== After the Anglo-Norman invasion ===
==== Early Anglo-Norman grants ====
With the arrival of the Anglo/Cambro-Normans in 1169, the territory of the old Gaelic Kingdom of Meath was promised in around 1172 to Hugh de Lacy by King Henry II of England. At that time, Meath extended to most of the current county of Fingal (including as far as Clontarf, Santry and the barony of Castleknock), County Westmeath and part of County Kildare. Fingal was therefore implicitly included in the grant of "Meath" either as part of Meath proper or under the additional element of that grant "and for increase to the gift, all fees which he has or shall acquire about Dublin". This element of the grant related to his role as Bailiff and was copied into the Gormanston Register.

Strongbow was probably also assigned some fees within the royal demesne of Dublin, as in the case of Hugh de Lacy's custodianship of Dublin, in payment of his services. This appears evidenced by several grants which he made in his own name within the city to St. Mary's Abbey, and his foundation of a hospital of St. John of Jerusalem at Kilmainham. Therefore, both Strongbow and Hugh de Lacy exercised lordships within the royal demesne of Dublin.

In addition to Dublin city, the royal demesne itself also consisted of the royal manors of Crumlin, Esker, Newcastle, and Saggart, in the south-west of the county, and the royal demesnes of O Thee (O'Teig), O Brun (O'Broin), and O Kelly (O'Ceallaigh) in the south-east of the county, which were rented from the Crown by Irish-speaking tenants. Over half of the land in the county of Dublin was granted to religious houses and priories, as well as archbishops and monasteries, and minor lay lords. In such a way too, an estate was given to the Irish chieftain MacGillamocholmog, who held sway over the territory of Cualann (Wicklow) when the Anglo-Normans arrived.

De Lacy parcelled out most of this land to his vassals, who were to hold these lands from him, as he had held the Lordship of Meath from King Henry, by military tenure. D'Alton also provides a reference to the enumeration of these grants given in Hibernica, by Harris (pp. 42–43). Hugh de Lacy was appointed Viceroy in 1178, and again in 1181 after a brief period of royal disfavour.

By virtue of his grant of Meath, Hugh de Lacy was appointed a Palatine Count in that territory and divided it amongst his various vassals who were commonly called "De Lacy's Barons". These were: Hugh Tyrell, Baron of Castleknock; Jocelyn de Angulo, Baron of Navan and Ardbraccan; De Misset, Baron of Lune; Adam de Feypo, Baron Skryne; Fitz-Thomas, Baron of Kells; Hussey, Baron of Galtrim; Richard de Fleming, Baron Slane; Adam Dullard or Dollard, of Dullenvarty; Gilbert de Nugent, Baron Delvin and later Earl of Westmeath;Risteárd de Tiúit, Baron of Moyashell; Robert de Lacy's descendants, Barons of Rathwire; De Constantine, Baron of Kilbixey Petit, Baron of Mullingar; Meyler FitzHenry of Maghernan, Rathkenin, and Ardnocker. As Burke points out, to some of these there descended the De Genevilles, Lords of Meath; Mortimer, Earl of March (and later Lord of Trim, from De Geneville); the Plunkets, of Danish descent, Baron of Dunsany and of Killeen, and later Earl of Louth and Earl of Fingall (by letters patent); the Prestons, Viscounts Gormanston and Viscount Tara, the Barnewalls, Baron Trimlestown and Viscount Barnewall; the Nettervilles, Barons of Dowth; the Bellews, Barons of Duleek; the Darcys of Platten, Barons of Navan; the Cusacks, Barons of Culmullin; the FitzEustaces, Baron Portlester. Some of these again were succeeded by the De Baths of Athcarn, the Dowdalls of Athlumny, the Cruises, the Drakes of Drake Rath, and others.

==== John of England ====
In 1184, Prince John, the Lord of Ireland and Earl of Mortain gave half the tithes of Fingal to the episcopal see of Dublin, which grant was confirmed in 1337 by King Edward, and in 1395 by King Richard II when in Dublin.

John featured prominently in the tales of Robin Hood during the reign of Richard I of England, absent on the Third Crusade. In 1189, on the breaking up of Robin Hood's company, Robin Hood's companion Little John, is said to have exhibited his feats of archery on Oxmanstown Green in Dublin, until having been detected in a robbery, he was hanged on Arbour Hill nearby. Another Robin Hood–type, known as McIerlagh Gedy, is recorded as a notorious felon responsible for many thefts and incendiary acts in Meath, Leinster, and Fingal, and was taken prisoner, brought to Trim Castle and hanged.

Walter de Lacy, Lord of Meath, son of Hugh, gained seisin of the Lordship of Meath by charter in 1194 during Richard I's exercise of the Lordship of Ireland, having previously been a minor when his father Hugh de Lacy died in 1186. Walter succeeded to all Hugh's lordships, including of Fingal, which by a grant of King John in 1208 was subsequently confirmed in perpetuity under the same terms as the palatine Lordship of Meath, and no longer limited by the original conditions linked to service as bailiff of Dublin.

=== Feudal administration ===
==== Prescriptive Barony, 1208 ====
In 1208 the Lordship of Fingal was granted to Walter de Lacy by King John of England.

The first known administrative provision related to the original name was a palatine grant of the Paramount Lordship of Fingal, confirmed by letters patent from King John. This feudal barony or Prescriptive barony was granted to Walter de Lacy and his heirs in perpetuity in 1208. The grant was based on Hugh de Lacy, Walter's father, having held the same on a basis of grand serjeanty for his services as bailiff to the King. The grant describes the scope of administrative responsibility, and the limits of powers delegated. The gist of the grant is recounted as follows:

Grant and confirmation to Walter de Lascy, on his petition, of his land of Meath; to hold of the King in fee by the service of 50 knights; and of his fees of Fingal, in the vale of Dublin; to hold in fee by the service of 7 knights; saving to the King pleas of the Crown, appeals of the peace, & c., and crociae, and the dignities thereto belonging; the King's writs to run throughout Walter's land. Further grant to Walter of the custody of his fees, although the lords thereof hold elsewhere in capite; saving to the King the marriages of the heirs of those fees.

==== County Dublin ====
In the 1208 grant, the bulk of Fingal, considered to be "in the vale of Dublin", was part of the County Dublin, when the latter was established as one of the first twelve counties created by King John during his visit to Ireland in 1210. Its history forms part of that of County Dublin for the following eight centuries.

==== Other derivative or related grants and titles ====
As mentioned above, by the time John granted Fingal as part of his inheritance to Walter, Walter's father Hugh had already sub-infeudated parts thereof to his vassals (e.g. the Castleknock barony, granted by Hugh de Lacy to Hugh Tyrell, etc.). Therefore, Fingal was already a superior lordship (or paramount barony) when originally granted, consisting of lesser baronies (and their several manors), even though some of these may have been granted by Hugh in his capacities as Bailiff or as Viceroy, and later confirmed as held of the Crown in capite, and in perpetuity. The Lordship of Fingal was, therefore, a paramount superiority over several sub-infeudated smaller baronies (such as Castleknock, Santry, Balrothery), and thus eventually accrued vicecomital attributes.

In addition, several other baronies existed as feudal holdings or were created within the geographical territory of Fingal (such as Finglas; Swerdes Swords; Santry, Feltrim), and in other parts of Dublin: Howth and Senkylle (Shankill in southern Dublin).

A later, related, development was the granting of the first viscountcy in Ireland in 1478 to a Preston, Lord Gormanston, the Premier Viscount of Ireland, who at the time was a major landowner in the Fingal area, and a direct descendant of Walter de Lacy. That viscountcy was called after Gormanston as the latter was the principal seat and Manor of the Prestons at the time, having been acquired upon their relinquishment of occupancy of the Manor of Fyngallestoun. The Viscounts Gormanston continued to retain the Lordship of the latter under reversion., and the prescriptive barony of Fingal was also retained by the Viscount Gormanston as an incorporeal hereditament in gross, until passed to the late Patrick Denis O'Donnell, and thence to his son, gazetted in England as Lord O'Donnell of Fingal.

==== Medieval taxation, and the Pale ====
Geographically, Fingal became a core area of the Pale, and that part of Ireland was most intensively settled by the Normans and in due course the English. Records during the period 1285–92, of rolls of receipts for taxes to the King, indicate Fingal as a distinct area, listed along with the baronies or lordships of Duleek, Kells, and Loxuedy, as well as Valley (Liffey), and sometimes under, sometimes separate from Dublin. Later records of rolls of receipts e.g. "granted to the King in Ireland of the term of Trinity a.r.21 (1293)" for the period 1293–1301 also include references to Fingal listed as a lordship, again along with the baronies of Duleek and Kells, and Dublin City, and Valley, all listed under Dublin County. Several other references also exist in the chancery records of the 14th century.

==== Abolition of feudal system ====
The feudal system was finally completely abolished by the Land and Conveyancing Law Reform Act 2009. The Act abolished feudal tenure, but preserved estates in land, including customary rights and incorporeal hereditaments.

==== Earldom of Fingall ====
A title in the peerage of Ireland of Earl of Fingall was created in 1628 by Charles I, and granted to Luke Plunket, 1st Earl of Fingall, Baron Killeen, whose first wife, Elizabeth Plunket née FitzGerald, thus became Lady Killeen The Plunketts also intermarried with the Prestons, Viscounts Gormanston. The Fingall Estate Papers, acquired by the Fingal County Archives, do not however relate to any properties in Fingal, but rather to lands in Meath. That Fingall title became extinct upon the death of the 12th and last Earl in 1984, along with a peerage barony of the same name, not to be confused with the titular prescriptive barony of Fingal previously mentioned.

=== Modern county ===
The island of Ireland, showing location of Fingal.

In 1985, County Dublin was divided into three electoral counties: Dublin–Belgard to the southwest, Dublin–Fingal to the north, and Dún Laoghaire–Rathdown to the southeast. At the 1991 local election, the area of Dublin–Fingal was renamed as Fingal.

On 1 January 1994, under the Local Government (Dublin) Act 1993, the old County Dublin ceased to exist and was succeeded by three counties:

- Dún Laoghaire–Rathdown
- Fingal
- South Dublin

Under the 1993 Act, Fingal County Council (together with Dún Laoghaire–Rathdown County Council and South Dublin County Council) became one of the three "successor" councils to Dublin County Council.

Under the Local Government Act 2001, Fingal is determined and listed as a county. The Placenames Committee maintains the Placenames Database of Ireland, which records all placenames, past and present. The former county of Dublin is listed in the database along with the subdivisions of that county; Fingal, with its subdivisions, is also listed.

== Governance and politics ==
Fingal County Council is the local authority for the county, established on 1 January 1994 by the same law that created the county. It succeeded the functions of Dublin County Council in the former electoral county of Fingal, which was abolished by the Local Government (Dublin) Act 1993. It is one of four councils in the traditional County Dublin. The County Hall is in Swords, with another major office in Blanchardstown. The county administration is headed by a Chief Executive, leading a team of functional heads and directors of services. The county council is governed by the Local Government Act 2001. The council has 40 elected members who are elected by single transferable vote in elections held every 5 years.

Fingal County Council sends three representatives to the Eastern and Midland Regional Assembly.

For elections to Dáil Éireann, the following Dáil constituencies are wholly contained within the county: Dublin Fingal West (3 seats); Dublin Fingal East (3 seats); Dublin West (5 seats). Parts of the following constituencies are also contained in the county: Malahide and Howth in Dublin Bay North (5 seats); and small parts of Mulhuddart in Dublin North-West (3 seats).

== Economy ==
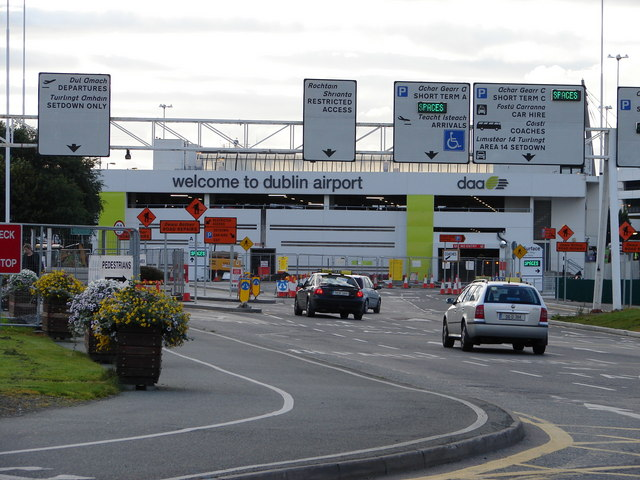
Sign to Dublin Airport

Fingal is Ireland's primary horticultural region, producing 50% of the national vegetable output and 75% of all glasshouse crops grown in the country. However, the areas of production are coming under severe pressure from other development and the rural towns are increasingly becoming dormitories for the city. Howth Harbour is the biggest fishing harbour on the east coast and the fifth largest in the country.

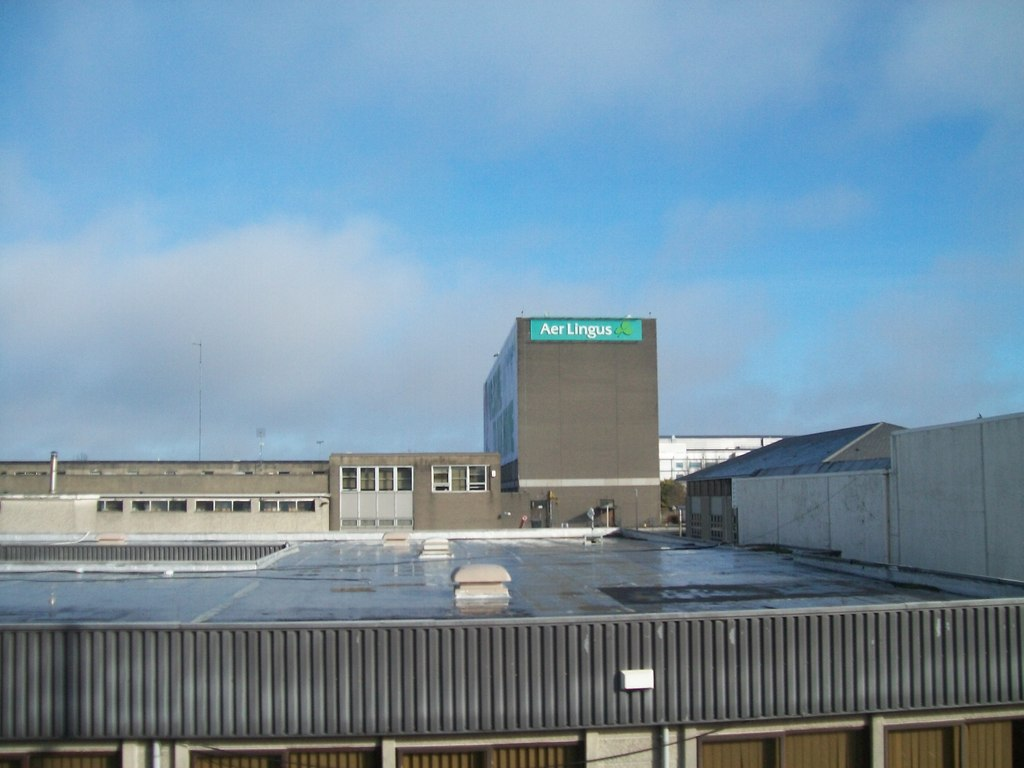
Aer Lingus head office

Dublin Airport is located within the county, along with the headquarters of Aer Lingus and Ryanair. The Dublin Airport Authority has its head office on the grounds of the airport. In addition Swords has the headquarters of ASL Airlines, CityJet, and Ingersoll Rand.

In 2006 Fingal County Council was lauded by prominent Irish construction industry figures, politicians and EU Energy Commissioner Andris Piebalgs for becoming the first local authority in Ireland to introduce mandatory sustainable building requirements. The policy, which relates to all construction in 8 parts of the county—including roughly 13,000 new homes—stipulates that the amount of energy and CO_{2} emissions associated with the heating and hot water of all buildings must be reduced by at least 60% compared to Irish Building Regulations, with at least 30% of the energy used for heating and hot water coming from renewable sources such as solar, geothermal or biomass.

== Demographics ==
Main immigrant groups, 2016
Nationality	Population
United Kingdom	12,196
Poland	10,615
Romania	5,455
Lithuania	3,490
Nigeria	3,115
Latvia	2,751
India	2,574
Philippines	1,937
Moldova	1,425
China	1,102

Between 2006 and 2022, Fingal's population grew by approximately 37.7%, compared to 21.4% nationally. As of the 2022 census, the Fingal local authority area had a population of 330,506.

== Education ==
The Technological University Dublin formerly known as the Institute of Technology, Blanchardstown is the largest third-level education facility in Fingal.

== Sport ==
Fingal is home to Morton Stadium, Ireland's national athletics stadium and 2003 Special Olympics venue.

Between 2007 and 2011 Morton Stadium hosted the home matches of the former soccer team Sporting Fingal F.C.

The county has many GAA teams which are still organised under the County Dublin GAA since the political county changes have not affected the GAA Counties (see Gaelic Athletic Association county). However, a team representing Fingal as county has competed against GAA counties as a sub-region of the GAA county of Dublin in the Kehoe Cup, Division 2B (as of 2014) of the Allianz National Hurling League and (in the past) the Nicky Rackard Cup.

== Bibliography ==
- Fingal and its Churches – A Historical Sketch, by Robert Walsh, M. A., Dublin and London, 1888.
- Rotuli Chartarum in Turri Londinensi Asservati, edited by Thomas Duffus Hardy, published in 1837. (Available in the Tower of London and in the Guildhall Library, London, it contains the original text of the Grant of Fingal by King John in 1208).
- The Calendar of the Gormanston Register, Royal Society of Antiquaries of Ireland, edited by James Mills and M.J. McEnery, University Press, Dublin, 1916. The Gormanston Register is a collection of ancient manuscripts going back to the 12th century, belonging to the Viscounts Gormanston, and now lodged in the National Library of Ireland, in Dublin.
- History of Killeen Castle, by Mary Rose Carty, published by Carty / Lynch, Dunsany, County Meath, Ireland, April 1991 (ISBN 0-9517382-0-8). This includes a history of the Earls of Fingall – page 18 refers to Lucas Plunket, the 1st Earl of Fingall, whose first wife is given as Elizabeth O'Donnell of Tyrconnell, but she was, in fact, a FitzGerald, sister of Bridget FitzGerald
- Blood Royal – From the time of Alexander the Great to Queen Elizabeth II, by Charles Mosley (genealogist), published for Ruvigny Ltd, London, 2002 (O'Donnell listed as Baron of Fyngal, page v) ISBN 0-9524229-9-9
- History of the County of Dublin, by Francis Elrington Ball, Dublin, 1902.
- History of the County of Dublin, by John D'Alton, Hodges and Smith, Dublin, 1838.
- Allen, F. H. A.; Whelan, Kevin, eds. (1992). Dublin City and County – From Prehistory to Present. Dublin: Geography Publications. p. 89. ISBN 0-906602-19-X.
- Seventy Years Young, Memoirs of Elizabeth, Countess of Fingall, by Elizabeth Burke-Plunkett, Lady Fingall. First published by Collins of London in 1937; 1991 edition published by The Lilliput Press, Dublin 7, Ireland ISBN 0-946640-74-2. This Elizabeth was a Burke from Moycullen in County Galway, who married the 11th Earl of Fingall, and should not be confused with Elizabeth Plunket (née FitzGerald), Baroness Killeen, first wife of Luke Plunket, the later 1st Earl of Fingall (1604–1611).
- The Scandinavian Kingdom of Dublin, by Charles Haliday, edited by John P. Prendergast, published by Alex. Thom & Co., Printers and Publishers, Dublin, 1881.
- Debrett's Peerage and Baronetage 1995, edited by Charles Kidd and David Williamson, published by Debrett's Peerage Limited, Macmillan, London, 1995 UK: ISBN 0-333-41776-3; ISBN 0-333-62956-6; US: ISBN 0-312-12557-7
