= R122 road (Ireland) =

Road in Ireland

R122 road
- Bóthar R122

Location
- Country: Ireland

Highway system
- Roads in Ireland; Motorways; Primary; Secondary; Regional

The R122 road is a regional road in Dublin, Ireland.

The official description of the R122 from the Roads Act 1993 (Classification of Regional Roads) Order 2012 reads:

R122: Finglas - Balbriggan, County Dublin

Between its junction with R104 at Saint Margaret's Finglas and its junction with R108 at Westown via Newtown, Shanganhill, Kilresk Bridge, Skephubble, Chapelmidway Bridge, Kilsallaghan, Newbarn, Fieldstown Bridge, Wren's Nest Cross, Oldtown, Wyanstown, Grallagh and Curragh West all in the county of Dublin

and

between its junction with R108 at Naul in the county of Dublin and its junction with R132 at Drogheda Street in the town of Balbriggan via Reynoldstown, Newtown, Rowans Little and Clogheder; and Chapel Street in the town of Balbriggan all in the county of Dublin.

== See also ==
- Roads in Ireland
- National primary road
- National secondary road
- Regional road
