= Balscaddan =

Village in Fingal, County Dublin, Ireland

Balscaddan Baile na Scadán (Irish)
- Village
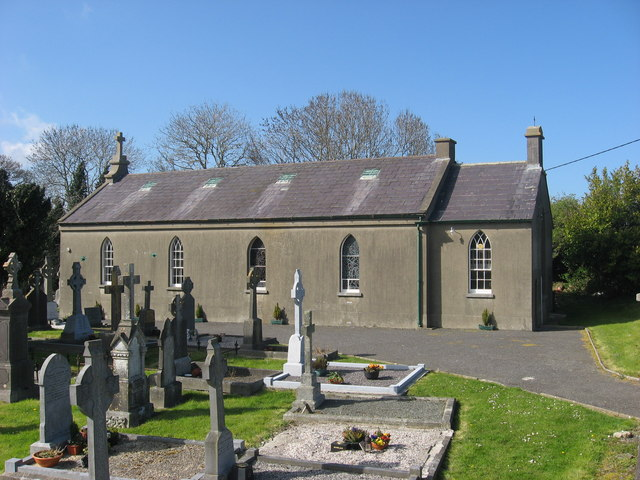
- Church of the Assumption of Our Lady

- Location in Ireland
- Coordinates: 53°36′36″N 6°11′02″W
- Country: Ireland
- Province: Leinster
- County: County Dublin
- Local government area: Fingal

Population (2006)
  - Urban: 653
- Time zone: UTC+0 (WET)
  - Summer (DST): UTC-1 (IST (WEST))

Balscaddan (Irish: Baile na Scadán, meaning 'the town of the herrings', also spelt Balscadden) is a village in Fingal, Ireland. It is the most northerly village of County Dublin, approximately 5 km north of Balbriggan and close to the border with County Meath.

Balscaddan is also the name of the townland around the village, and the civil parish of which it is part.

The district has a population of under 700 people, and the area around the village is completely rural in character, although close to the expanding Balbriggan.

The village is not to be confused with Balscaddan Bay which is located on Howth Head and which takes its name from the same source.

== History ==
Balscadden village is said to derive its name from the Irish Baile na Scadán (The Town of the Herrings); despite this, the village is situated at least two miles from the coast. Local tradition relates that in days gone by herrings were transported inland from a small fishing port, in the townland of Bremore, commonly called Balscadden Bay or "Cromwell's harbour". The fish was prepared at Balscadden village for transportation to the Dublin market.

Balscaddan was the birthplace of Saint Benignus, a disciple of Saint Patrick who later became the Archbishop of Armagh in the 5th century.

== Sport ==
Balscadden FC was formed in 2006 and currently plays in the AUL Division 1. The team plays its home games at the Ringcommon Sports centre and consists of players from the Balscaddan and Balbriggan areas. O'Dwyers GAA is the local Gaelic Athletic Association club.

== Education ==
Balscadden has one mixed primary school, St. Benignus National School, located in the village which caters for approximately 250 pupils.

== Religion ==
Balscadden is a parish in the Fingal North deanery of the Roman Catholic Archdiocese of Dublin. The parish church is the Church of the Assumption of Our Lady.

The original church in Balscadden was built in 1412. However, it was destroyed by soldiers led by Oliver Cromwell during his reign of terror. The present church was built in 1819 at a total cost of IR£500, as a symbol of the Balscadden community's resilience and determination. Today, its rustic nature makes it a very popular venue for weddings.

The Church of Ireland Church of Balscaddan was merged with Balrothery parish in 1871.

== See also ==
- List of towns and villages in Ireland
