= Coolock (barony) =

Historical administrative division of County Dublin, Ireland

Coolock (Irish: An Chúlóg) (Note: Barony of Coolock) is one of the baronies of Ireland. It was constituted as part of the old county of Dublin. Today, it covers much of the northern parts of the city of Dublin and the south-eastern part of the modern county of Fingal. At the heart of the barony is the civil parish of the same name - Coolock - which is one of twenty civil parishes in the barony.

== Legal context and history ==
Baronies were created after the Norman invasion of Ireland as subdivisions of counties and were used for administration. While baronies continue to be officially defined units, they are no longer used for many administrative purposes. They have been administratively obsolete since 1898. Nevertheless, they continue to be used in land registration and specification such as in planning permissions. In many cases, a barony corresponds to an earlier Gaelic túath which had submitted to the Crown. However, the status of barony is still used in modern times

== Location ==
It is one of seven and a half baronies that used to comprise the old county of Dublin. It stretches from Dublin Airport and the Malahide estuary to the Royal Canal and River Tolka estuary (from north to south) and from the Phoenix Park to Dublin Bay (from west to east). It is located between the baronies of Nethercross (to the north), Castleknock (to the west) and Dublin City (to the south). The northern two-thirds of the barony is now administered by Fingal County Council while the southern third is subject to Dublin City Council.

=== Civil parishes ===
For convenience, the table below groups the barony's twenty civil parishes by their location in one of the modern local authority areas. Some parishes, however, straddle both areas.

Name in Irish	Name in English	Area in Acres 1	Modern Local Authority Area
Ard Aidhin	Artaine. (Note: Artaine civil parish)	557	Dublin City
Cill Bharróg	Kilbarrack. (Note: Kilbarrack civil parish)	Note 1	Dublin City
Cill Easra	Killester. (Note: Killester civil parish)	150	Dublin City
Cluain Tarbh	Clontarf. (Note: Clontarf civil parish)	535	Dublin City
Cluain Torc	Clonturk. (Note: Clonturk civil parish)	800 Note 2	Dublin City
Gráinseach Ghormáin	Grangegorman. (Note: Grangegorman civil parish)	450	Dublin City
Paróiste San Seoirse	St George's. (Note: St George's civil parish)	Note 3	Dublin City
Glas Naíon	Glasnevin. (Note: Glasnevin civil parish)	600	Dublin City
An Chúlóg	Coolock. (Note: Coolock civil parish)	1199	Dublin City
Ráth Eanaigh	Raheny. (Note: Raheny civil parish)	440	Dublin City
Seantrabh	Santry. (Note: Santry civil parish)	2350	Dublin City
Baile Dúill	Baldoyle. (Note: Baldoyle civil parish)	450	Fingal
Baile Ghrífín	Balgriffin. (Note: Balgriffin civil parish)	540	Fingal
Binn Éadair	Howth. (Note: Howth civil parish)	1772	Fingal
Cionn Sáile	Kinsaley. (Note: Kinsaley civil parish)	1339	Fingal
Clochrán	Cloghran. (Note: Cloghran civil parish)	994	Fingal
Mullach Íde	Malahide. (Note: Malahide civil parish)	606	Fingal
Port Mearnóg	Portmarnock. (Note: Portmarnock civil parish)	1020	Fingal
Sord	Swords. (Note: Swords civil parish)	5 Note 4	Fingal
Teampall Mhaighréide	St. Margaret's (Note: St. Margaret's civil parish)	1140	Fingal

Note 1 In 1773, during the reign of King George III of Great Britain, the parishes were assessed as having the acreage as set out in the above table. In addition, the parishes of Kilossory and Kilbegh are mentioned as being in the barony with 900 and 500 acres respectively. Today, Killossory is in the barony of Nethercross but the date of its presumed transfer from this barony is unknown. The identity of Kilbegh is unclear although Kilbarrack may be a candidate. The source makes no mention of St George's parish.
Note 2 The parish of Clonturk is now mainly identified with the district of Drumcondra.
Note 3 The parish is St George is split between this barony and the barony of the City of Dublin. That part of the parish which lies in Coolock is bounded by the River Tolka to the north, Dublin Bay to the east and the Royal Canal to the south.
Note 4 An exclave of the parish of Swords lies in the barony. It is a single parcel of land, just over 5 acres in area - the townland of Glebe. (Note: Glebe townland) Today, it is the site of the Metropoint Business Park.

The table below lists the population and the number of houses in the various civil parishes according to the 1851 census of Ireland.

Civil Parish.	Population in 1851.	Number of Houses in 1851.
Artaine	345	77
Baldoyle	1131	231
Balgriffin	523	97
Cloghran	462	89
Clontarf	2682	449
Clonturk	2630	459
Coolock	943	161
Glasnevin	1340	178
Grange Gorman (part of)	971	178
Howth	1715	328
Kilbarrack	242	42
Killester (incl. Artaine town)	400	71
Kinsaley	648	119
Malahide	1341	271
Portmarnock	602	101
Raheny	548	117
St Georges (part of)	1297	198
St Margarets	412	78
Santry	1140	194
Swords (part of)	3	1
