= Castleknock (barony) =

Former administrative land unit in the former county of Dublin, Ireland

The barony of Castleknock (Irish: Caisleán Cnucha meaning "Cnucha's Castle") (Note: Barony of Castleknock) is one of the baronies of Ireland. Originally part of the Lordship of Meath, it was then constituted as part of County Dublin. Today, it is in the modern county of Fingal, Ireland. The barony was originally also a feudal title, which became one of the subsidiary titles of the Viscounts Gormanston.

== History ==
The barony was created by Hugh de Lacy, Lord of Meath, as his own feudal barony, to be held directly from himself in capite (his vassals were commonly called "De Lacy's Barons"). The first vassal was Hugh Tyrrel in 1177. It was held for three and a half knight's fees, owed to the superior Lord of Fingal. The title and lands of Castleknock were held by the Tyrell family until 1370 when Robert Tyrell, the eighth Baron and his wife died of the plague, leaving two daughters and co-heiresses, Joan and Matilda. The lands later passed to the Viscount Gormanston.

== Location ==
At the heart of the barony is the civil parish of the same name - Castleknock - which is one of eight civil parishes in the barony. In the townland of Castleknock itself is the location of the eponymous "Cnucha's Castle" - Castleknock Castle. The town with the biggest population in the barony is Blanchardstown. It is one of seven and a half baronies that used to comprise the old county of Dublin. It stretches from Cabra to Blanchardstown (from east to west) and from Finglas to Chapelizod (from north to south).

The Castleknock barony is located between the baronies of Coolock to the east, Nethercross to the north and Dublin to the southeast. The River Liffey separates it from the remaining baronies of County Dublin. With the exception of the parish of Chapelizod, the remainder of the barony is contained within the modern county of Fingal and it is subject to Fingal County Council.

== Legal context ==
Baronies were created after the Norman invasion of Ireland as subdivisions of counties and were used for administration. At the time of its creation, Castleknock was part of the Lordship of Meath. While baronies continue to be officially defined units, they are no longer used for many administrative purposes. While they have been administratively obsolete since 1898, they continue to be used in land registration, and specifications such as in planning permissions. In many cases, a barony corresponds to an earlier Gaelic túath which had submitted to the Crown. This is probably true in the case of Castleknock.

== Civil parishes ==
=== Civil parish of Castleknock ===
What is now the parish of Castleknock was granted to Hugh Tyrrel by Hugh de Lacy, Lord of Meath. Copies of the grant were discovered in the London Public Records Office in 1933 by Eric St. John Brooks. In English, the grant reads:

Henry, by the grace of God, King of England, Lord of Ireland, Duke of Aquitaine and Normandy and Count of Anjou to the Archbishops, Bishops, Ministers and all Earls, Barons, Justices, Sheriffs, Ministers and all his faithful French, English and Irish, greeting. Know that I have conceded, given, and by present Charter confirmed to Hugh Tirel, the man of Hugh de Lacy, Thwothyn and Thwothrom.

Brooks deduces that "Thwo" is an Anglicisation of the Gaelic word túath and that "throm" is an Anglicisation of the word droma which means ridge or hill - a possible reference to the hill of Castleknock where Tyrrell was to build his castle.

Townlands in the civil parish of Castleknock: (Note: Castleknock civil parish)

Townland	Acres	Image Description	Image
Abbotstown; Baile an Aba (Note: Abbotstown townland)	101	Abbotstown cemetery	
Annfield; Gort Anna (Note: Annfield townland)	351	Apartment buildings in Annfield	
Ashtown; Baile an Ásaigh (Note: Ashtown townland)	285	Moorings on the Royal Canal	
Astagob; Steach Gob (Note: Astagob townland)	76	The Wren's Nest pub	
Blanchardstown; Baile Bhlainséir (Note: Blanchardstown townland)	351	Village crossroads in 2020	
Cabragh; An Chabrach (Note: Cabragh townland)	351	Primary Care Centre on the Navan Road	
Carpenterstown; Baile an Chairpintéaraigh (Note: Carpenterstown townland)	166	Stone placename on the Carpeterstown Road	
Cappoge or Cappagh; Ceapach (Note: Cappagh townland)	698	Halting site	
Castleknock; Caisleán Cnucha (Note: Castleknock townland)	1020	St Bridget's; Church of Ireland	
Castleknock (incl. part of Phoenix Park); Caisleán Cnucha (cuid de Pháirc an Fhionnuisce) (Note: Castleknock (incl. part of Phoenix Park) townland)	787	Dawn, Mountjoy Cross towards Castleknock gate	
Corduff; An Chorr Dhubh (Note: Corduff townland)	353	A "fairy fort" in the townland	
Deanestown; Baile an Déanaigh (Note: Deanestown townland)	173	Entrance to Waterville Park	
Diswellstown; Baile an Diosualaigh (Note: Diswellstown townland)	418	Diswellstown stream in the south-eastern corner of the townland	
Dunsink; Dún Sinche (Note: Dunsink townland)	351	Dunsink observatory	
Huntstown * Baile an Huntaigh (Note: Huntstown townland)	299		
Johnstown; Baile Sheáin (Note: Johnstown townland)	67		
Mitchelstown; Baile Mhistéil (Note: Mitchelstown townland)	154	Car showroom at Mitchelstown Road	
Pelletstown; Baile Pheiléid (Note: Pelletstowntownland)	259	Sculpture of "The Lock Keeper"; Rathborne village, 10th lock Royal Canal	
Porterstown; Baile an Phóirtéaraigh (Note: Porterstown townland)	219	Porterstown Park in lockdown - Apr 2020	
Scribblestown; Baile Scriobail (Note: Scribblestown townland)	272	Candlemaker, Rathbornes Candles	
Sheephill; Cnoc na gCaorach (Note: Sheephill townland)	112	Abbotstown House in Sheephill (not Abbotstown proper)	
Snugborough; Snugborough (Note: Snugborough townland)	53		

- Not to be confused with Huntstown in Mulhuddart.

=== Civil parish of Chapelizod ===
Chapelizod contains a single townland of the same name. However, 465 acres are within the walls of the Phoenix Park while the village proper, outside the walls, contains only 67 acres. It is the only part of the barony that is not within the modern county of Fingal. It is administered by Dublin City Council.

Townland	Acres	Image Description	Image
Chapelizod (Note: Chapelizod civil parish)	465	Within Phoenix Park; St Mary's Hospital	
Chapelizod	67	Outside the walls Chapelizod village	The village of the townland of Chapelizod

=== Civil parish of Cloghran ===
The parish of Cloghran consists of three townlands. (Note: Cloghran civil parish) Most of the land in the parish is taken up with the "Ballycoolen Industrial Estate".

Townland	Acres	Image Description	Image
Ballycoolin (Note: Ballycoolen townland)	511	Eastern end	
		Petrol station at the northern end	
Cloghran (Note: Cloghran townland)	95		
Grange (Note: Grange townland)	171		

=== Civil parish of Clonsilla ===
Townlands in the civil parish of Clonsilla: (Note: Clonsilla civil parish)

Townland Name English & Irish	Acres	Image Description	Image
Astagob; Steach Gob	162	Rugged Lane	
Barberstown (Note: Barberstown townland); Baile an Bhearbóraigh	166	Before the restoration of the rail spur to Hansfield	
Barnhill; Cnoc an Sciobóil	190	Packenham Bridge (Royal Canal)	
Blakestown; Baile an Bhlácaigh	104		
Broomfield; Gort na Giolcaí	24	Entrance gates	
Clonsilla; Cluain Saileach	382	St Mary's (Church of Ireland)	
Casteheany (Note: Casteheany townland); Teach Chainnigh	302	Coláiste Pobail Setanta	
Coolmine; Cúil Mhín	609	Coolmine Community School	
Hansfield or Phibblestown (Note: Hansfield or Phibblestown townland); Baile Fiobail nó Páirc Hans	223	Ongar Village	
Hartstown (Note: Hartstown townland); Baile an Hartaigh	181	Hartstown; Community School	
Kellystown; Baile Uí Cheallaigh	174		
Sheepmoor; Móinteán na gCaorach	161	Entrance to Portersfield estate	
Woodlands (Note: Woodlands or Lutteralstown townland); Fearann na Coille	571	Luttrellstown; Golf Club House	

Note 1 The largest population centre in Castaheany / Hansfield is Ongar.

=== Civil parish of Finglas ===
The 34 townlands of the parish of Finglas are split among two baronies. (Note: Finglas civil parish) The core village and two smaller parcels of land - exclaves of the village - lie in Castleknock. An additional exclave lies in Nethercross.

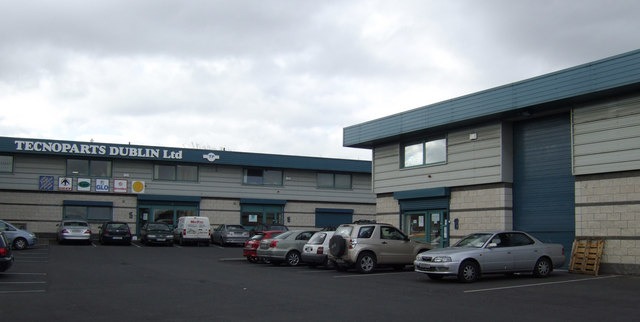
Trading estate in the townland of Ballyboggan South

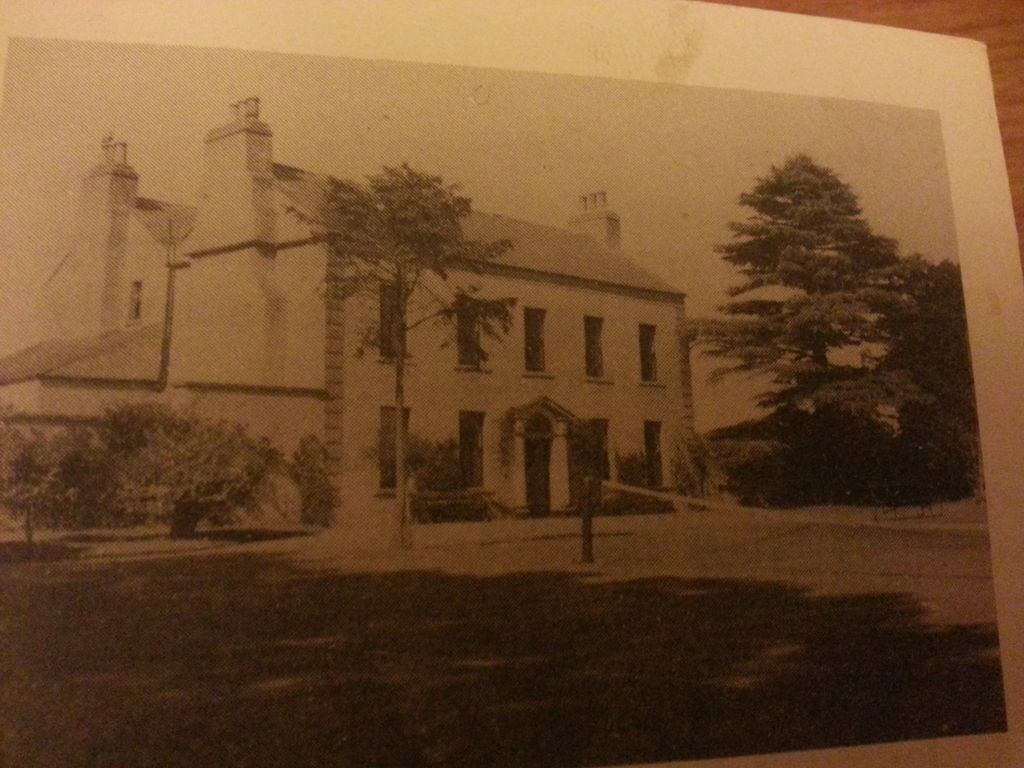
Ballygall House in the townland of Ballygall

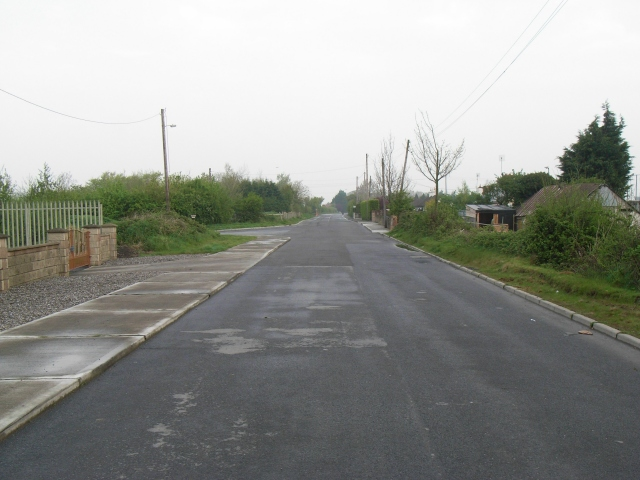
Old N2 road at the townland of Balseskin

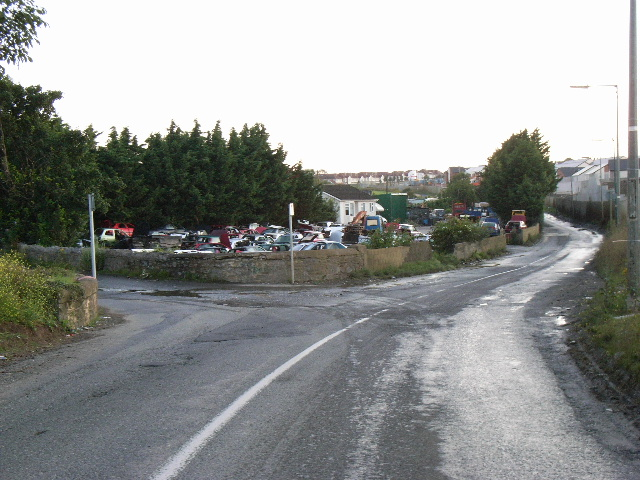
Breaker's yard in the townland of Cardiffsbridge

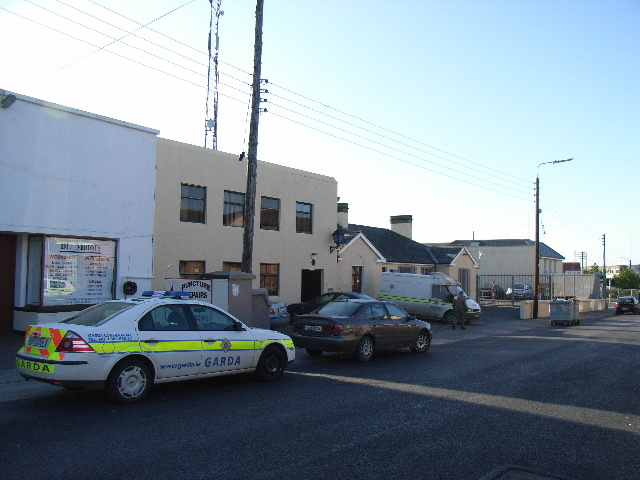
Garda station in the townland of Cardiffscastle

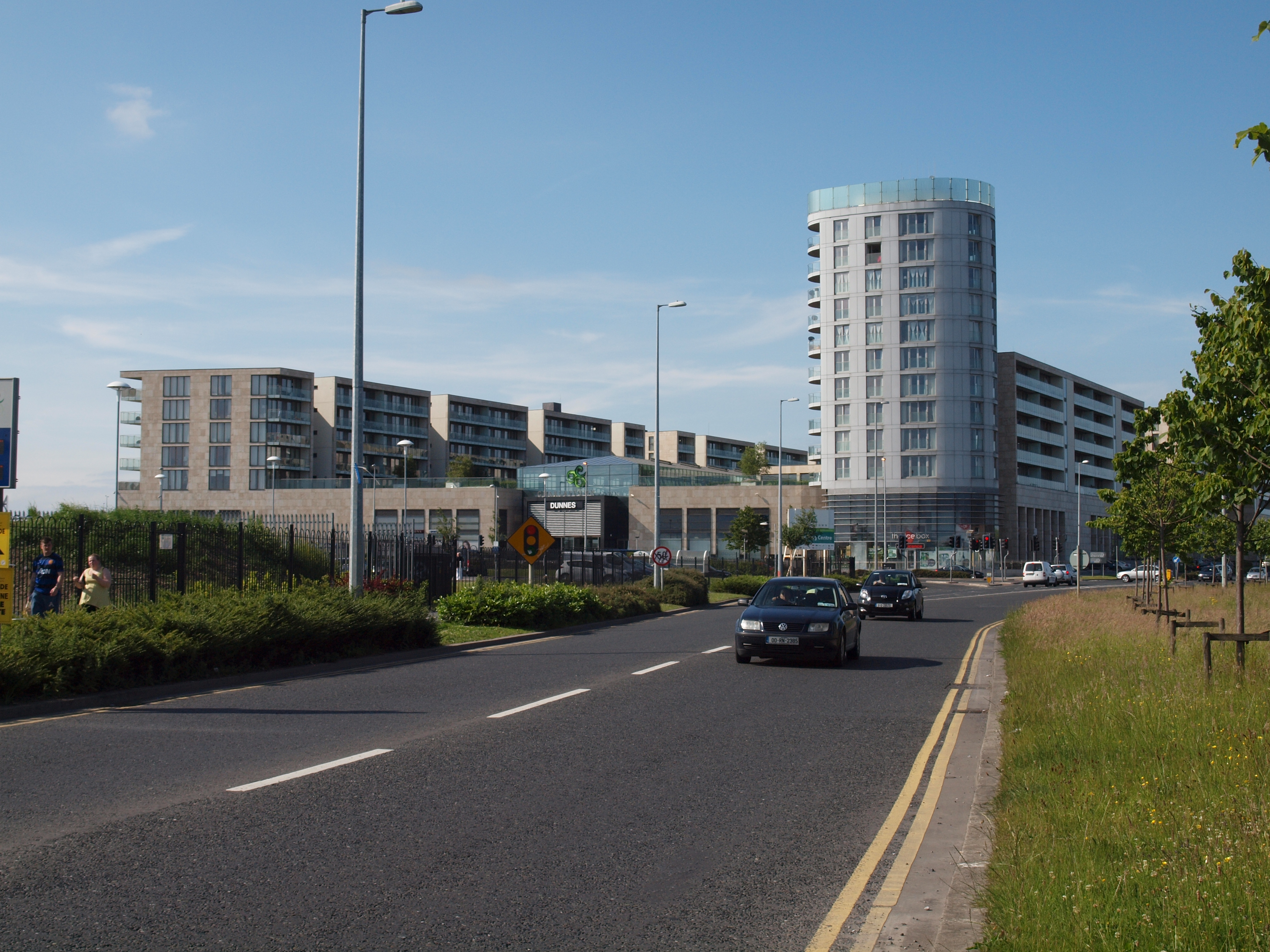
Charlestown Shopping Centre in the townland of Charlestown

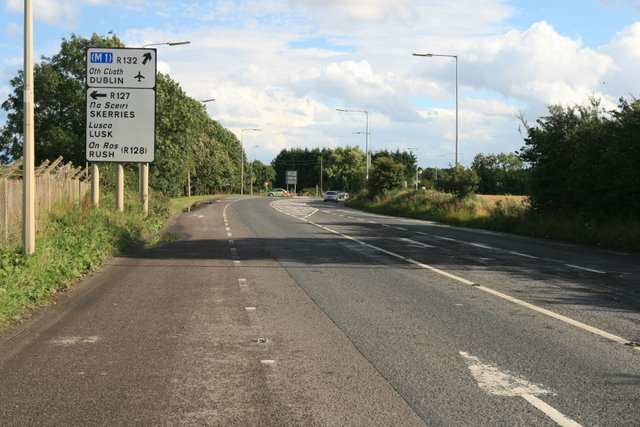
Old N1 road at the townland of Coldwinters

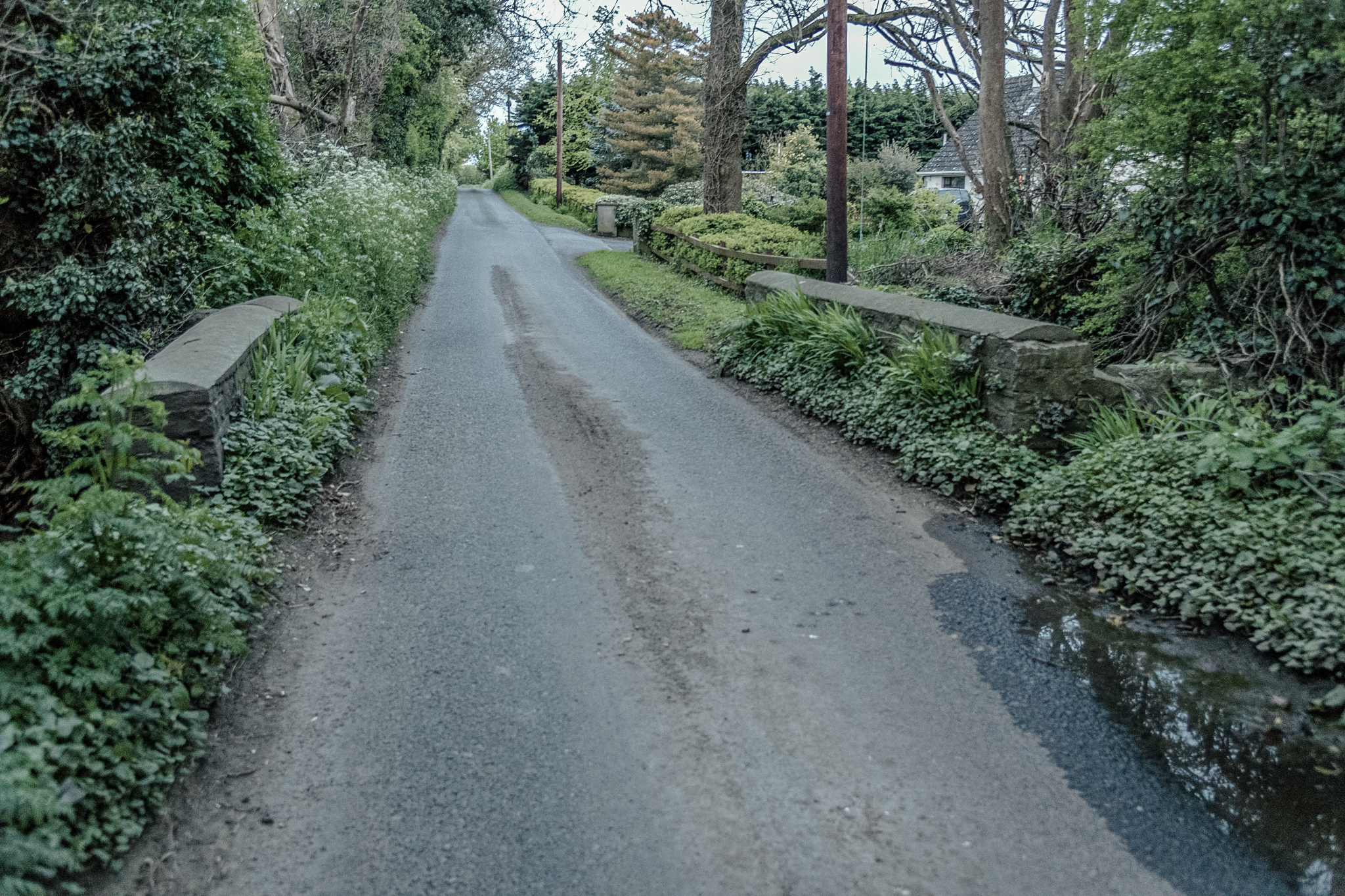
Bridge in the townland of Kilreesk

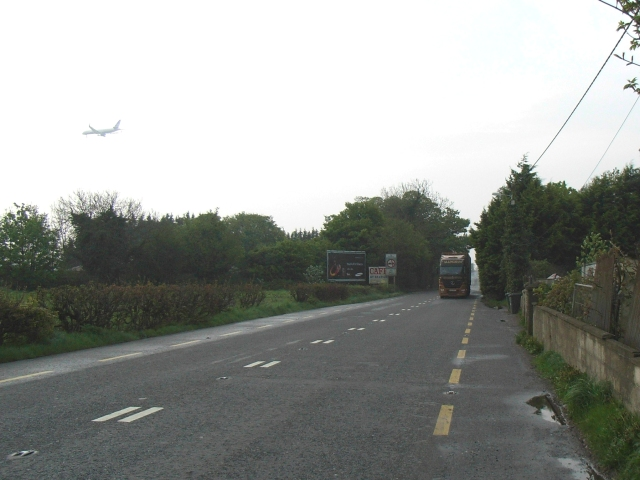
Old N2 road at the townland of Kilshane

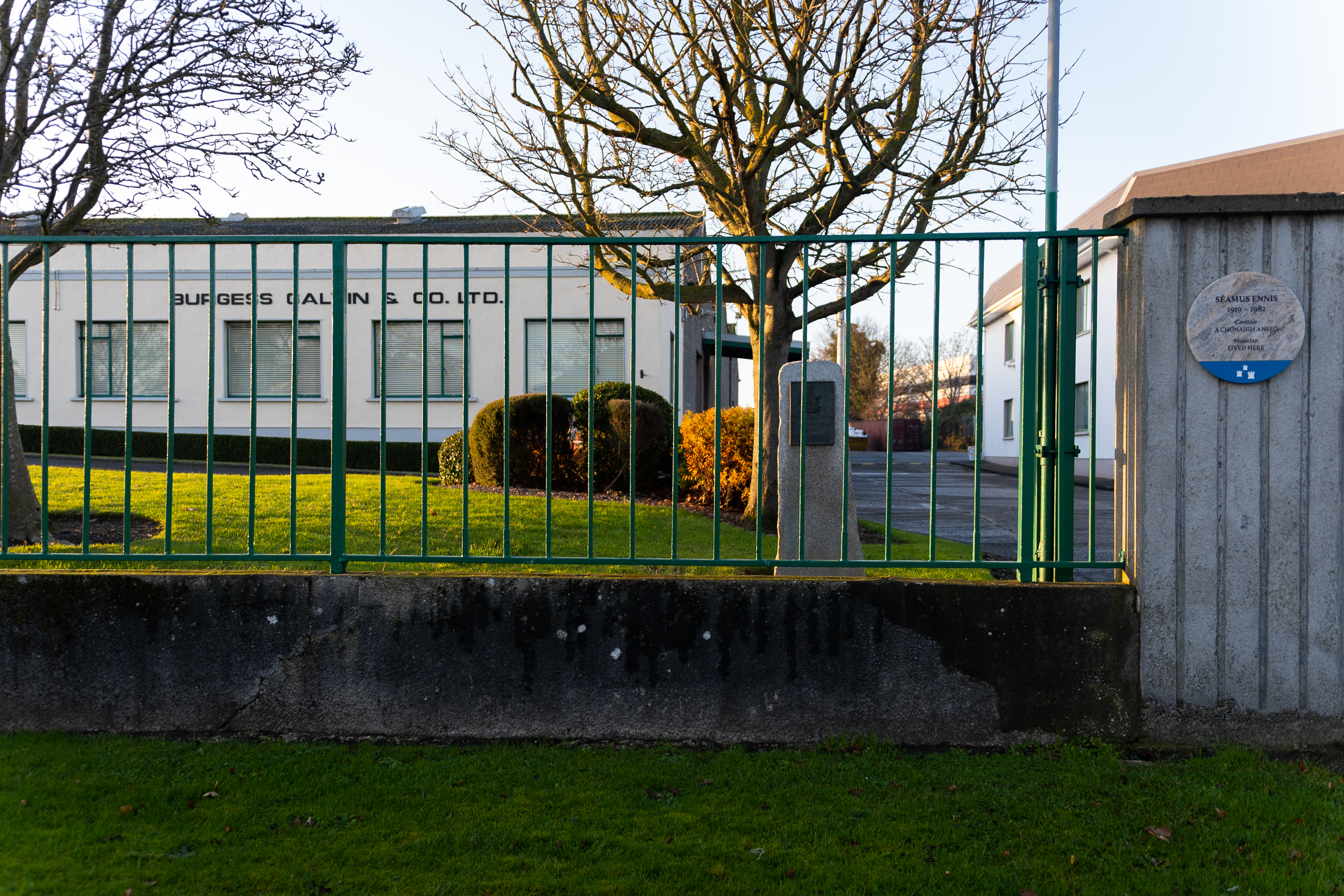
Seamus Ennis plaque in the townland of Jamestown Little

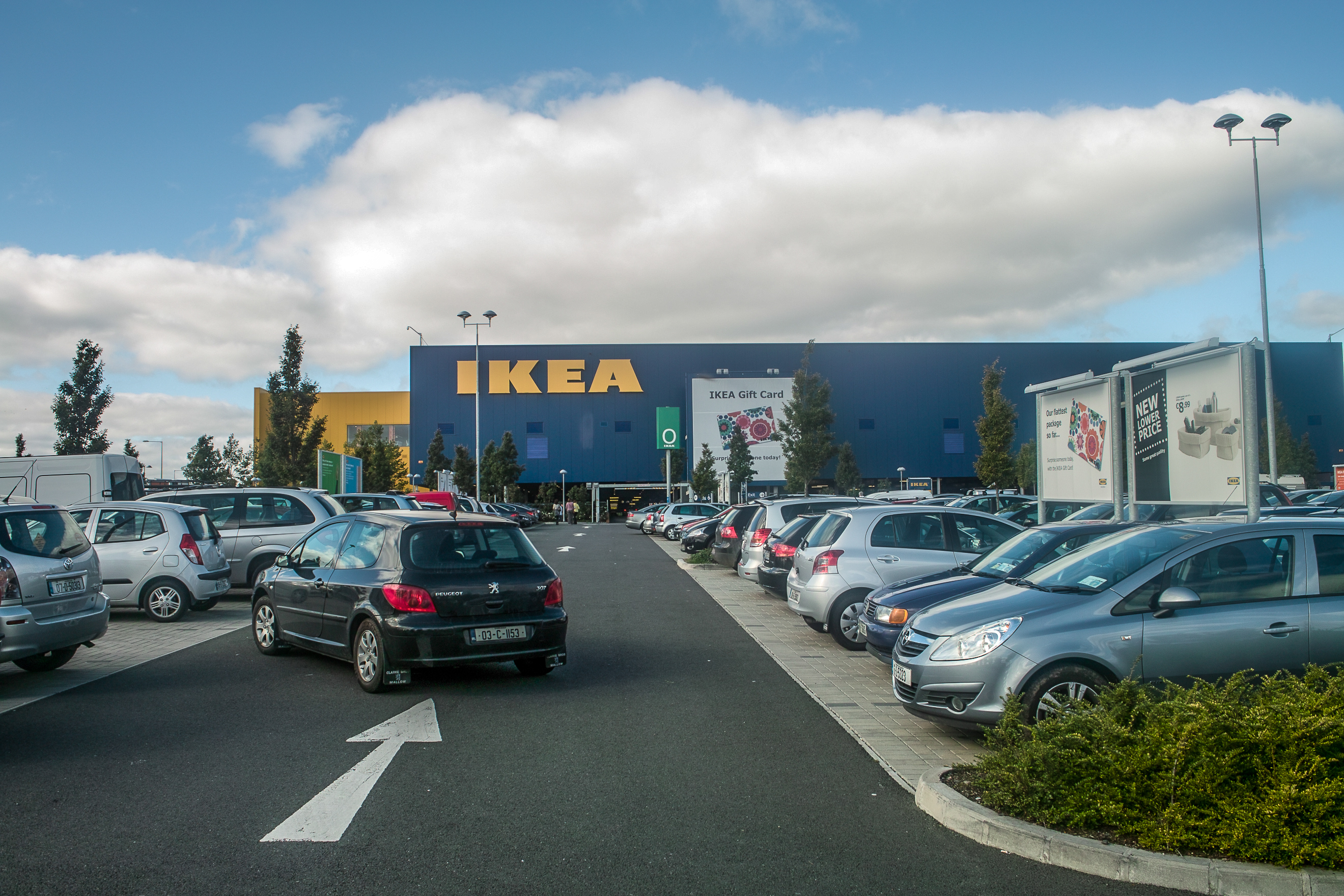
IKEA store in the townland of Poppintree

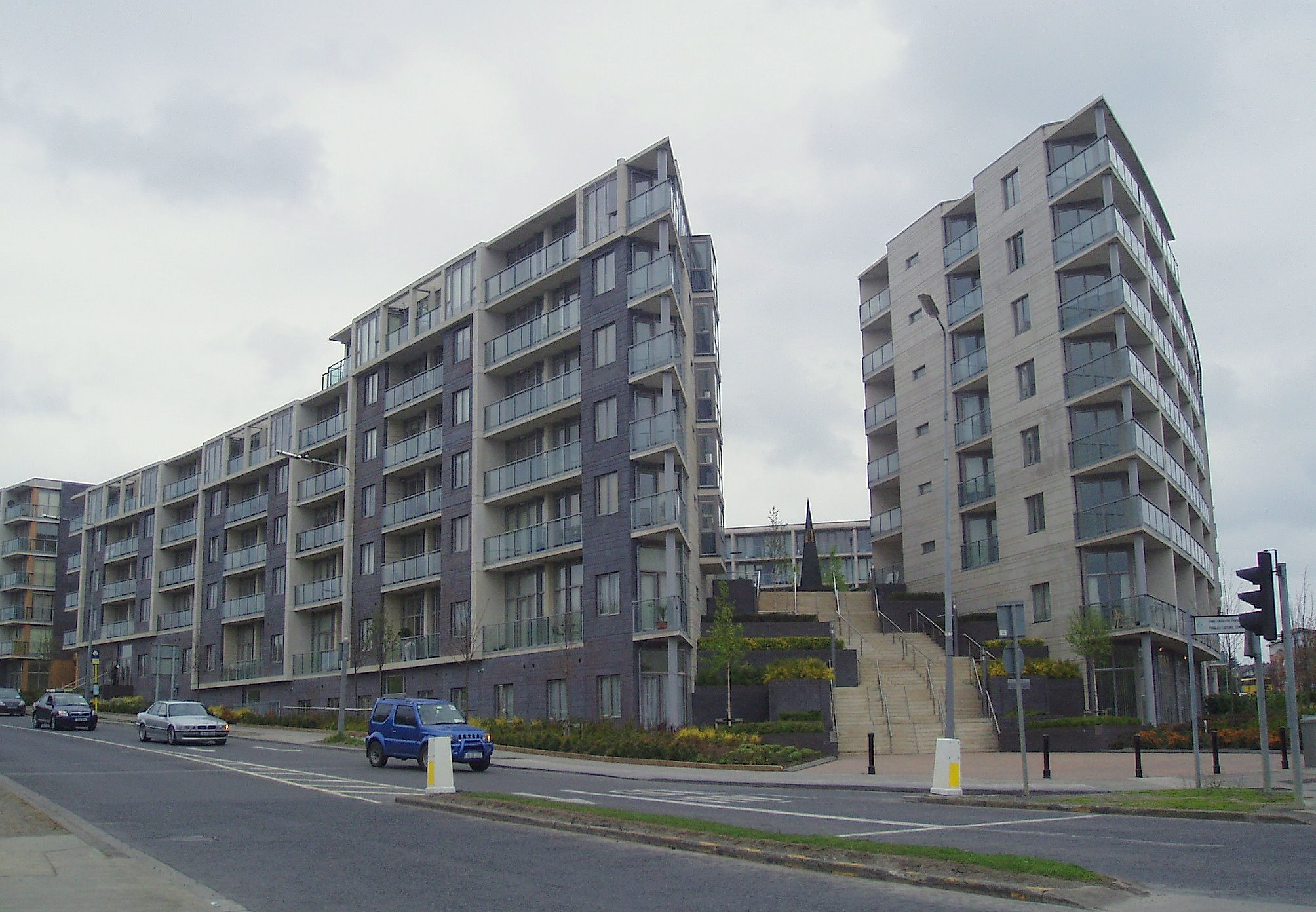
Prospect apartment blocks in the townland of Tolka

=== Civil parish of Mulhuddart ===
Mulhuddart has 22 townlands, including: (Note: Mulhuddart civil parish)

Townland	Acres	Image Description	Image
Buzzardstown (Note: Buzzardstown townland)	298	Institute of Technology Blanchardstown	
Littlepace (Note: Littlepace townland)	97	Shopping centre	
Damastown (Note: Damastown townland)	351	IBM car park	
Gallanstown		Road to Belgree near Hollystown	
Huntstown		Road in Deerhaven estate	
Hollystown (Note: Hollystown townland)	196	Hollystown Golf Club	
Macetown Middle		Damastown Avenue	
Macetown South		Damastown Way	
Moorestown		Dolly Heffernan's pub	
Powerstown (Note: Powerstown townland)	358	Road in Powerstown	
Tyrrelstown (Note: Tyrrelstown townland)	427	Houses in Tyrrelstown	
Yellow Walls		Field overlooking housing estate in Hollystown.	

=== Civil parish of Saint James' ===
The bulk of Saint James' parish (Note: Saint James' civil parish) lies south of the River Liffey. A single townland, situated north of the river in the Phoenix Park, is part of the barony of Castleknock.

- Saint James' (part of Phoenix Park); (Note: Saint James' (part of Phoenix Park) townland) the eastern part containing the Magazine Fort, the Zoological Gardens, the Wellington Monument and the Criminal Courts of Justice.

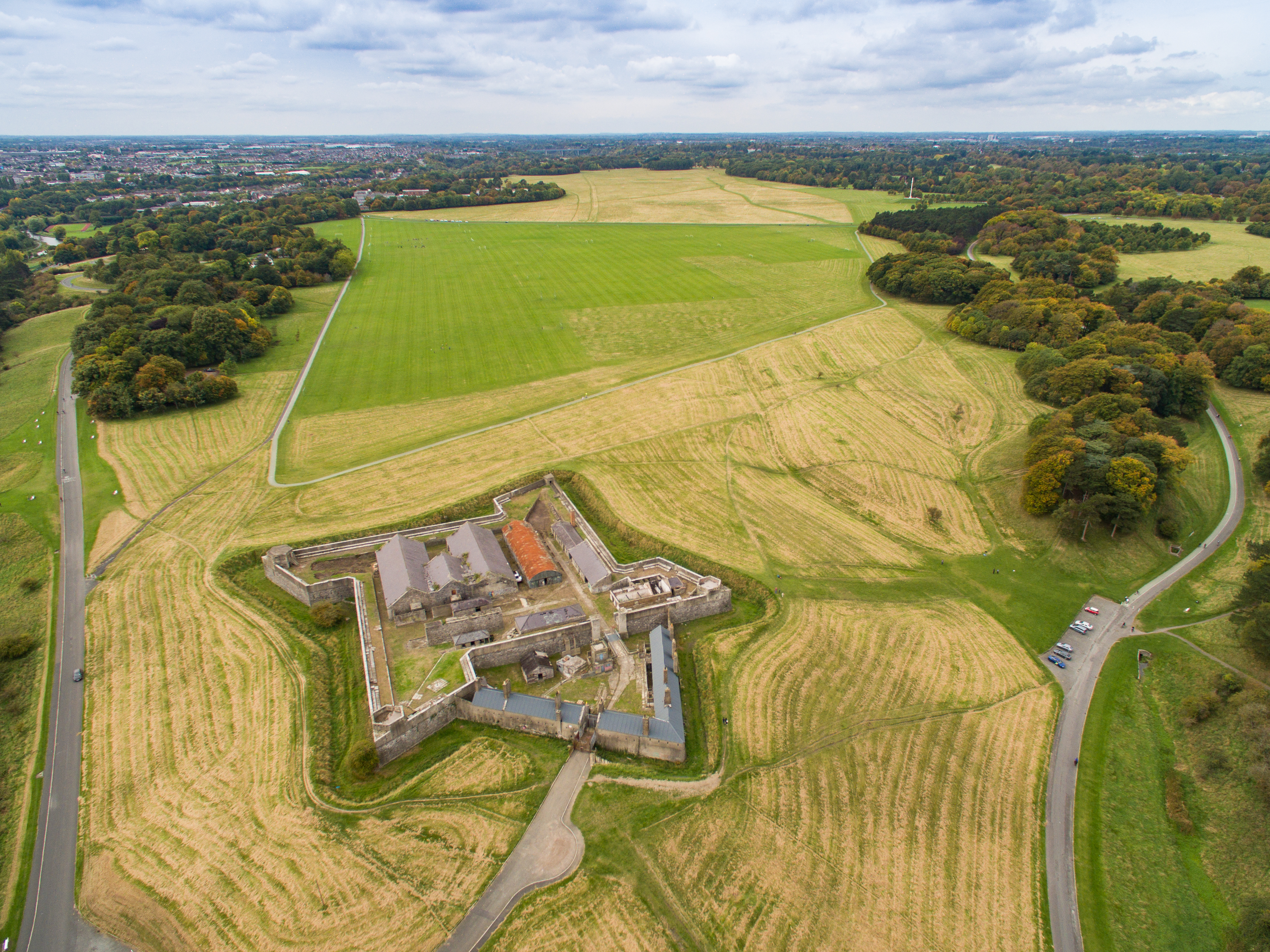
Magazine Fort, part of the townland of Phoenix Park

=== Civil parish of Saint Judes' ===
The bulk of Saint Judes' (Note: Saint Judes' civil parish) parish lies south of the River Liffey. A single townland, situated north of the river, is part of the barony of Castleknock. It was carved out of the parish of Saint James'.

- Longmeadows (Note: Longmeadows townland) which is the strip of land between the Park walls and the river from its narrowest pinch point to Islandbridge on the South Circular Road.

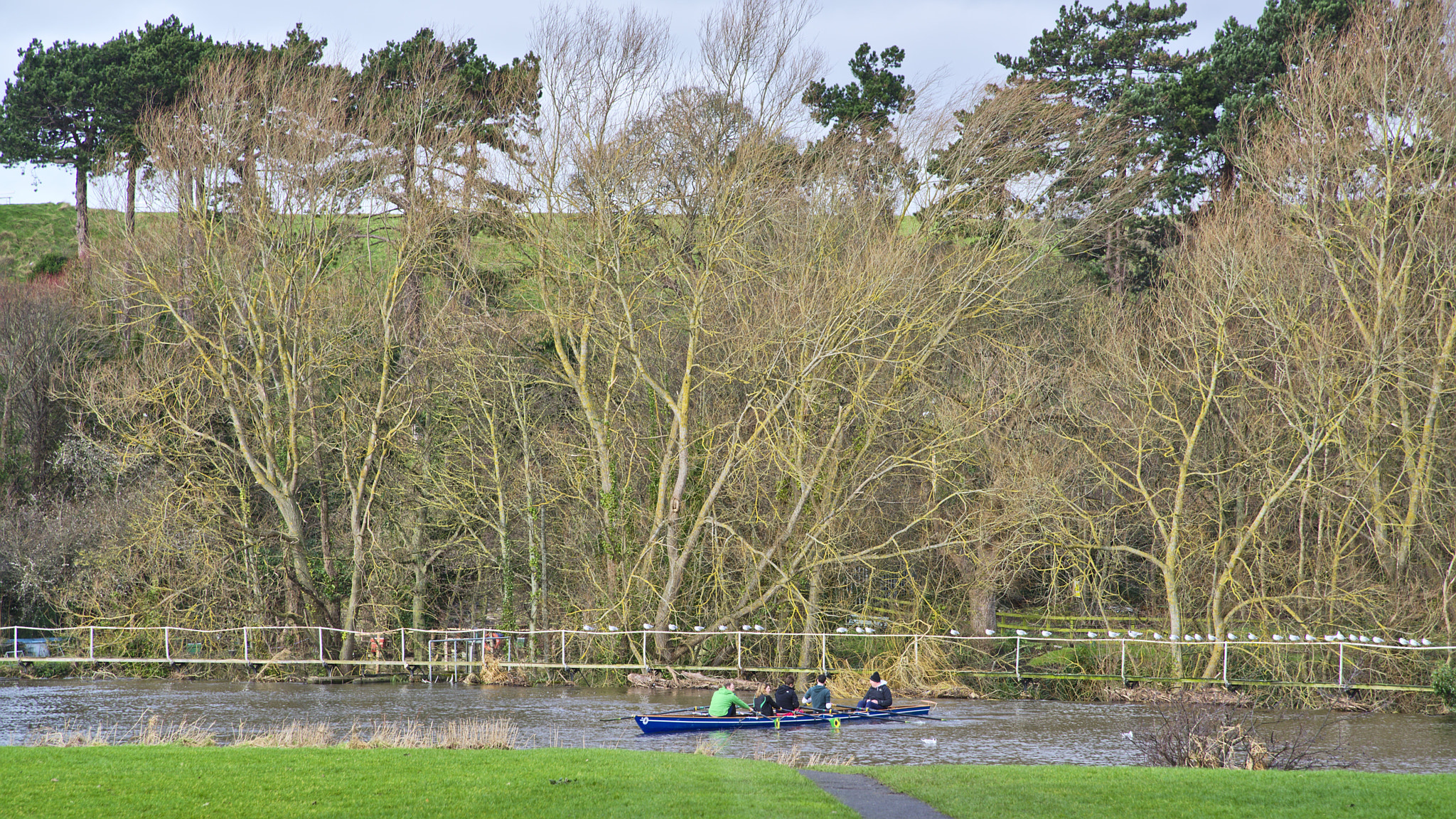
View from the Liffey of the townland of Longmeadows

=== Civil parish of Ward ===
Townlands in the parish of Ward: Cherryhound, Irishtown, Killamonan, Newpark, Spricklestown, Ward Lower and Ward Upper. (Note: Ward civil parish)

Townland	Acres	Image Description	Image
Cherryhound (Note: Cherryhound townland)	112	Roundabout at the M2	
Newpark (Note: Newpark townland)	351	The White House; Pub and Restaurant on the N2 road.	
Ward Lower (Note: Ward Lower townland)	285	Milestone	
Killamonan (Note: Killamonan townland)	76	Horses grazing February 2008	

== See also ==
- List of subdivisions of County Dublin
