= Kinsealy =

Outlying suburb of Dublin, Ireland

Kinsealy Cionn Sáile (Irish)
- Suburb
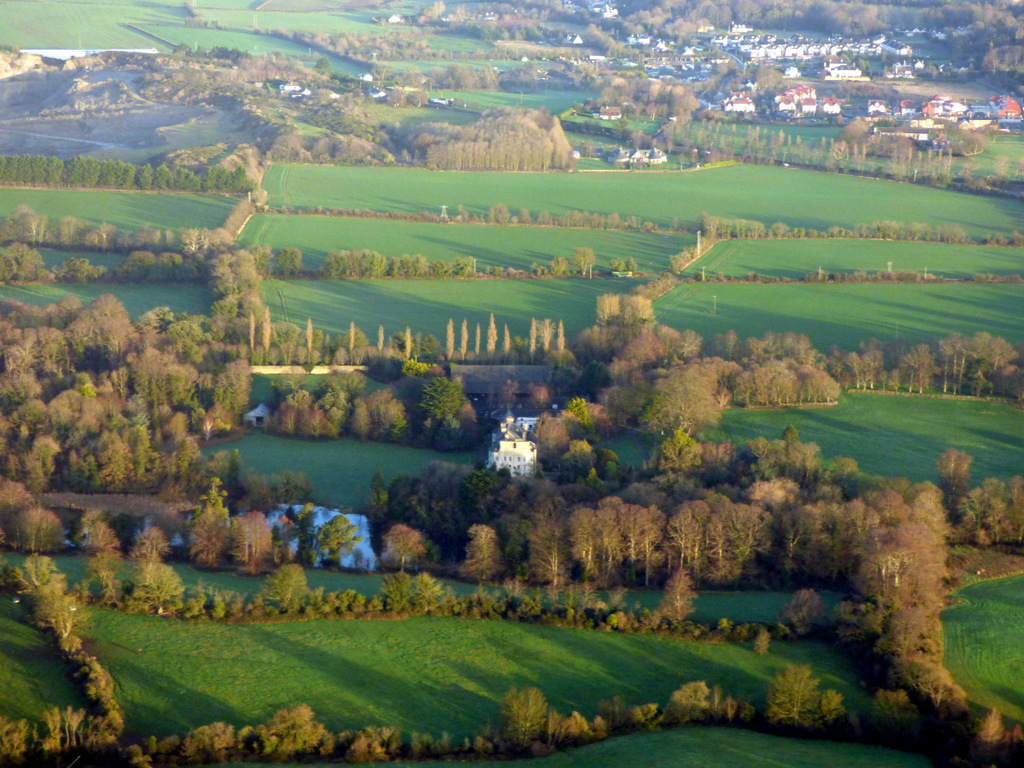
- Farmland at Kinsealy from the air

- Location in Dublin
- Coordinates: 53°25′29″N 6°10′23″W
- Country: Ireland
- Province: Leinster
- County: County Dublin
- Local authority: Fingal County Council
- Elevation: 16 m (52 ft)

Kinsealy (officially Kinsaley; Irish: Cionn Sáile) is an outer suburb of Dublin in Fingal, Ireland. Kinsealy is on the northside of the city, about 13 km from the city centre, on the Malahide Road, in the green belt between the suburbs of Balgriffin, Portmarnock and Malahide.

Kinsaley is also the name of the surrounding electoral division and of a civil parish in the ancient barony of Coolock within the traditional County Dublin. The urban area of Kinsealy crosses into the electoral division of Balgriffin.

Kinsealy gives its name to Kinsealy–Drinan, an urban area outside Swords, treated by the Fingal County Council development plan as part of Swords.

== History ==
Samuel Lewis' 1837 Topographical Dictionary describes the parish of Kinsealy as "well cultivated", with a limestone quarry and a holy well.

== Features ==
One of the most notable structures in the area is Abbeville, a partially 17th century but mainly Georgian house, for many years owned by Charles Haughey, including during his time as Taoiseach. Haughey's lavish lifestyle earned him the nickname, "the Squire of Kinsealy".

Kinsaley House is another of the earliest houses in the area, constructed around 1736 in the fashionable Georgian style. As of 2023, the house is surrounded by a 21st-century housing estate.

== Amenities ==
Kinsealy is served by Dublin Bus routes 42, 42N, and 43. It has a Roman Catholic church named after St. Nicholas of Myra, by a secondary road to Portmarnock. The church site originally held the school and this was relocated to its current site in 1952.

== Demographics ==
Kinsaley (urban area/census town)
Year	Pop.	±%
2011	214	—
2016	294	+37.4%
2022	906	+208.2%
Source: 2011, 2016, 2022

Kinsaley (electoral division)
Year	Pop.	±%
2006	5,526	—
2011	8,475	+53.4%
2016	9,621	+13.5%
2022	11,470	+19.2%
Source: , 2011, 2016, 2022
