= Capite =

Land tenure in old English law

In old English law, a capite (from Latin caput, head) was a tenure in subinfeudation, by which either person or land was held immediately of the king, or of his crown, either by knight-service or socage. A holder of a capite is termed a tenant-in-chief.

Tenures in capite were abolished by the Tenures Abolition Act 1660.
