= Balrothery =

Village in County Dublin, Ireland

Balrothery Baile an Ridire (Irish)
- Village
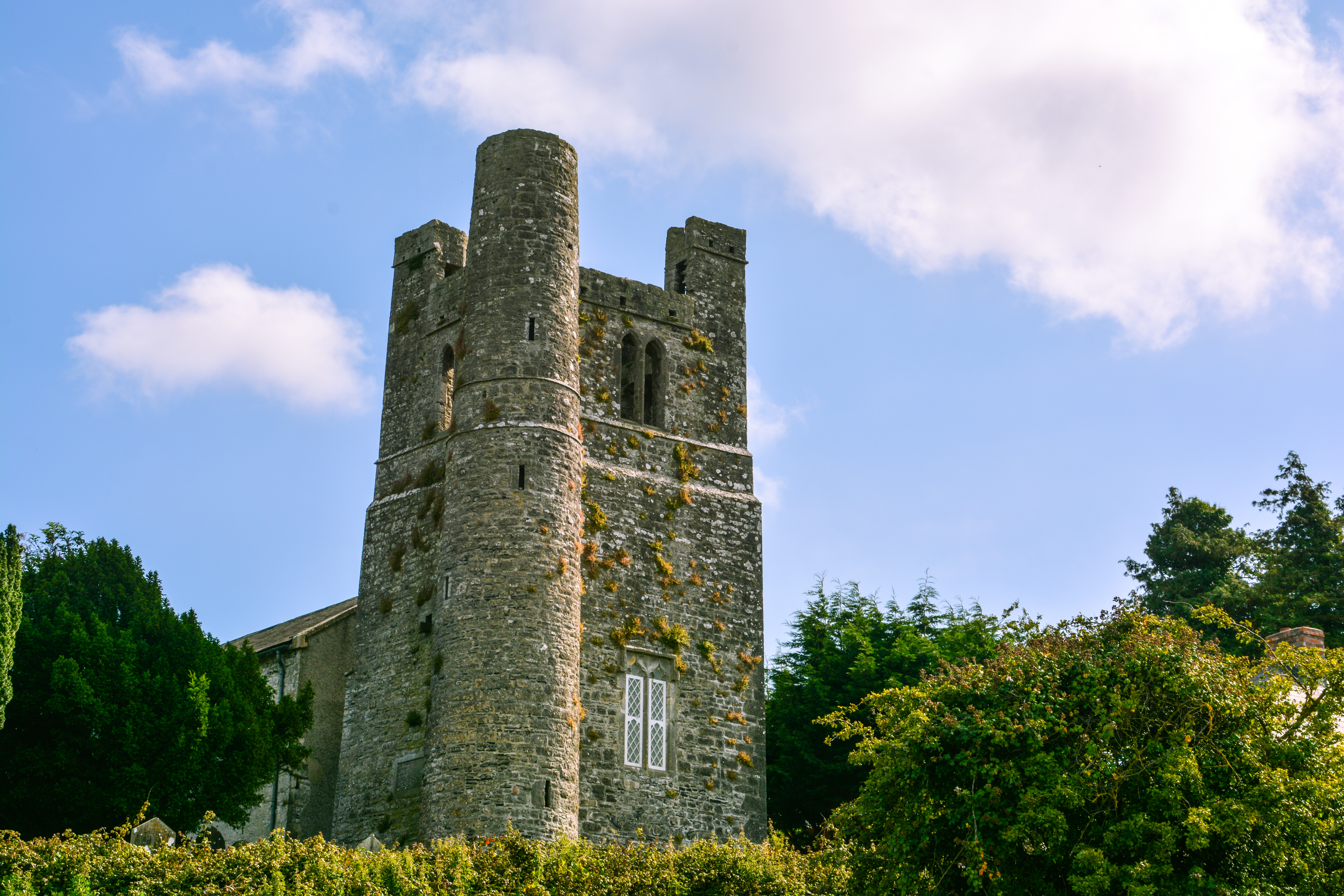
- Balrothery Church Tower

- Location in Ireland
- Coordinates: 53°35′14″N 6°11′19″W
- Country: Ireland
- Province: Leinster
- County: County Dublin
- Local government area: Fingal

Population (2022)
  - Total: 2,282

Balrothery (Irish: Baile an Ridire, meaning 'Town of the Knight') is a village and civil parish located in Fingal, County Dublin, Ireland. The area has historically been called Baile Ruairí in Irish (Town of Ruairí).

The 2022 census population for Balrothery was 2,282.

== Geography ==
The village is located about 2 km south of Balbriggan on the R132, previously the old N1 Dublin-Belfast road.

== History ==
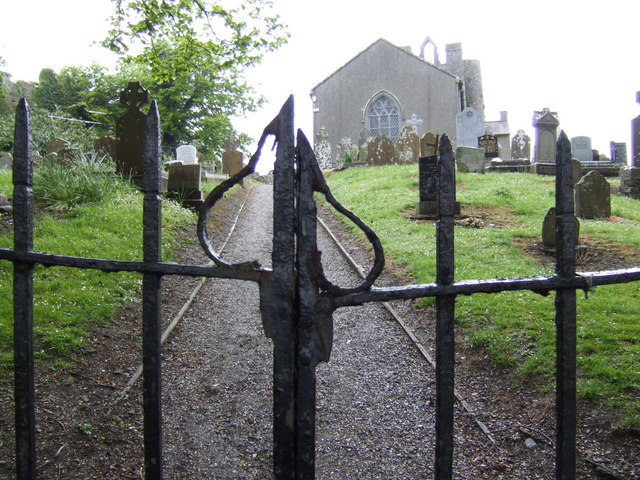
Entrance to St. Peter's church and graveyard - now the heritage centre

Balrothery is also the name of two ancient baronies in the old county of Dublin. Although largely obsolete now, these administrative units have their origins in the Norman conquest of Ireland. A single feudal barony of Balrothery was held in 1343 by Richard Costentyn for one knight's fee. It is one of the seven which constituted the overlordship of Fingal dating back to 1208. It was later split into the baronies of Balrothery East and Balrothery West. Since 1994, the barony has been an integral part of the modern county of Fingal. The village and eponymous civil parish are located in Balrothery East. It is dominated by the tower of the medieval church of St Peter, which stands on the southern edge of the village. The church has now been de-consecrated and functions as the local heritage centre.

== Education ==
Balrothery has one primary level national school, named after the saint Oliver Plunkett. Second-level schools which serve the area include Balbriggan Community College, Loreto College in Balbriggan, Ardgillan Community College, Skerries Community College or Gormanston College in County Meath.

== Sport ==
Balrothery Balbriggan Tennis Club, located in the village's Glebe South Park, is a Tennis Ireland approved club serving Balrothery, Balbriggan and surrounding areas.

North County Cricket Club was founded in 1985 after a merger of Balrothery and Man-O-War cricket clubs. Balbriggan Golf Club borders Balrothery village.

Balrothery Football Club is a local association football (soccer) club, and local GAA clubs include O'Dwyers GAA in near-by Balbriggan and Man-O-War GFC to the south of the village.

== Notable people ==
- Anne Cassin, RTÉ news and television presenter
- Mikey Graham, Actor and member of Irish boyband Boyzone
- Nicholas Hill, Dean of St Patrick's Cathedral, Dublin
- John Mooney & Paul Mooney, Irish International Cricketers
