= Cloghran, Coolock =

Civil parish in the barony of Coolock, County Dublin, Ireland

Coordinates: 53.4273°N 6.2128°W

Cloghran (Irish: Clochrán) is a civil parish in the ancient barony of Coolock in Ireland. It consists of eight townlands: Baskin, (Note: Baskin townland) Cloghran, (Note: Cloghran townland) Clonshagh, Corballis, Middletown, Springhill, (Note: Springhill townland) Stockhole, Toberbunny. (Note: Cloghran civil parish) According to Lewis' 1837 survey,

"Limestone abounds, and near the church is a quarry in which various fossils are found; under this quarry are copper and lead ores, but neither has yet been profitably worked. Baskin Hill, the seat of J. Tymons, Esq., was built by the present Bishop of Dromore, who resided there while rector of St. Doulough's; and Castle Moat, the seat of J. Mac Owen, Esq., takes its name from an extensive moat, or rath, within the demesne, from which is a fine view of the country towards the village of the Man-of-War and the sea, including Lambay Island, Ireland's Eye, Howth, and the Dublin and Wicklow mountains.".

Much of the land in the parish lies between Dublin Airport to the west and the M1 motorway to the east; little, if any, of it, lies within the modern suburb of Coolock.
