= Cloghran, Castleknock =

Civil parish in County Dublin, Ireland

Coordinates: 53.347°N 6.345°W

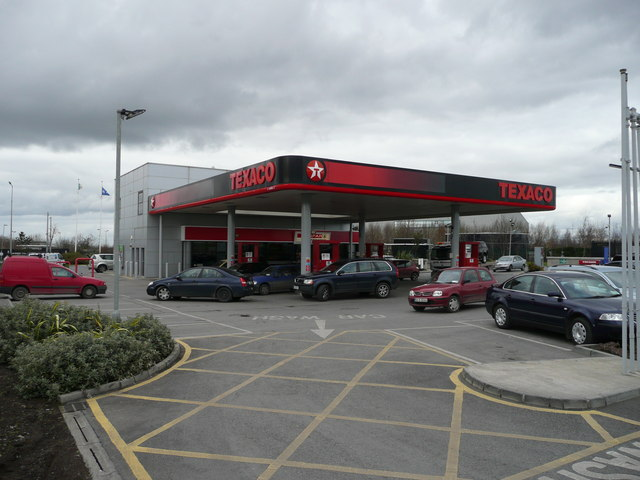
Filling station in Ballycoolen townland

Cloghran (Irish: Clochrán) is a civil parish in County Dublin, Ireland. It is in the historical barony of Castleknock. According to Lewis' 1837 survey,

"This place, which originally belonged to the priory of All Saints, passed, on the dissolution of that house, with its other possessions, to the mayor and corporation of Dublin".

The parish consists of three townlands: Ballycoolen, Cloghran and Grange. (Note: Cloghran civil parish) Most of the land in the parish is taken up with the "Ballycoolen Industrial Estate".
