= Aer Lingus =

Flag carrier airline of Ireland

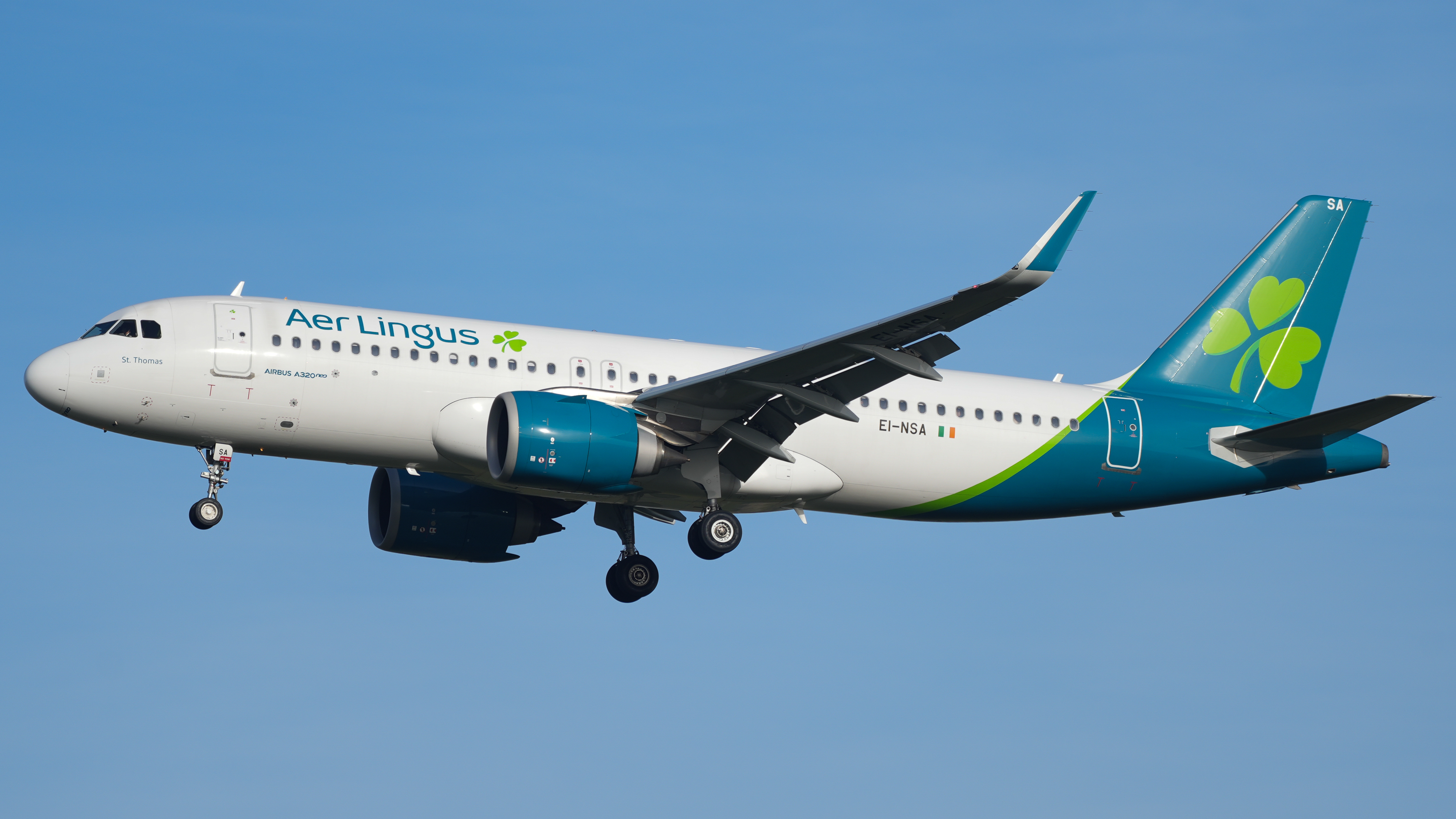
- Aer Lingus Airbus A320neo
IATA	ICAO	Call sign
EI	EIN	SHAMROCK
- Founded: 15 April 1936; 90 years ago
- Commenced operations: 28 May 1936; 90 years ago
- Hubs: Dublin Airport
- Focus cities: Cork Airport
- Frequent-flyer program: AerClub; Avios
- Subsidiaries: Aer Lingus Regional
- Fleet size: 64
- Destinations: 97
- Parent company: International Airlines Group
- Headquarters: Cloghran, County Dublin, Ireland
- Key people: Lynne Embleton (CEO)
- Founder: Government of Ireland
- Revenue: ▼€467 million (2020)
- Operating income: ▲€305 million (2018)
- Net income: ▲€205.5 million (2016)
- Employees: 4,500 approx (2020)
- Website: www.aerlingus.com

Aer Lingus (/ˌɛər ˈlɪŋɡəs/ air LING-gəs; an anglicisation of the Irish aerloingeas pronounced [ˌeːɾˠˈl̪ˠɪɲɟəsˠ], meaning "air fleet") (Note: According to the spelling and grammar rules of Modern Irish, the compound noun aerloingeas and the two-word term loingeas aeir (with aer in the genitive case qualifying loingeas) are the only two possible renderings into Irish of 'Aer Lingus'. The two-word term aer loingeas (with both nouns in the nominative case) is not possible according to these rules.) is the flag carrier of Ireland. It was founded by the Irish Government in 1936. Between 2006 and 2015 it was privatised, and it is now a wholly owned subsidiary of International Airlines Group (IAG). The airline's head office is on the grounds of Dublin Airport in Cloghran, County Dublin.

Aer Lingus was a member of the Oneworld airline alliance, which it left on 31 March 2007. After the takeover by IAG, it was expected that Aer Lingus would re-enter Oneworld. However, at a press briefing on 15 November 2017, the airline's then CEO Stephen Kavanagh stated that the airline has "no plans to join Oneworld". The airline has codeshares with Oneworld, Star Alliance and SkyTeam members, as well as interline agreements with Etihad Airways, JetBlue Airways and United Airlines. Aer Lingus has a hybrid business model of low-cost and traditional carriers, operating a mixed fare service on its European routes and full service, two-class flights on transatlantic routes.

Ryanair owned over 29% of Aer Lingus stock, and the Irish state owned over 25% before being bought out by IAG in 2015. The state had previously held an 85% shareholding until the government decided to float the company on the Dublin and London stock exchanges on 2 October 2006. The principal group companies include Aer Lingus Limited, Aer Lingus Beachey Limited, Aer Lingus (Ireland) Limited and Dirnan Insurance Company Limited, all of which are wholly owned.

On 26 May 2015, after months of negotiations on a possible IAG takeover, the Irish government agreed to sell its 25% stake in the company. Ryanair retained a 30% stake in Aer Lingus, which it agreed to sell to IAG on 10 July 2015 for €2.55 per share. In August 2015, Aer Lingus' shareholders officially accepted IAG's takeover offer. IAG subsequently assumed control of Aer Lingus on 2 September 2015.

== History ==
=== Early years ===
Aer Lingus was founded on 15 April 1936, with a capital of £100,000. Its first chairman was Seán Ó hUadhaigh. Pending legislation for Government investment through a parent company, Aer Lingus was associated with Blackpool and West Coast Air Services which advanced the money for the first aircraft, and operated with Aer Lingus under the common title "Irish Sea Airways". Aer Lingus Teoranta was registered as an airline on 22 May 1936. The name Aer Lingus was proposed by Richard F O'Connor, who was County Cork Surveyor, as well as an aviation enthusiast.

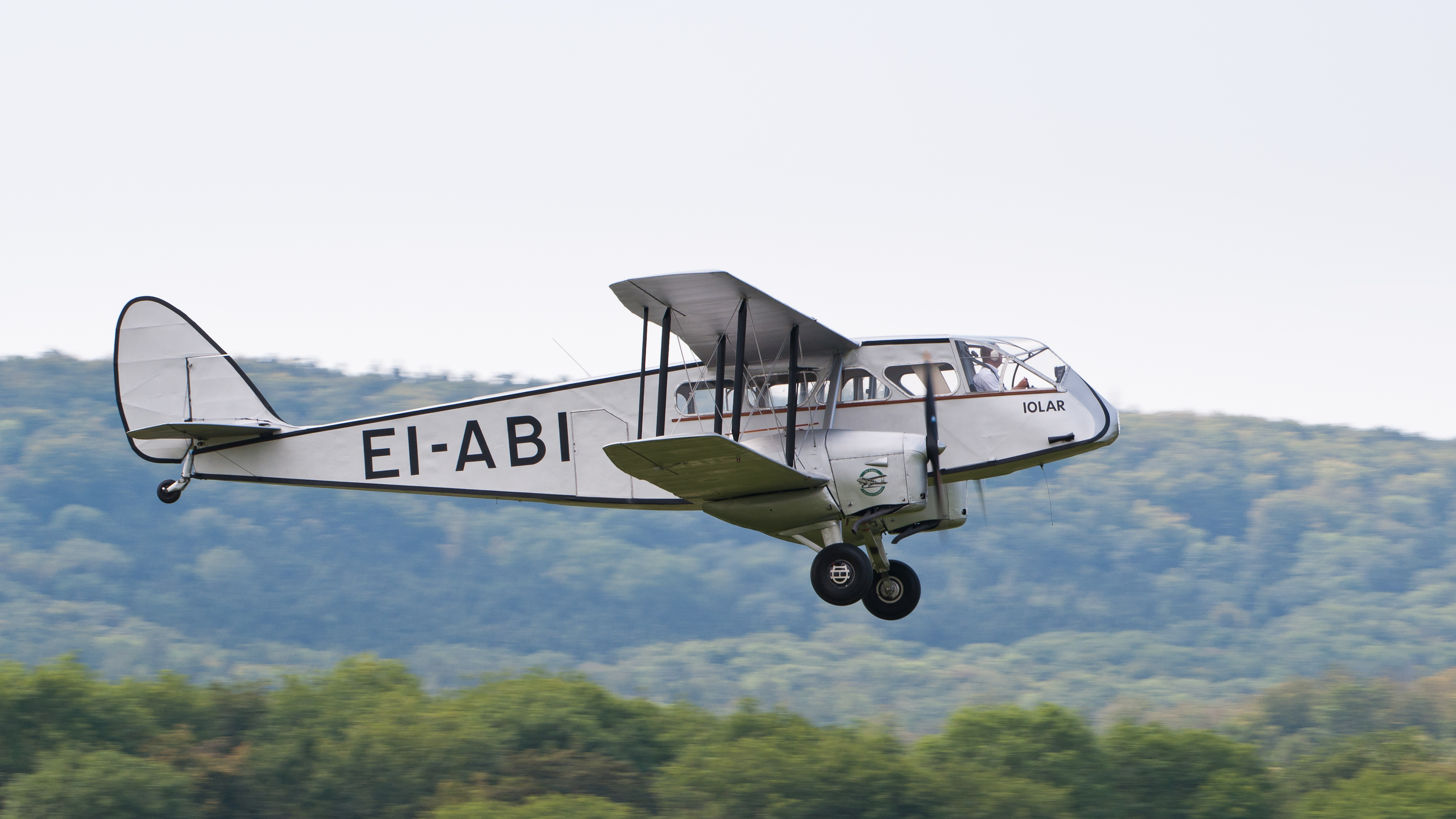
DH-84 Dragon, repainted in the livery of Aer Lingus' original aircraft, Iolar

On 27 May 1936, five days after being registered as an airline, its first service began between Baldonnel Airfield in Clondalkin, Dublin and Bristol (Whitchurch) Airport, the United Kingdom, using a six-seater de Havilland DH.84 Dragon biplane (registration EI-ABI), named Iolar (Eagle). Later that year, the airline acquired its second aircraft, a four-engined biplane de Havilland DH.86 Express named Éire, with a capacity of 14 passengers. This aircraft provided the first air link between Dublin and London by extending the Bristol service to Croydon. At the same time, the DH.84 Dragon was used to inaugurate an Aer Lingus service on the Dublin-Liverpool route.

The airline was established as the national carrier under the Air Navigation and Transport Act (1936). In 1937, the Irish government created Aer Rianta (now called Dublin Airport Authority), a company to assume financial responsibility for the new airline and the entire country's civil aviation infrastructure. In April 1937, Aer Lingus became wholly owned by the Irish government via Aer Rianta.

The airline's first General Manager was Dr J. F. (Jeremiah known as 'Jerry') Dempsey, a chartered accountant, who joined the company on secondment from Kennedy Crowley & Co (predecessor to KPMG Ireland) as Company Secretary in 1936 (aged 30) and was appointed to the role of General Manager in 1937. He retired 30 years later in 1967 at the age of 60.

In 1938, a de Havilland DH.89 Dragon Rapide replaced Iolar, and the company purchased a second DH.86B. Two Lockheed 14s arrived in 1939, Aer Lingus' first all-metal aircraft.

In January 1940, a new airport opened in the Dublin suburb of Collinstown and Aer Lingus moved its operations there. It purchased a new DC-3 and inaugurated new services to Liverpool and an internal service to Shannon. The airline's services were curtailed during World War II, with the sole route being to Liverpool or Barton Aerodrome Manchester, depending on the fluctuating security situation.

=== Post-war expansion ===
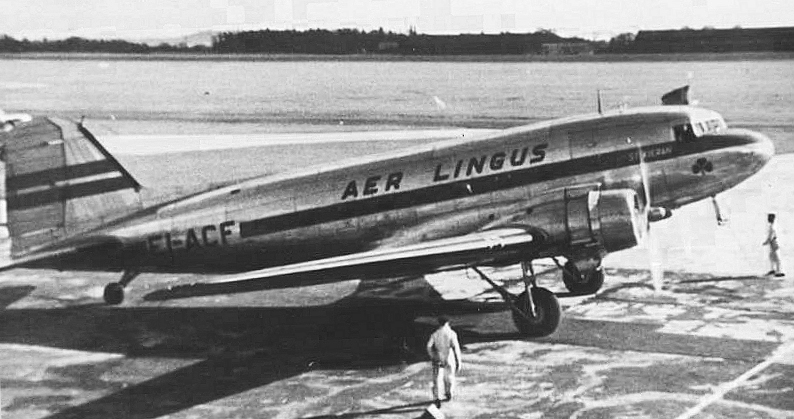
Aer Lingus Douglas DC-3 at Manchester Airport in 1948 wearing the first postwar livery

On 9 November 1945, regular services were resumed with an inaugural flight to London. From this point, Aer Lingus aircraft, initially mostly Douglas DC-3s, appeared in a bare metal (silver) and green livery. The airline introduced its first flight attendants.

In 1946, a new Anglo-Irish agreement gave Aer Lingus exclusive UK traffic rights from Ireland in exchange for a 40% holding by British Overseas Airways Corporation (BOAC) and British European Airways (BEA). Because of Aer Lingus' growth, the airline bought seven new Vickers Viking aircraft in 1947; however, these proved to be uneconomical and were soon sold.

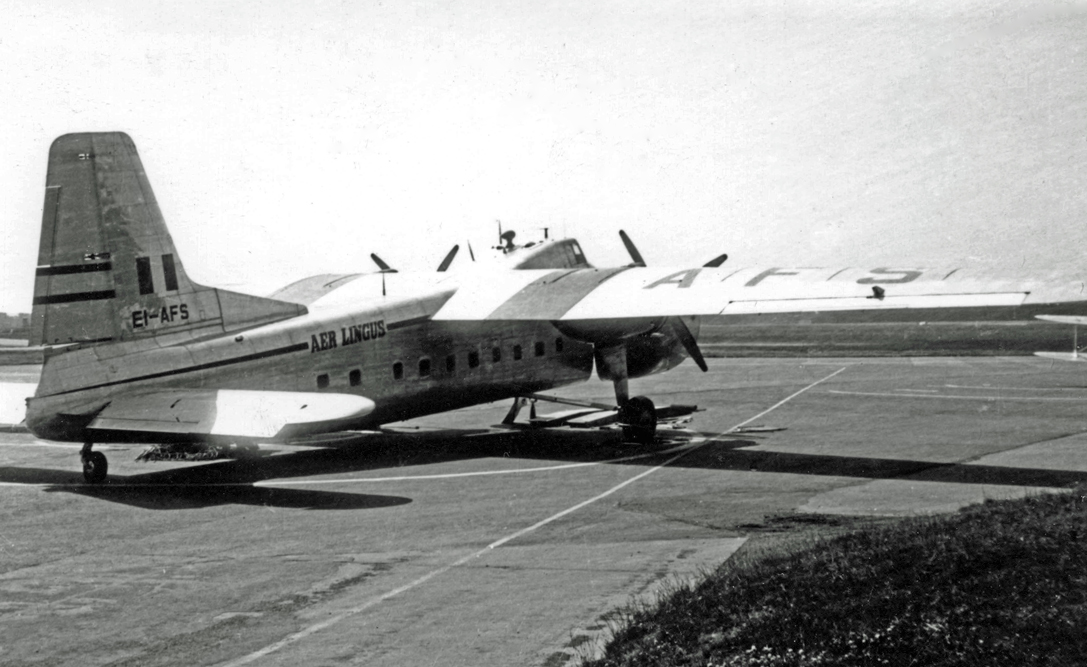
Bristol 170 Freighter at Manchester Airport in 1953

In 1947, Aerlínte Éireann came into existence to operate transatlantic flights to New York City from Ireland. The airline ordered five new Lockheed L-749 Constellations, but a change of government and a financial crisis prevented the service from starting. John A Costello, the incoming Fine Gael Taoiseach (Prime Minister), was not a keen supporter of air travel and thought that flying the Atlantic was too grandiose a scheme for a small airline from a small country like Ireland.

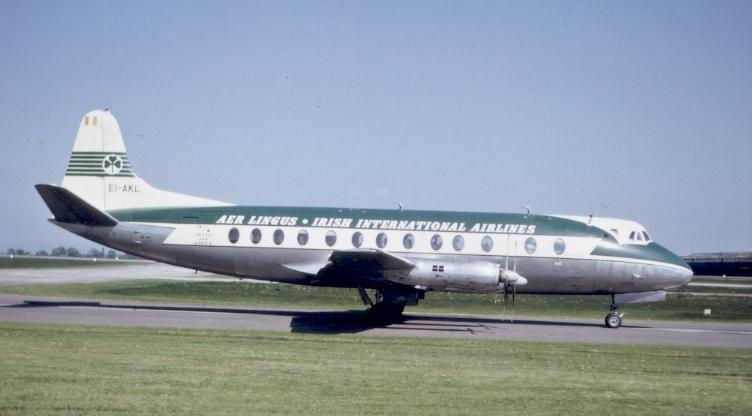
Vickers Viscount 808 in "green top" livery at Manchester Airport in 1963

During the late 1940s and early 1950s, Aer Lingus introduced routes to Brussels, Amsterdam via Manchester and to Rome. Because of the expanding route structure, the airline became one of the early purchasers of Vickers Viscount 700s in 1951, which were placed in service in April 1954. In 1952, the airline expanded its all-freight services and acquired a small fleet of Bristol 170 Freighters, which remained in service until 1957.

Prof. Patrick Lynch was appointed the chairman of Aer Lingus and Aer Rianta in 1954 and served in the position until 1975. In 1956, Aer Lingus introduced a new, green-top livery with a white lightning flash down the windows and the Irish flag displayed on the fin.

=== First transatlantic service ===
On 28 April 1958, Aerlínte Éireann operated its first transatlantic service from Shannon to New York. In 1960, Aerlínte Éireann was renamed Aer Lingus.

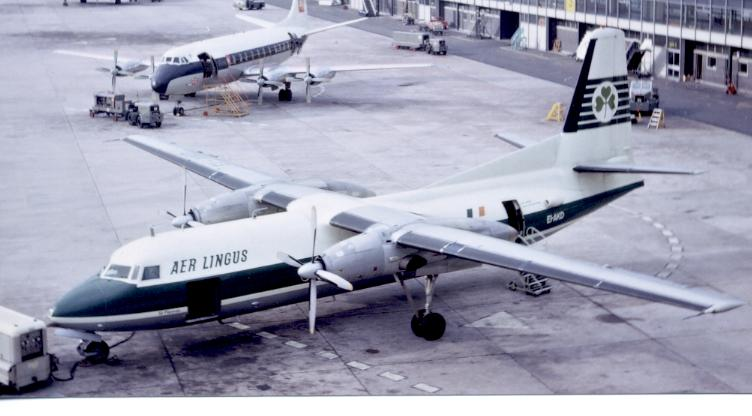
Fokker F27 at Manchester Airport in 1965. The F27 was used on short-haul services between 1958 and 1966.

Aer Lingus bought seven Fokker F27s, which were delivered between November 1958 and May 1959. These were used in short-haul services to the UK, gradually replacing the Dakotas, until Aer Lingus replaced them in 1966 with secondhand Viscount 800s.

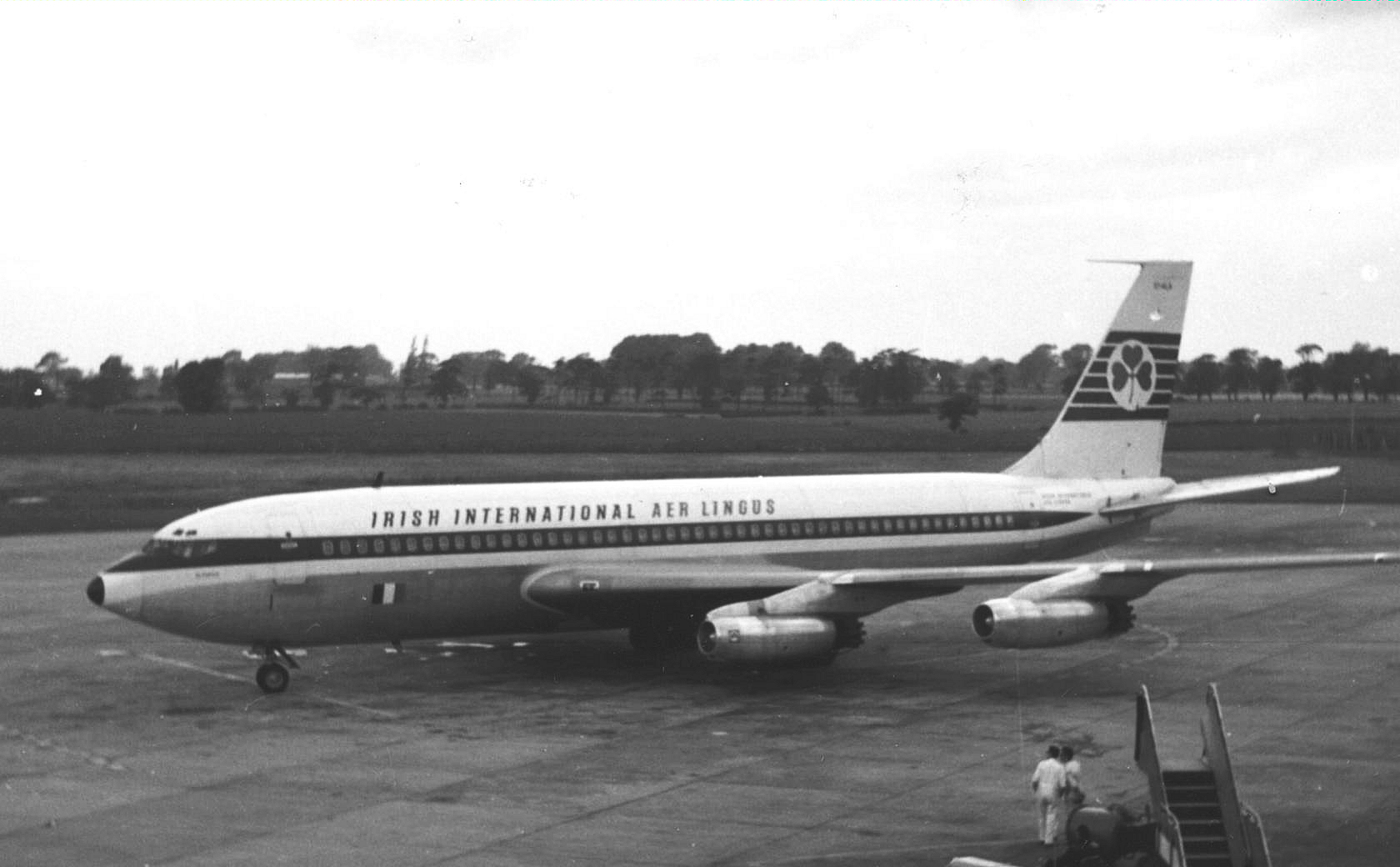
Boeing 720 in Aer Lingus-Irish International livery in 1965

The airline entered the jet age on 14 December 1960 when it received three Boeing 720 for use on the New York route and the newest Aer Lingus destination Boston.

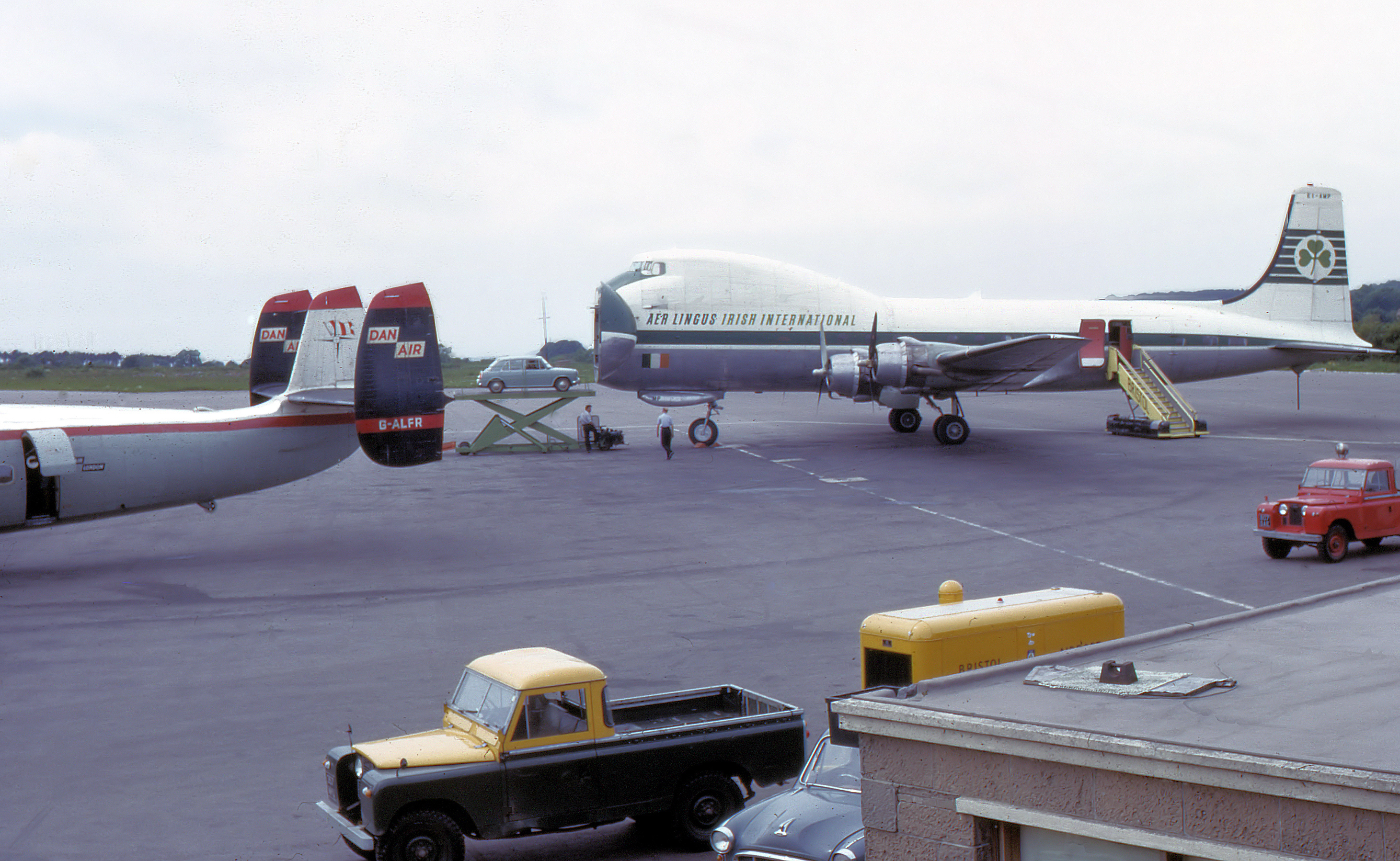
Aviation Traders Carvair that was used as a vehicle freighter is seen loading an Austin 1100 at Bristol Airport in 1964

In 1963, Aer Lingus added Aviation Traders Carvairs to the fleet. These aircraft could transport five cars, which were loaded into the fuselage through the nose of the aircraft. The Carvair proved to be uneconomical for the airline, partly due to the rise of auto ferry services, and the aircraft were used for freight services until disposed of.

The Boeing 720s proved to be a success for the airline on the transatlantic routes. To supplement these, Aer Lingus took delivery of its first larger Boeing 707 in 1964, and the type continued to serve the airline until 1986.

=== Jet aircraft ===
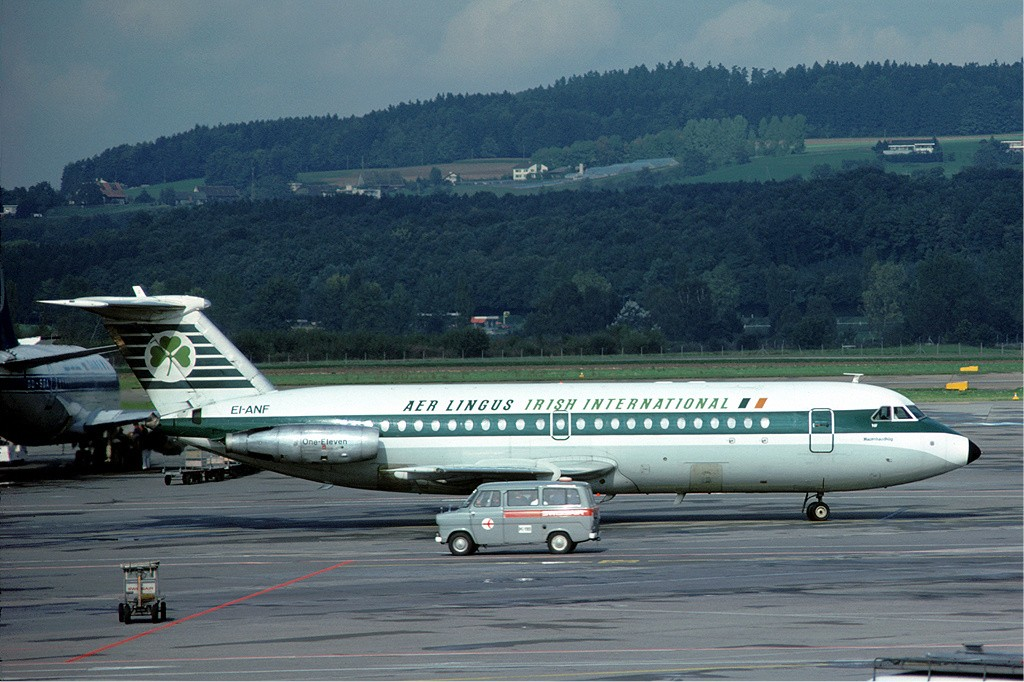
BAC One-Eleven in the old livery at Zurich Airport, Switzerland in 1975

Conversion of the European fleet to jet equipment began in 1965 when the BAC One-Eleven started services on continental Europe. The airline adopted a new livery in the same year, with a large green shamrock on the fin. In 1966, the remainder of the company's shares held by Aer Rianta were transferred to the Minister for Finance.

In 1966, the company added routes to Montreal and Chicago. In 1968, flights from Belfast, in Northern Ireland, to New York City started, however, it was soon suspended due to the beginning of the Troubles.

Aer Lingus introduced Boeing 737s to its fleet in 1969 to cope with the high demand for flights between Dublin and London. Later, Aer Lingus extended the 737 flights to all of its European networks.

In 1967, after 30 years of service, General Manager Dr J. F. Dempsey signed the contract for the airline's first two Boeing 747 aircraft before he retired later that year.

=== 1970s to 1990s ===
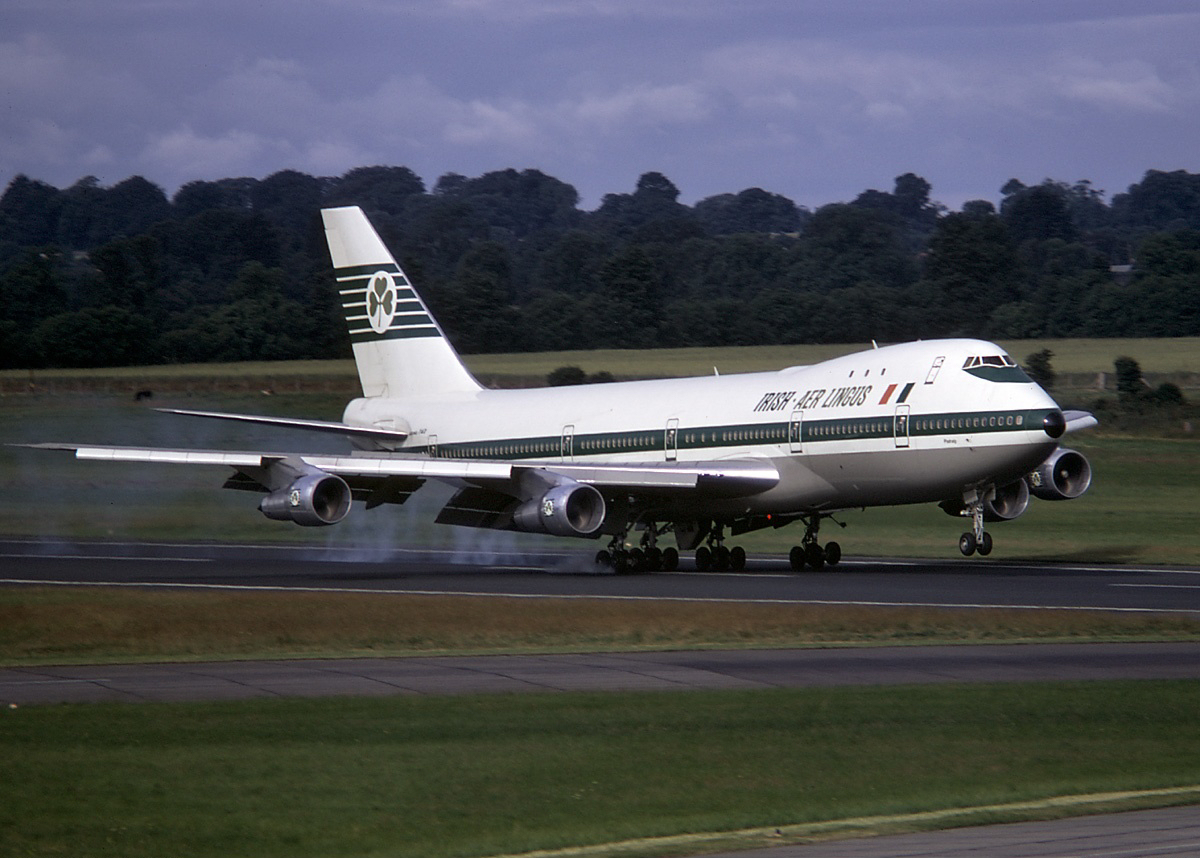
Boeing 747 EI-ASJ in its original 1971 livery. This aircraft flew for Aer Lingus until 1997.

On 6 March 1971, Aer Lingus took delivery of the first of two Boeing 747s for use on transatlantic routes. The company later purchased a third for its fleet but quickly offered it for lease because it was not initially profitable for the company to fly 747s across the Atlantic. In 1974, Aer Lingus unveiled a new livery which eliminated the word International and/or Irish from the fuselage titles. The livery included a dark green cheatline, light green upper surfaces and tail, split by a thinner blue line, plus a large white shamrock on the tail fin.

In 1973 Aer Lingus opened the London Tara Hotel.

In 1976, Aer Lingus purchased Dunfey Hotels from Aetna.

In 1977, Aer Lingus recruited its first female pilot, Gráinne Cronin – the airline was the second in Europe (after Scandinavian Airlines) to introduce female pilots.

In September 1979, Aer Lingus became the first European airline other than Alitalia to be used by Pope John Paul II, when he flew aboard a specially modified Boeing 747 (EI-ASI or St. Patrick) from Rome to Dublin and later from Shannon to Boston. In the early 1980s, the 707s were phased out.

In 1983 Aer Lingus subsidiary Dunfey Hotels acquired Omni International Hotels.

In 1984, the airline formed a fully owned subsidiary, Aer Lingus Commuter Ltd., so that Aer Lingus could fly to larger cities in Ireland and Britain whose flying time from Dublin did not require jet aircraft. These services employed five of the Belfast-built Short 360 after conducting a trial with the Short 330. This subsidiary inherited the name of a previous division, constituted in March 1983, activated on the following 1 May and equipped with Short 330. Around this time, Aer Lingus purchased a majority shareholding in the cargo airline Aer Turas, owner of some DC-8 freighter jets.

In 1988, Aer Lingus sold Omni Hotels to World International Holdings, Ltd., and the Hong Kong–based conglomerate The Wharf (Holdings) Limited for $135 million.

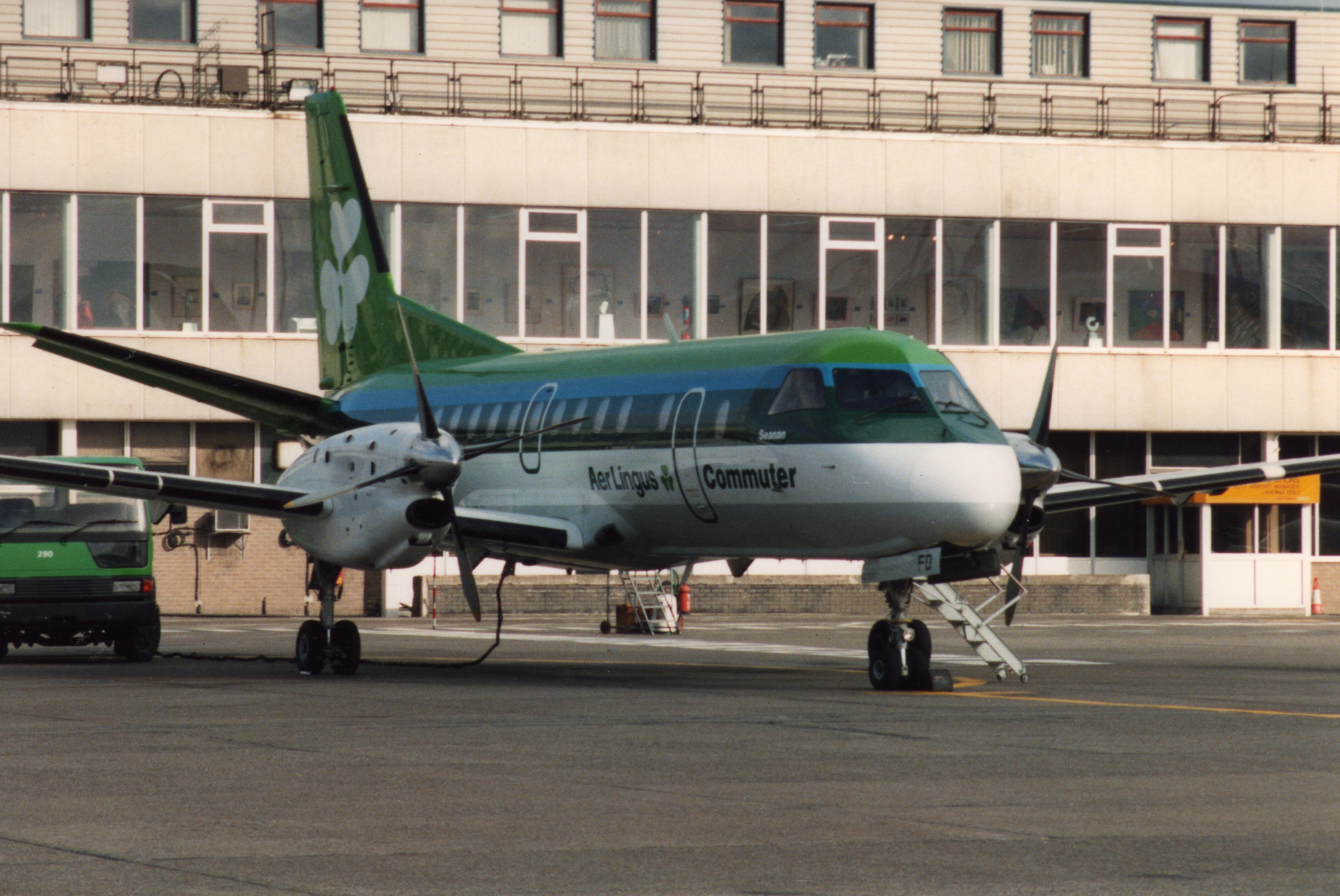
Aer Lingus Commuter Saab 340 at Dublin Airport in 1993

Between 1987 and 1989, new Boeing 737s arrived to replace the older ones, and six Fokker 50s were added to the Commuter fleet. In 1990, after the passage of the deregulation act for the airline industry in Ireland, Aer Lingus reconsidered its operational policies. It retired the BAC One-Elevens and replaced them with five new 737s. In 1991, four Saab 340Bs arrived at the commuter division to replace the Short 360 aircraft. By 1992, Aer Lingus's entire original 737-200 fleet had been replaced, and it was now the first carrier in the world operating all three versions of the second-generation 737. These were the −300, −400 and −500 series, although the −300 did not stay long in Aer Lingus service.

In 1994, Aer Lingus started direct services between Dublin and the United States using the Airbus A330 and in May of that year, Aer Lingus operated the first A330-300 ETOPS service over the North Atlantic. This led to the phasing out of the Boeing 747 and the briefly operated Boeing 767-300ER. On 2 October 1995, the Boeing 747 service ceased operations after twenty-five years of service. By that time, over eight million people had travelled across the Atlantic in Aer Lingus 747s. The late 1990s saw Aer Lingus return to Belfast with service to New York via Shannon. It also added Newark Liberty International Airport as a destination, but discontinued these flights in 2001.

In 1995 Aer Lingus sold Copthorne Hotels, a chain of 18 hotels in the UK, France and Germany and originally founded by British Caledonian, to cut operating losses. Aer Lingus had owned the chain since 1987.

The first Airbus short-haul aircraft arrived in 1998 in the form of the Airbus A321, initially to mainly operate the Dublin-Heathrow route. Six were delivered in 1998 and 1999. The first Airbus A320 was delivered in 2000, with three more added to the fleet by 2001.

=== 2000s to 2010s ===
On 1 February 2001, Aer Lingus Commuter merged back into the mainline operation. The business was severely affected by the 9/11 attacks in the United States. In response, the airline cut staff numbers and destinations and reduced its fleet. As a result, it weathered the storm and returned to profit, largely through lowering the airline's cost base, updating the fleet with modern Airbus equipment and developing new routes to mainland European destinations. Aer Lingus had previously largely neglected mainland Europe in favour of US and British destinations. It positioned itself as competition to the European no-frills airlines while offering intercontinental flights, phased-out Business class travel for short-haul flights, but retained cargo services on a small number of routes.

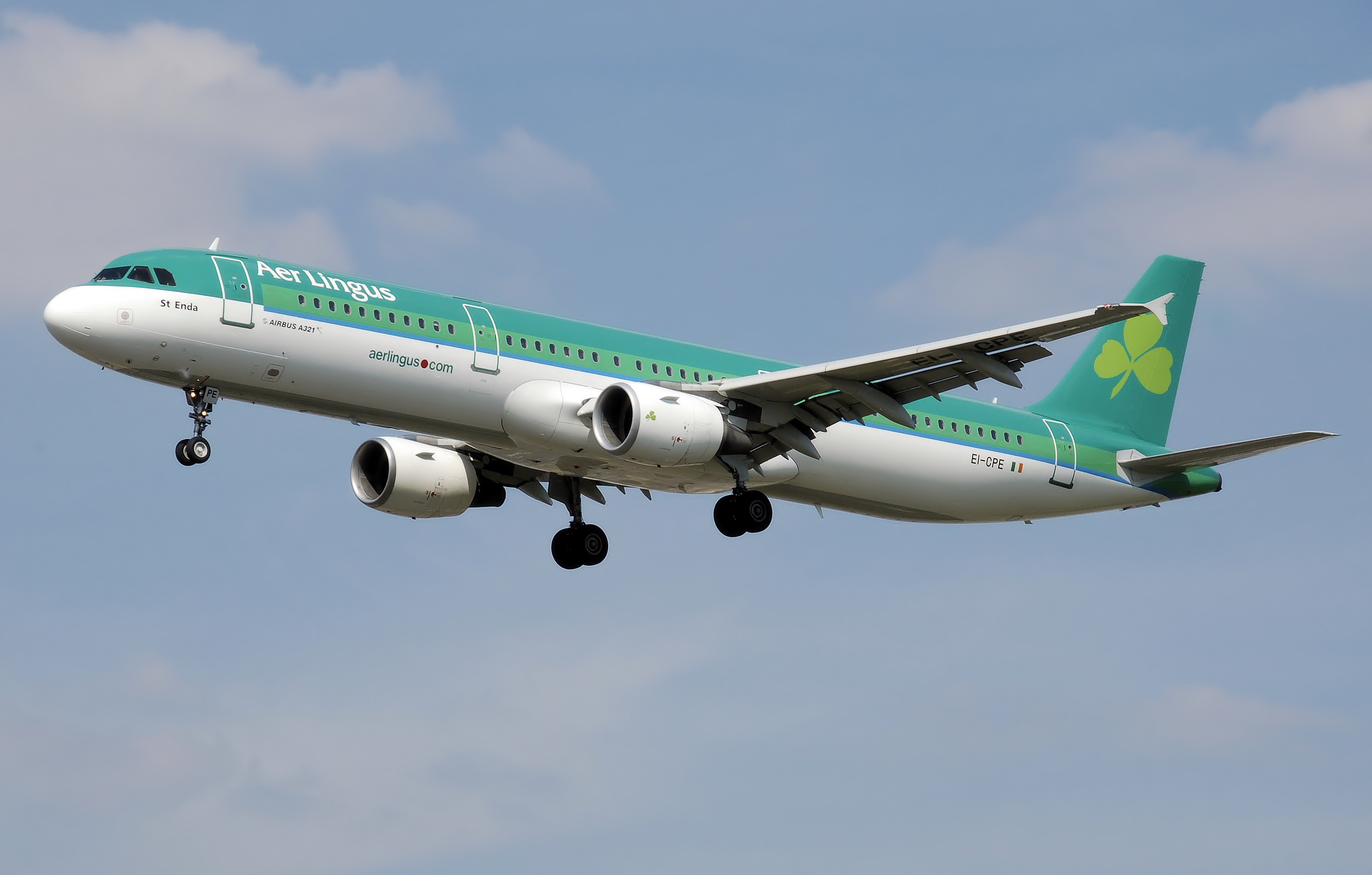
Airbus A321-200, 2007

A large order for A320 aircraft saw deliveries commencing in 2004 and continuing to 2011. The delivery of these aircraft allowed the withdrawal of the Boeing 737. On 29 October 2005, Aer Lingus withdrew its last two 737 aircraft from service, marking the end of Boeing aircraft at Aer Lingus, and the beginning of an all-Airbus fleet.

On 27 October 2005, Aer Lingus announced its first scheduled service to Asia from March 2006 as Dubai International Airport in the United Arab Emirates, where Chief Executive Dermot Mannion was based when at Emirates. Despite the Aer Lingus press release describing it as the first long-haul service outside the United States, there had in fact been a previous service to Montreal from 1966 to 1979. The great circle distance of 5,926 kilometres (3,682 mi) is comparable to the service to Chicago. At the same time, Mannion linked the funding of new long-haul aircraft to replace the A330 fleet with the privatisation of the airline. The Dubai service ceased in March 2008 as the airline sought to increase its market share in the newly liberalised transatlantic market.

On 6 June 2007, Aer Lingus strengthened its relationship with the European manufacturer by ordering six of the new A350-900 and six A330-300. These were used to expand long-haul operations as well as replace three older models. Deliveries of the A330 began in February 2009. In 2011, Aer Lingus switched their remaining three A330 orders to A350-900s, with delivery no sooner than 2017. The A350 orders were subsequently assumed by IAG in 2015.

==== Flotation ====
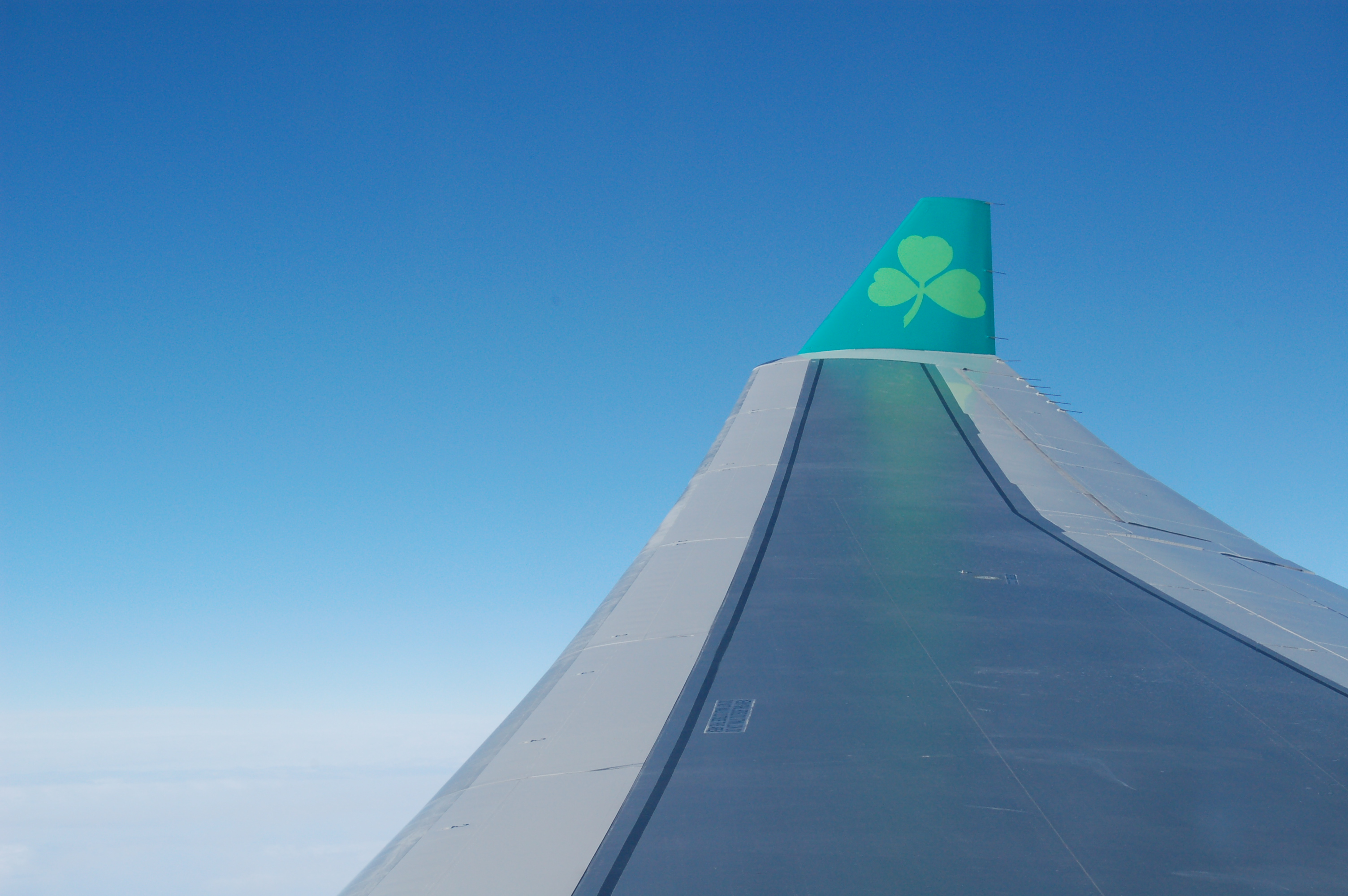
Aer Lingus logo painted on an Airbus A330 winglet

In preparation for the commercial flotation of Aer Lingus on the Dublin stock market, the Irish government agreed to abolish the Shannon Stopover from the end of 2006 in stages.

The company began conditional (or "grey-market") share dealings on 27 September 2006 and was admitted to the Official Lists of the Irish Stock Exchange and London Stock Exchange on 2 October 2006. At the time of the flotation, the Irish government maintained a 28% shareholding, while employees held 15%. The stock IPO offer price was €2.20.

Aer Lingus withdrew from the Oneworld airline alliance on 31 March 2007, instead, entering into bilateral agreements with airlines including British Airways, Virgin Atlantic, Delta Air Lines, KLM, and United Airlines. Aer Lingus explained the move stating the carrier was repositioning as a low-cost carrier, which did not fit with Oneworld's pitch to the premium international frequent flyer.

On 6 February 2007, however, the airline announced its intention to form a new alliance with JetBlue. This new alliance was to act as a weblink between the two airlines, enabling Aer Lingus customers to book JetBlue destinations from the Aer Lingus website. In 2008, it also announced an alliance with United Airlines for connecting services within the US.

With the flotation of Aer Lingus on the stock exchange, Aer Lingus had planned to expand its route network, but this was put on hold due to the economic situation.

==== First Ryanair takeover bid (2006) ====
On 5 October 2006, Ryanair launched a bid to buy Aer Lingus. Ryanair CEO Michael O'Leary said the move was a "unique opportunity" to form an Irish airline. The "new" airline would carry over 50 million passengers a year. Ryanair said it had bought a 16% stake in Aer Lingus and was offering €2.80 for the remaining shares, a premium over the €2.20 the shares were trading for. The firm was trading at €1.13bn but Ryanair's offer valued it at €1.48bn. On the same day Aer Lingus rejected Ryanair's takeover bid. On 5 October 2006, Ryanair confirmed it had raised its stake to 19.2%, and said it had no problem in the Irish Government keeping its 28.3%. The Irish Times reported that the Government would possibly seek judgement from the courts, and referral to competition authorities in Dublin – although this would be automatic under European regulation, as the combined group would control 78% of the Dublin – London passenger air traffic.

On 29 November 2006, Ryanair confirmed it had increased its stake to 26.2%.

On 21 December 2006, Ryanair announced it was withdrawing its bid for Aer Lingus, intending to pursue another bid soon after the European Commission finished investigating the bid. The EC had been concerned that the takeover would reduce consumer choice and increase fares.

On 27 June 2007, the European Commission announced its decision to block the bid on competition grounds saying the two airlines controlled more than 80% of all European flights to and from Dublin Airport.

==== Cross border expansion ====
On 7 August 2007, the airline announced that it would establish its first base outside the Republic of Ireland at Belfast International Airport in Northern Ireland. Services from Belfast International commenced in December 2007. As of July 2008, the airline had three Airbus A320 aircraft based at the airport, serving eleven European destinations. Significantly, this move restored the Belfast International to London Heathrow link and Aer Lingus cooperated with its codeshare partner British Airways on this route to connect with BA's network at Heathrow. To do so, the airline discontinued its Shannon-Heathrow service, a move that generated political controversy in the west of Ireland, particularly as the Shannon-London route was still profitable. The airline predicted that this move would add one million additional passengers annually. The Shannon to Heathrow service has since been reinstated.

After five years at Belfast International Airport, Aer Lingus announced on 19 July 2012 that it would be moving its operations to George Best Belfast City Airport. The airline transferred its Belfast – London Heathrow flights to there, and also announced the operation of a thrice-daily London Gatwick service (no longer operated), and on 31 March 2013, launched services to Faro and Málaga. Aer Lingus based two aircraft in Belfast City Airport for the Winter 2012–2013 season and a third aircraft arrived for the Summer 2013 season.

==== Open Skies ====
On 22 March 2007, as a result of the EU–US Open Skies Agreement, Aer Lingus announced three new long-haul services to the United States. From Autumn 2007, Aer Lingus commenced direct flights to Orlando, San Francisco and Washington, D.C.-Dulles, facilitated by the arrival of two new Airbus A330 aircraft in May 2007. The airline also serves Boston (Logan International Airport), Chicago (O'Hare International Airport) and New York (JFK Airport). Aer Lingus ended its Middle-Eastern Route to Dubai in March 2008 and ended its Los Angeles route in November 2008. The Washington D.C. and the San Francisco routes were discontinued as of 24 October 2009. Services from Washington, D.C., resumed on 28 March 2010 when the airline began flights from Washington, D.C., to Madrid, Spain in a joint venture with United Airlines. The airline terminated this route on 30 October 2012. Service to San Francisco resumed on 2 April 2014. Dublin–Washington Dulles service began in May 2015. The Dublin–Los Angeles route was reintroduced on 4 May 2016. Other US destinations include Hartford, introduced on 28 September 2016; Seattle, introduced on 18 May 2018; Minneapolis-St Paul, introduced on 1 July 2019.

==== Effect of 2008 recession ====
After reporting losses of €22 million for the first half of the year, in October 2008, Aer Lingus announced a €74 million cost-saving plan. This plan included cutting up to 1,500 jobs, scaled back ground operations at Cork Airport, and outsourced all ground staff at Dublin Airport. This met with a largely negative response particularly from trade unions.

In December 2008, Aer Lingus announced that the Shannon – Heathrow service would resume from 29 March 2009 following new arrangements with the trade unions on staff costs and the Shannon Airport Authority on airport charges. However at the end of June 2009, the company had accumulated losses of €93 million and Chairman Colm Barrington confirmed this situation could not continue. In October 2009, newly appointed Chief Executive Christoph Mueller announced a radical cost-cutting plan that would lead to the loss of 676 jobs at the company and see pay and pension reductions for those being retained. The total plan aimed to achieve savings of €97 million between then and 2011. As a six-week consultation process began, Mueller refused to rule out further cuts in the future.

==== Second Ryanair takeover bid (2008/2009) ====
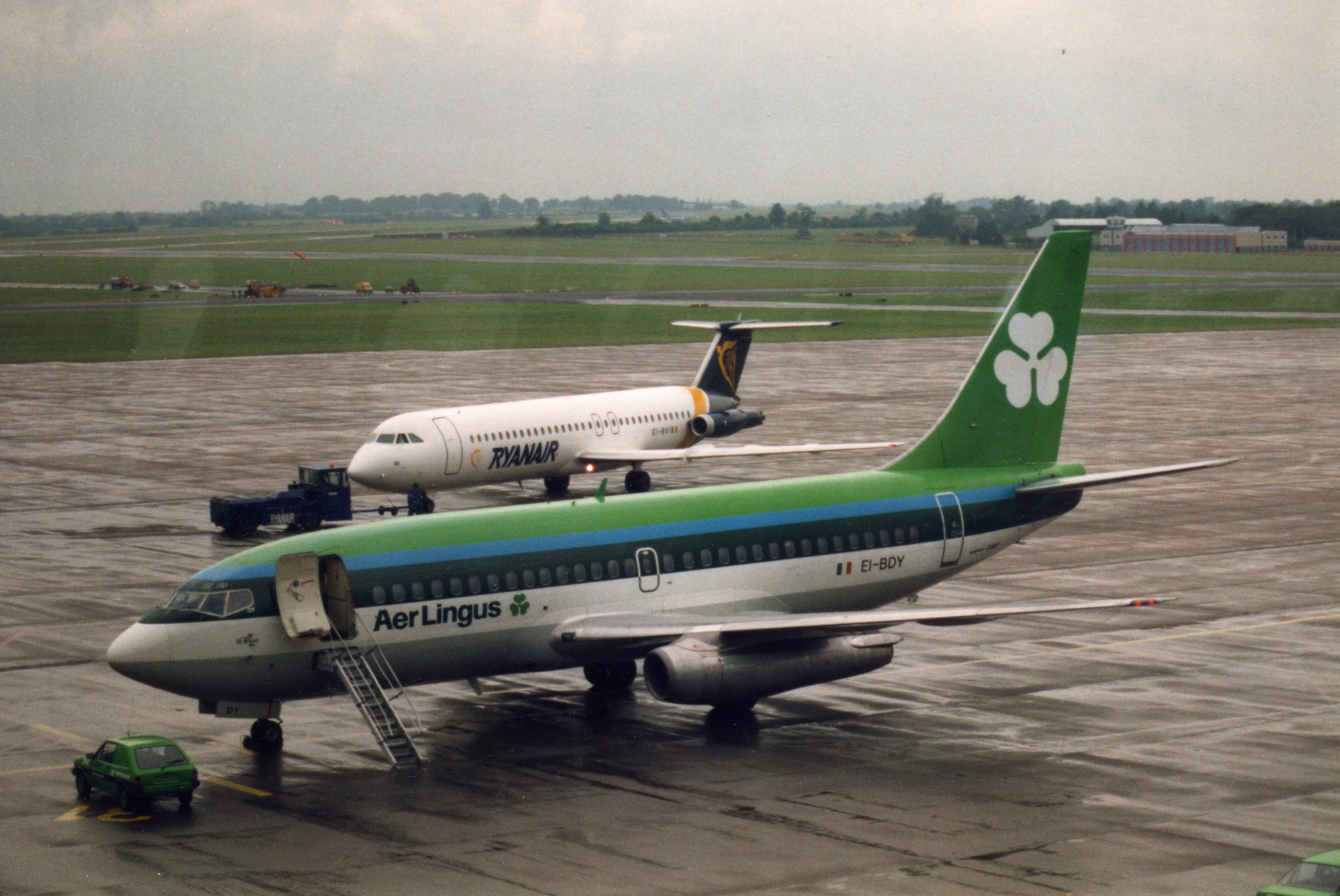
Aer Lingus Boeing 737-200 and a BAC One-Eleven of rival airline Ryanair at Dublin Airport in 1992

On 1 December 2008, Ryanair launched a second takeover bid of Aer Lingus, making an all-cash offer of €748 million (£619M; US$950M). The €1.40 offer was a 28% premium on the average closing price of Aer Lingus stock during the 30 days to the 28 November (€1.09), but half what Ryanair had offered in 2006. Ryanair said, "Aer Lingus, as a small, stand-alone, regional airline has been marginalised and bypassed as most other EU flag carriers consolidate." The two airlines would operate separately and Ryanair claimed that it would double the Aer Lingus short-haul fleet from 33 to 66 and create 1,000 new jobs. The Aer Lingus Board rejected the offer and advised its shareholders to take no action. The offer was eventually rejected by a majority of the other shareholders. It was the second failed attempt by Michael O'Leary to take over the national flag carrier. Ryanair initially left the offer open to Aer Lingus until it withdrew the bid on 28 January 2009. The Irish Government slammed O'Leary's offer as "undervaluing the airline" and stated that a Ryanair takeover would have a "significant negative impact" on competition in the industry and on the Irish consumer. Ryanair repeatedly stated that another bid was unlikely, but it kept a stake in Aer Lingus, prompting an investigation by competition regulators in the UK.

In June 2009, Aer Lingus re-branded its Premier Class to the new Business Class.

==== Gatwick base ====
On 19 December 2008, Aer Lingus announced that it would open a base at Gatwick Airport. Four aircraft were based there beginning April 2009, serving eight destinations that included Dublin, Faro, Knock, Málaga, Munich, Nice, Vienna and Zürich. CEO Dermot Mannion also said the company expects to increase the number of aircraft based at Gatwick to eight within 12 months.

As of 6 June 2009, the airline based an additional A320 aircraft at Gatwick, bringing the total number to five and making Gatwick its biggest base outside Ireland. This resulted in six new routes to Bucharest, Eindhoven, Lanzarote, Tenerife, Vilnius and Warsaw which commenced in late October 2009. The Gatwick to Nice route was suspended for the winter months.

On 8 January 2010, due to the weak demand in air travel, Aer Lingus announced that it was to reduce the number of aircraft based at Gatwick from five to three. The three remaining aircraft were to operate the carrier's services to Dublin, Knock and Málaga, as well as a new route to Cork.

In January 2011, Aer Lingus announced a new daily service from Gatwick to Shannon starting at the end of March. The service has since been suspended. The service to Málaga was suspended in January 2012 and the base closed in 2015. The Gatwick to Cork route ended 27 October 2012. A new service from Gatwick to Belfast City Airport started on 28 October, operating three times per day, and follows the airline's move from Belfast-International Airport to Belfast City Airport. That service was suspended on 27 April 2016.

==== Appointment of Christoph Mueller as CEO ====
On 6 April 2009, CEO Dermot Mannion announced his resignation from the airline after four years as Chief Executive. He was replaced by German-born Christoph Müller (alternative spelling "Mueller"), former head of TUI Travel and Sabena, who joined Aer Lingus on 1 October 2009.

On 2 December 2009, Aer Lingus announced that talks with its unions had broken down. As a result, the board voted to reduce capacity, and with it associated jobs, as a response. According to Mueller, concessions offered by unions were of a short-term nature, and the airline was asked for high compensation in return. Aer Lingus did not identify the routes or jobs to be cut, but they would most likely "commence immediately and will be compulsory," according to Mueller. As of April 2010, all employees' groups had passed votes on the acceptance of the 'Greenfield' cost-cutting plans which were expected to save €57M annually. Once implemented, the second phase of cost-cutting was to commence which aimed to save €40M annually by reducing 'back office staff' numbers by up to 40% according to the CEO.

Mueller indicated that Aer Lingus intended to reposition itself again, moving away from head-to-head competition with Ryanair in the low-cost sector to a more hybrid model with a stronger emphasis on service. As part of this move, Aer Lingus entered talks to join an airline alliance again, having left Oneworld in 2007.

Aer Lingus announced on 15 June 2010 that it would suspend services from Shannon to Boston and New York (JFK) for 11 weeks beginning January 2011.

==== 75th anniversary ====
Aer Lingus celebrated its 75th anniversary in 2011. On 26 March, the company presented its latest aircraft which has been painted in the 1960s livery and the crew was wearing a selection of historical uniforms.

==== Third Ryanair takeover bid (2012) ====
On 19 June 2012, Ryanair announced its intention to launch another bid to take over Aer Lingus, at €1.30 per share, for a total of €694 million. Ryanair expressed the hope that the competition authorities would not block this attempt, pointing to the recent takeovers of bmi and Brussels Airlines by International Airlines Group (IAG) (parent company of Iberia and British Airways) and Lufthansa, respectively.
On 20 June 2012, Aer Lingus issued a press release stating that having reviewed Ryanair's proposed offer, the company board rejected it and advised the company's shareholders not to take any action concerning it. The statement pointed out that any offer from Ryanair was unlikely to be capable of completion due to, firstly, the EU Commission's 2007 decision to block the airline's bid for Aer Lingus at the time, and, secondly, the UK Competition Commission's ongoing investigation of Ryanair's minority stake in Aer Lingus. Furthermore, the press release stated that the Aer Lingus board believed that Ryanair's offer undervalued Aer Lingus, considering the airline's profitability and balance sheet, including cash reserves over €1 billion (as of 31 March 2012).

On 27 February 2013, the European Commission blocked the third attempt by Ryanair to take over Aer Lingus, stating that the merger would have damaged consumers' choice and resulted in increased fares.

==== Virgin Atlantic wet-lease agreement ====
In December 2012, following the acquisition of British Midland International by British Airways, Virgin Atlantic was awarded slots to fly domestic routes in the UK from Heathrow Airport, ending the monopoly on these services that BA had held since its successful takeover. Aer Lingus supplied on a wet lease agreement four Airbus A320-214 aircraft (painted in Virgin's colours but under Irish registration) as well as crew for these services, which operated from London Heathrow to Aberdeen, Edinburgh and Manchester. Services began on 31 March 2013 to Manchester. This wet-lease agreement ended in September 2015, as Virgin Atlantic cancelled its domestic services.

==== Long-haul expansion ====
In July 2013, expansion into North America was announced launching in 2014; including a direct service from Dublin to San Francisco five times weekly and a daily service from Dublin to Toronto to be operated by Air Contractors with Boeing 757s on behalf of the airline. It was also announced that transatlantic services from Shannon to Boston and New York would operate daily all year round from January 2014 to Boston and from March 2014 to New York's John F. Kennedy International Airport; however, the airline would lease Boeing 757 aircraft from Air Contractors to operate these routes, rather than using its Airbus A330 aircraft as it had done before. In addition, Aer Lingus service to Washington Dulles airport resumed 1 May 2015, with four flights weekly, and flights to Los Angeles, Newark, Miami, Philadelphia, and Seattle all started between 2015 and 2018. Flights from Dublin to Minneapolis operated from 2019 until being suspended due to the COVID-19 pandemic; they were scheduled to resume 29 April 2024.

On 24 March 2021, Aer Lingus announced the launch of four new routes from Manchester Airport; New York John F Kennedy and Orlando from 29 July 2021, Barbados from 20 October 2021 and Boston from summer 2022.

==== Change of CEO ====
On 18 July 2014, Aer Lingus said it had "been agreed" between the company and Mueller that he would step down as CEO and director in May 2015. Mueller left to join Malaysia Airlines as part of its restructuring exercise. On 16 February 2015, the company announced that the new CEO and director would be Stephen Kavanagh, beginning 1 March 2015. As of 1 January 2019, Sean Doyle became the new Aer Lingus CEO. As of 6 April 2021, Lynne Embleton became the new Aer Lingus CEO.

==== IAG takeover (2014/2015) ====
On 14 December 2014, International Airlines Group (IAG), owner of British Airways, Iberia and Vueling, launched a €1 billion takeover bid (€2.30 per share) for Aer Lingus Group plc. The Aer Lingus Board rejected the offer on 16 December 2014, with Aer Lingus commenting that the offer was, "preliminary, highly conditional and non-binding". It was further noted: "The board has reviewed the proposal and believes that it fundamentally undervalues Aer Lingus and its attractive prospects. Accordingly, the proposal was rejected".

On 9 January 2015, Aer Lingus rejected a second bid from IAG, proposing a €2.40 per-share takeover. On 24 January 2015, IAG launched a third bid for Aer Lingus, proposing a €2.55 per-share takeover offer, totalling close to €1.4 billion. On 27 January 2015, Aer Lingus's board announced that "the financial terms of IAG's third proposal for the airline are at a level it is willing to recommend", Aer Lingus said it noted, "IAG's intentions regarding the future of the company, in particular, that Aer Lingus would operate as a separate business with its own brand, management and operations".

On 26 May 2015, the Irish Government agreed to the sale of its 25% shareholding to IAG, with a takeover now dependent on Ryanair's position on the matter. On 10 July 2015, Ryanair voted to sell its nearly 30% stake in the airline. The takeover was later approved by the EU and US regulators subject to IAG giving up five slot pairs at London Gatwick. On 2 September 2015, IAG assumed control of Aer Lingus. On 17 September 2015, following completion of the acquisition by IAG, the company's shares were delisted from the Irish Stock Exchange and the London Stock Exchange.

=== 2020s ===
On 25 February 2020, Aer Lingus noted it had been advised by the Department of Foreign Affairs that travel restrictions were being placed on several Italian towns within Italy's Lombardy region as a result of an outbreak of COVID-19 there, however, it stated all flights would continue to operate, further advising all flights operated would continue to comply with guidelines locally from the HSE as well as from the WHO and EASA.

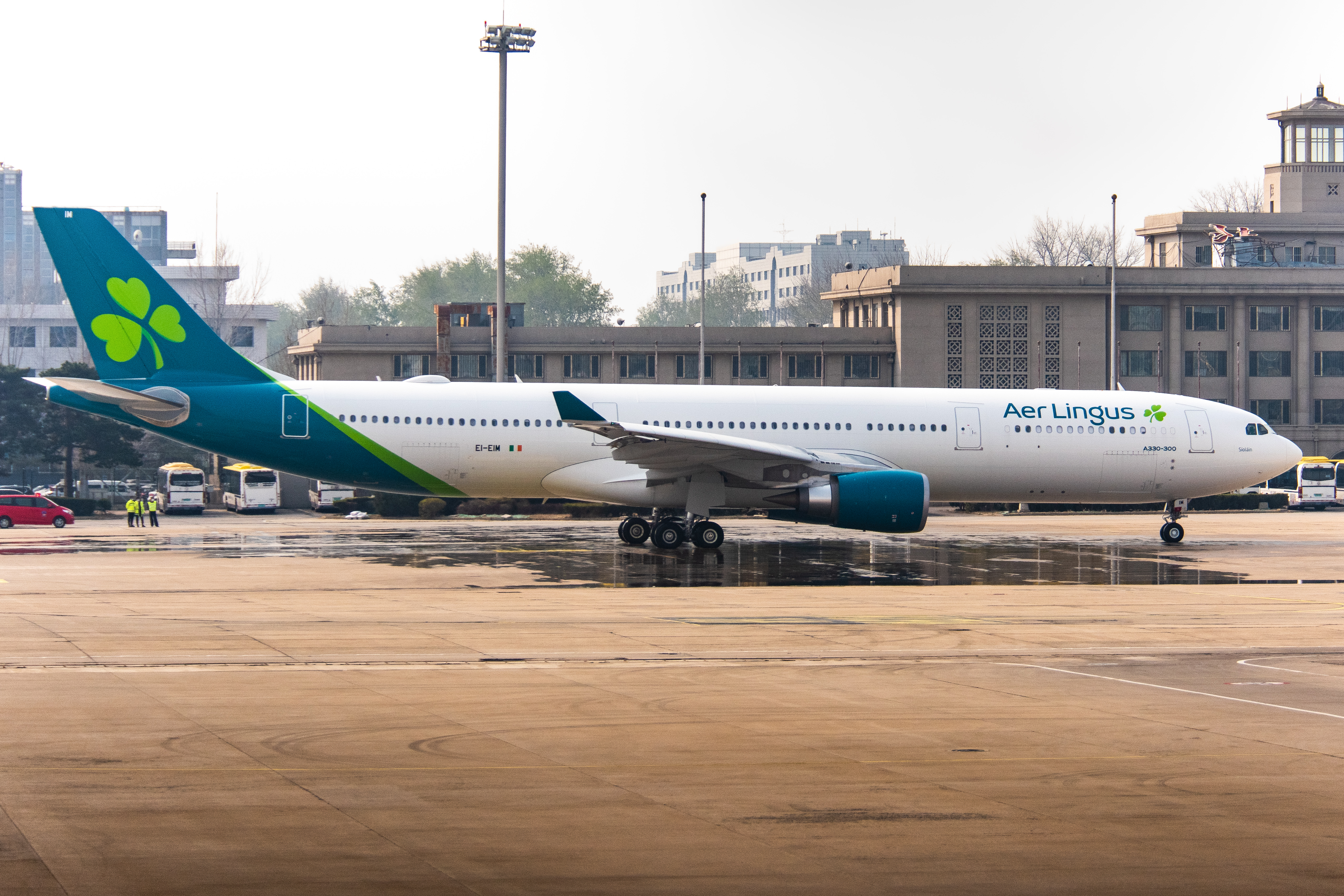
Aer Lingus Airbus A330-300 in Beijing, China in 2020 retrieving PPE for Ireland's HSE

On 28 February, Aer Lingus had been informed that a passenger had travelled with COVID-19 on a service from Milan-Linate to Dublin and that it was cooperating fully with the HSE and Department for Foreign Affairs. Four Aer Lingus cabin crew were also placed into self-isolation from the flight in question. The following day, Aer Lingus announced flight suspensions to Northern Italy, subsequently extending this on 10 March to all services to Italy.

On 13 March, Donald Trump, then President of the United States, announced a European travel ban which initially exempted Ireland, however this was extended to cover Ireland the following day. Aer Lingus subsequently announced network-wide reductions which eventually saw its network of flights reduced by 95%, the airline's plan for its biggest summer schedule within its history was scuppered as a result of what became a global pandemic. In a temporary measure, the airline confirmed it was cutting hours and salaries for all employees by 50%.

Later that month on 29 March, Aer Lingus flight EI9019 from Beijing, China touched down at Dublin Airport carrying vital PPE for Ireland's health service workers, it marked the start of hundreds of flights the carrier was expected to operate to/from China on request of the Government.

With just 5% of scheduled flights operating, it was announced on 1 May 2020 that Aer Lingus was seeking 900 job cuts. The airline subsequently entered into talks with trade unions about changes to work practices and proposed job cuts, Aer Lingus CEO Sean Doyle commented that it would take years for the aviation industry to recover. Aer Lingus later confirmed it was seeking further temporary pay cuts and changes to work practices in a cost saving exercise, advising that its 2021 schedule would be at least 20% lower than planned. Job cuts were confirmed later that month, those holding temporary contracts were made redundant and cabin crew based in Shannon were informed that they would be temporarily laid off as the airline was not operating services from there.

On 13 June, media reporting indicated broad acceptance of proposed measures based on a final draft document between Aer Lingus and Trade Unions, however, the following day, the union Fórsa representing over 1,400 Aer Lingus cabin crew advised of its intention to ballot members. The airline stated on 15 June that if acceptance was not agreed by 6pm that evening, it would withdraw its offer and implement them unilaterally with a 70% cut to employees' wages excluding pilots. As the deadline passed the airline initiated the action to implement the changes angering Trade Unions representing the majority of Aer Lingus employees. On 17 June, the airline agreed to allow a ballot for up to two weeks for its pilots for changes to work practices and recovery of salaries.

In June 2021, the airline said it wanted to freeze workers' pay for five years while it is proposing sharp cuts in rates paid to new cabin and crew staff.

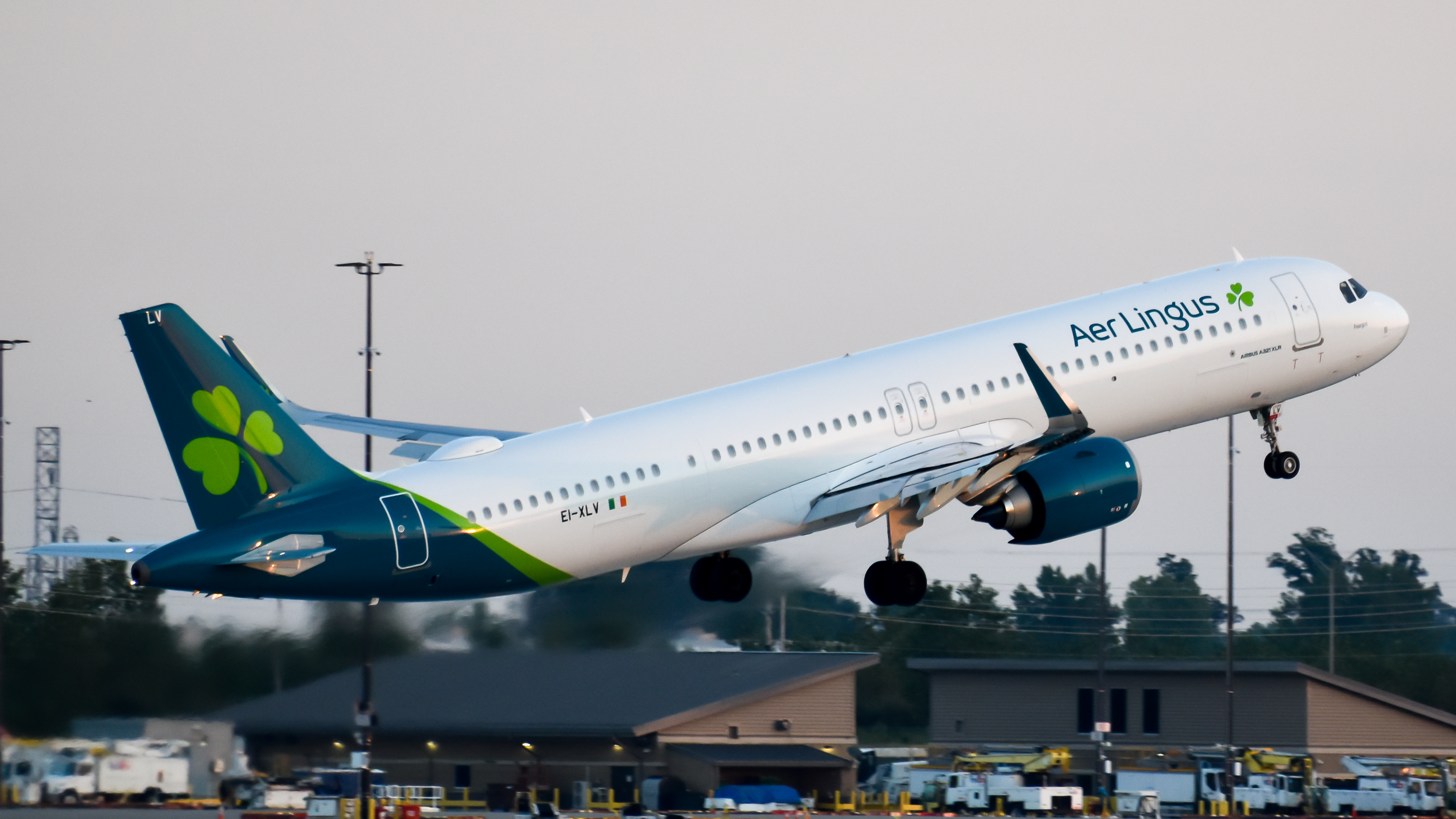
An Aer Lingus Airbus A321XLR departing Indianapolis

In 2024, IAG announced that Aer Lingus would no longer be the worldwide launch operator of the Airbus A321XLR as originally planned. Due to ongoing labour disputes, the first aircraft would be reallocated to sister company Iberia instead.

On 23 October 2024, it was reported that Aer Lingus will be introducing a new non-stop direct route between Dublin and Indianapolis, beginning 3 May 2025. Aer Lingus planned to schedule four flights per week using Airbus A321XLR aircraft.

In January 2025, a lawsuit that was filed in 1997 by the Airports Authority of India over landing and parking charges on an aircraft leased to East-West Airlines was dismissed. The court found AAI's claims to be vexatious, and levied INR10 million (approximately $210,000) in costs and litigation expenses, with back interest at 9% per year. The court also ordered AAI to pay INR9.625 million (approximately $135,800) that Aer Lingus incurred to keep a bank guarantee in place for the 27 years – also with interest.

== Corporate affairs ==
=== Business trends ===
Key trends for Aer Lingus are (as at year ending 31 December):

Year	Total revenue (€m)	Net profit (€m)	Number of employees (FTE) (Note: on average)	Number of passengers (m)	Passenger load factor (%)	Number of aircraft (Note: at year end)	References
2007	1,284	105	3,905	9.3	75.4	41	
2008	1,357	−107	4,035	10.0	72.8	42	
2009	1,205	−130	3,844	10.4	74.5	44	
2010	1,215	43.0	3,516	9.3	76.1	44	
2011	1,288	71.2	3,491	9.5	75.6	43	
2012	1,393	33.9	3,566	9.7	77.7	44	
2013	1,425	34.1	3,615	9.6	78.4	47	
2014	1,557	−95.8	3,766	9.8	79.0	50	
2015	1,718	118	2,753	10.1	81.6	49	
2016	1,766	205	2,711	10.4	81.6	51	
2017	1,859	234	2,662	10.9	81.2	53	
2018	2,020	258	2,658	11.3	80.9	56	
2019	2,125	225	2,646	11.6	81.8	58	
2020	467	−502	1,609	2.1	46.4	56	
2021	366	−338	2,472	2.0	48.0	57	
2022	1,667	−23.0	2,283	9.0	77.0	56	
2023	2,147	169	2,279	10.8	81.0	57	
2024	2,376	205	2,237	11.0	81.0	58	
2025	2,411	273	4,042	11.34	79.0	63	

=== Ownership ===
Aer Lingus was listed on the Irish and London Stock Exchanges, under ticker EIL1 on the Irish Stock Exchange and ticker AERL on the London Stock Exchange. However, it was delisted on 17 September 2015 following its majority acquisition by IAG. Shareholdings (as of 2 September 2015) are:

Shareholder	Shares	Interest
International Airlines Group		98.05%
Other investors		1.95%
Total	534,040,090	100.00%

==== Aer Lingus Cargo ====
Aer Lingus Cargo is the airline's cargo division. It uses reserved areas of passenger aircraft cargo-holds. Aer Lingus Cargo is available on all routes to the US from Dublin and Shannon. Cargo services are also offered on most European routes and some routes to the UK, the division subsequently rebranded as IAG Cargo.

==== Aer Lingus Regional ====
Aer Lingus Regional flights have been operated by Emerald Airlines on a franchise basis since 17 March 2022.

Aer Lingus had a franchise agreement with Irish regional airline Stobart Air (formerly Aer Arann), under which Stobart Air operated several routes under the Aer Lingus Regional brand, livery and flight code. Stobart Air had not operated any flights under its own RE code since April 2012, and all its routes were transferred to Aer Lingus with flight numbers in the EI3XXX range. Stobart Air was placed into liquidation in June 2021; Aer Lingus and BA CityFlyer stepped in to operate the routes on a temporary basis.

=== Business model ===
Aer Lingus adopted a "small frills" strategic approach – a hybrid between a traditional legacy airline and a low-cost carrier. The difference lies in the services offered on short-haul and long-haul flights with meals offered free on the latter only.

The new strategy required considerable negotiation with the unions, and a consensus was reached that lower costs and a reinvention of the airline were necessary for its survival. The union concessions that arose from the negotiations were detrimental to the airline's image however; by 2003, the wage freeze had been lifted and there were 3,800 voluntary redundancies with no forced layoffs. These factors contributed to the airline's reported profits in 2002, 2003 and 2005, with only a small loss recorded in 2004.

=== Head office ===
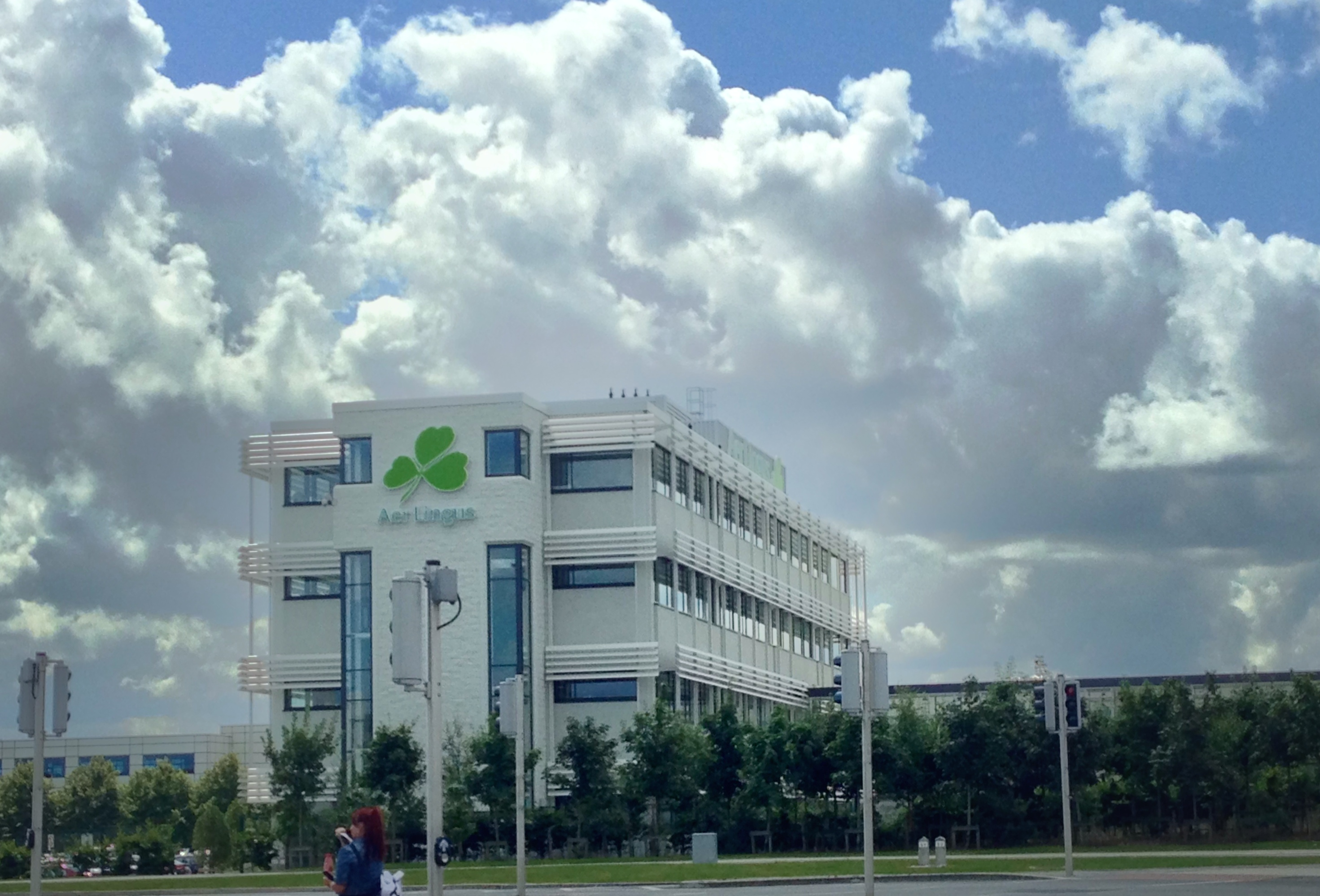
Aer Lingus's head office

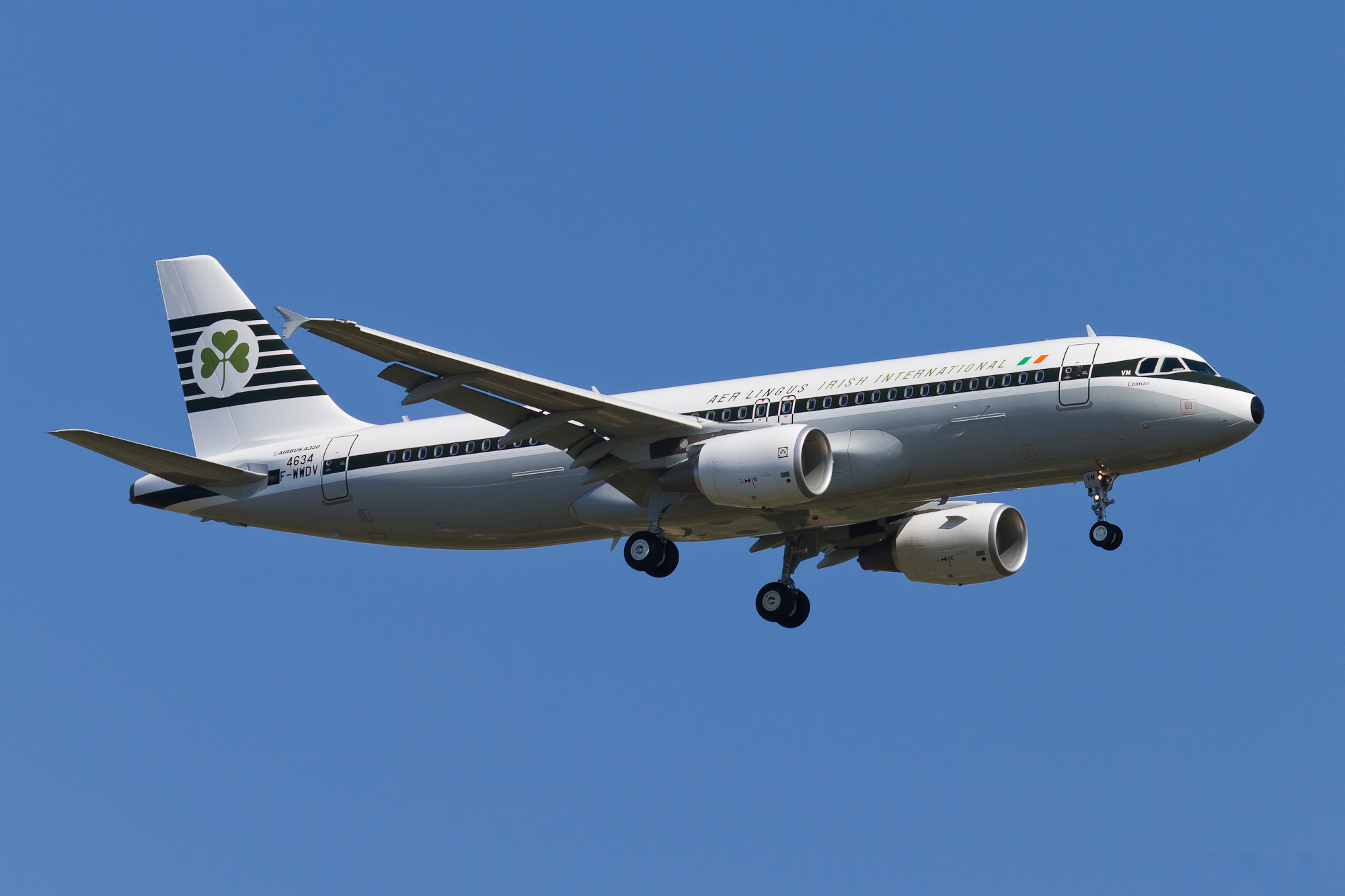
Airbus A320-200 in the retro livery, 2011

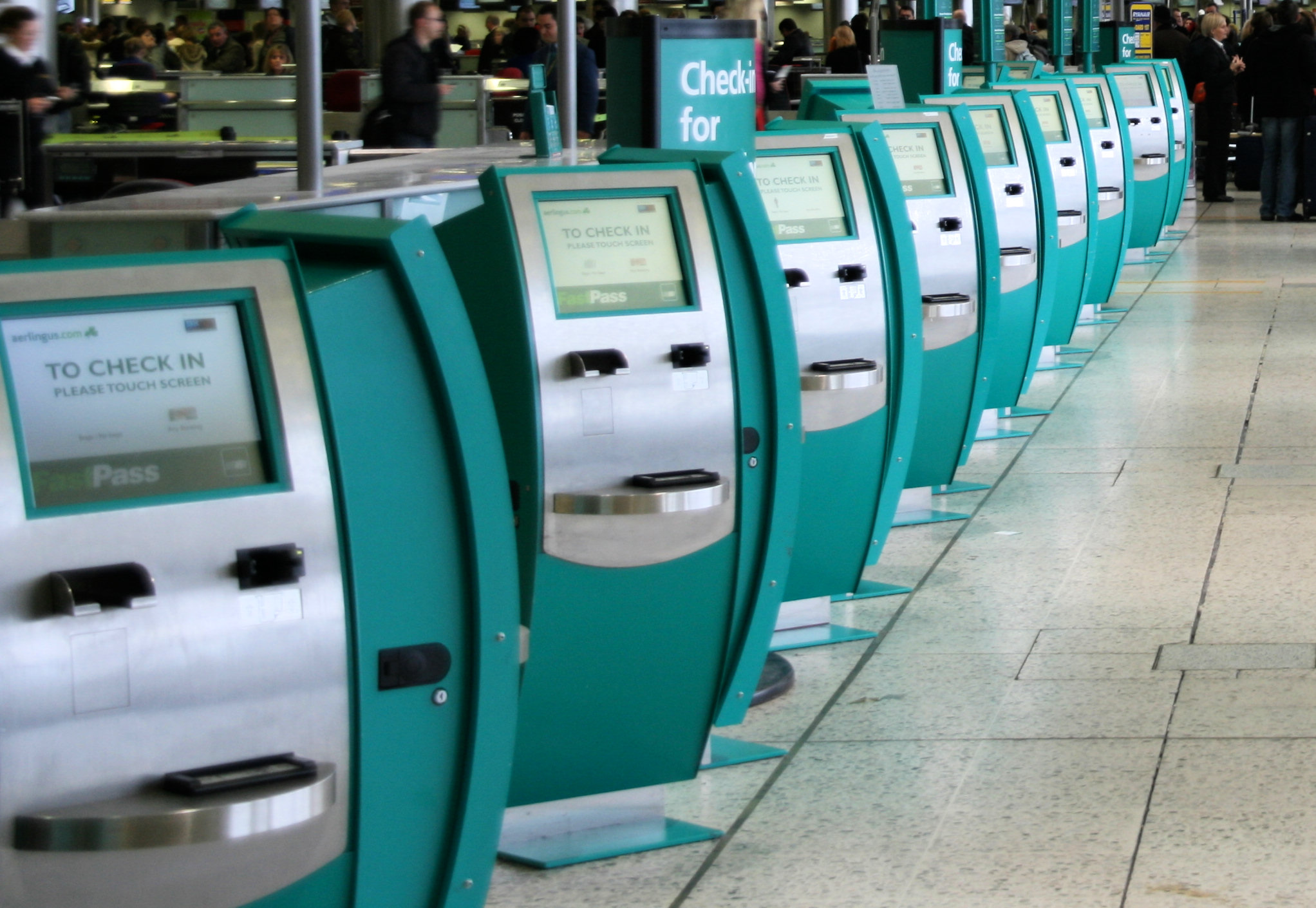
Self-check-in machines of Aer Lingus at Dublin Airport

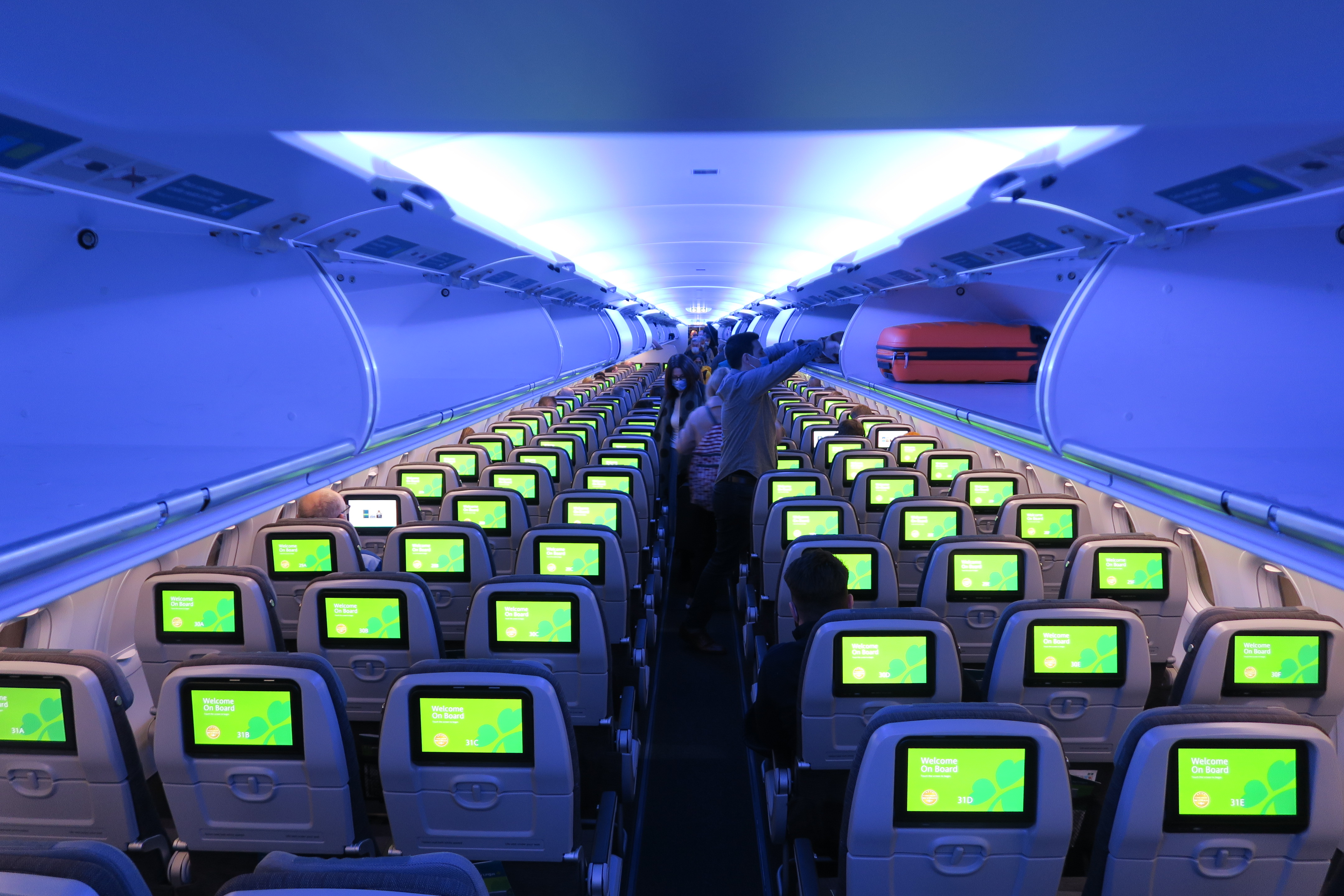
Interior of an Aer Lingus Airbus A321LR

The Aer Lingus head office is located on the grounds of Dublin Airport in Fingal, County Dublin. Dublin Airport Authority (DAA) renovated an existing building to create Aer Lingus's headquarters.

The HOB Site, the 9.9-acre (4.0 ha) former head office site includes the former head office building, the services annexe, the Iolar House, the Mock-Up Building, the ALSAA swimming pool, and various smaller structures and buildings. The Head Office Building housed the corporate head office of Aer Lingus and its subsidiaries, and many administrative functions, employees, and car parking spaces, were located in this building. The Iolar House and Mock-Up Building housed training facilities for Aer Lingus crew and office space. This former head office is proximate to the former Ryanair head office. Brian Lavery of The New York Times said in 2004 that the proximity, described by Lavery as "a few parking lots away," was "a symbol of just how close the competition is to home." In 2010, Aer Lingus announced that it surrendered the lease on its head office building to the Dublin Airport Authority and that it would move its employees to Hangar 6 and other buildings in the airline's property portfolio during the year of 2011. The airline said that its head office building, which was stated by the International Business Times to require refurbishing, was too large for the company's needs following the "Greenfield" cost reduction programme. On 8 November 2011, Aer Lingus signed the contract with the Dublin Airport Authority for the surrender of the leasehold interest in the HOB Site. Aer Lingus would pay €22.15 million and interest to the DAA, with €10.55 million being paid over ten years in annual payments, with each being equal size. The payments will involve a 5% interest rate per annum. The former HOB Site was redeveloped into Dublin Airport Central, with the Dublin Airport Authority planning to spend €10 million. The former head office became One, Dublin Airport Central.

=== Employee relations ===
On 30 May 2014, Aer Lingus cabin crew staged a 24-hour strike resulting in the cancellation of around 200 flights and the disruption of travel plans by up to 200,000 people. The workers were seeking changes to their rosters, which the airline said that if implemented would mean the loss of 300 jobs in Ireland, which would have to be relocated to North America.

=== Sponsorships ===
Aer Lingus sponsored the Irish Times International Fiction Prize from 1989 to 1992, when it was also known as the Irish Times/Aer Lingus International Fiction Prize.

On 30 April 2015, it was announced that Aer Lingus would become the official airline of the Irish Rugby Team. On the same day, it was announced that one aircraft was to be renamed "Green Spirit" and wear a special livery for the Irish Rugby Team. Another aircraft would also be painted in the same livery.

Since 2016, Aer Lingus has sponsored the Aer Lingus College Football Classic gridiron football game, which features two American-based collegiate teams. All editions of the game have been played at Dublin's Aviva Stadium in August, with the game having been played annually since 2022.

== Destinations and hubs ==
As of June 2024, Aer Lingus flies to 93 destinations throughout Europe and North America; including destinations in Austria, Belgium, Canada, Croatia, France, Germany, Greece, Ireland, Italy, the Netherlands, Poland, Portugal, Spain, Switzerland, Turkey, the United Kingdom and the United States.

In October 2022, it was announced that Aer Lingus operations between Belfast City and London Heathrow would transfer to Aer Lingus UK due to Brexit-related requirements that a European carrier could no longer fly domestic routes within the United Kingdom. These flights were operated by British Airways under wet-lease terms using the Aer Lingus UK flight numbers and callsigns.

=== Hubs, focus cities and operating bases ===
- Dublin – the airline's main hub, serving European, North American, North African, and a majority of its UK-based routes. Dublin is the airline's primary maintenance base.
- Cork – Despite recent cutbacks, Cork is still an important Aer Lingus base. Three aircraft are based at the airport, operating a mix of regular and seasonal services to the UK and mainland Europe.
- Shannon – Aer Lingus operates flights to London-Heathrow and Paris-Charles de Gaulle which they use to feed their daily flights to Boston and New York-JFK.
- Belfast – Services to Great Britain.

=== Codeshare agreements ===
Aer Lingus has codeshare agreements with the following airlines:

- Air Canada
- Alaska Airlines
- American Airlines
- British Airways
- Iberia
- JetBlue
- Qatar Airways
- TUI Airways
- Vueling

=== Interline agreements ===
Aer Lingus has interline agreements with the following airlines:

- Loganair
- Virgin Atlantic

== Fleet ==
=== Current fleet ===
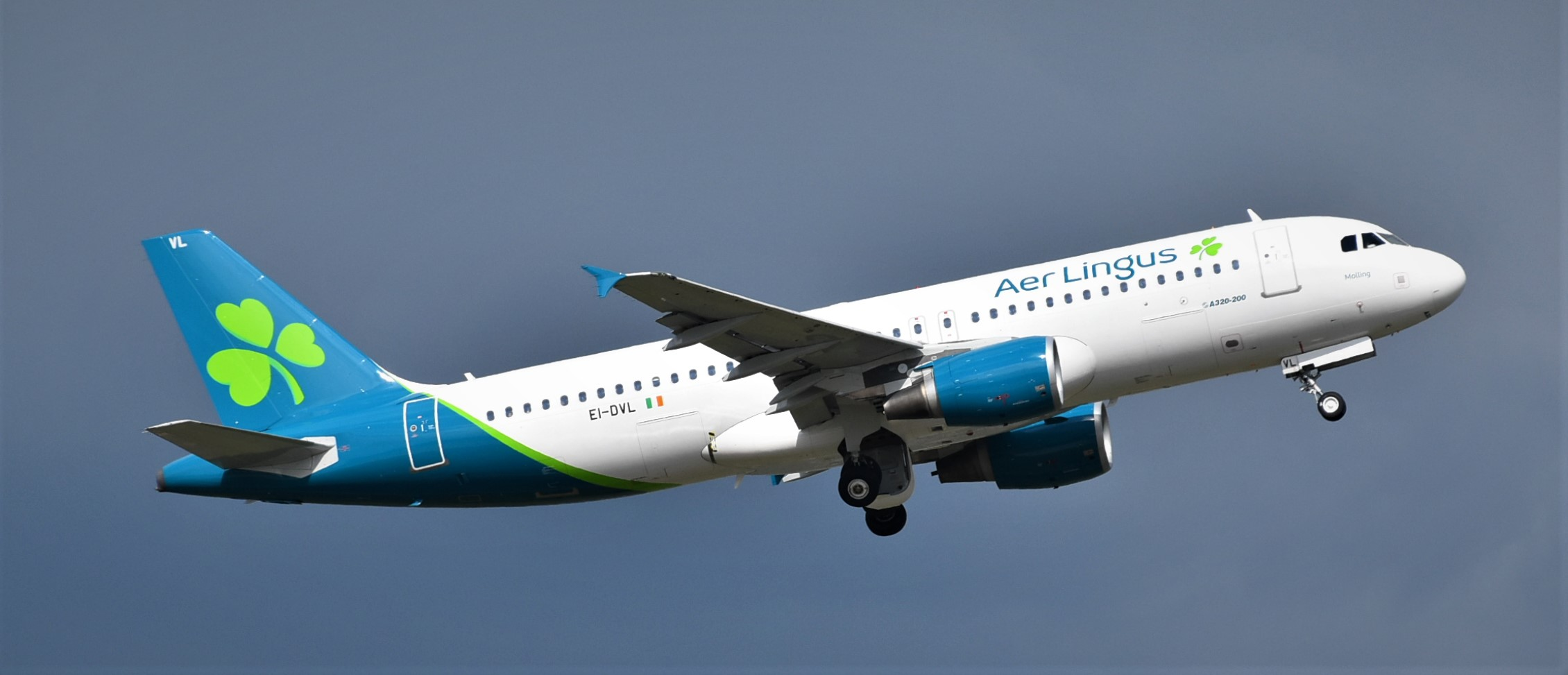
Aer Lingus Airbus A320-200

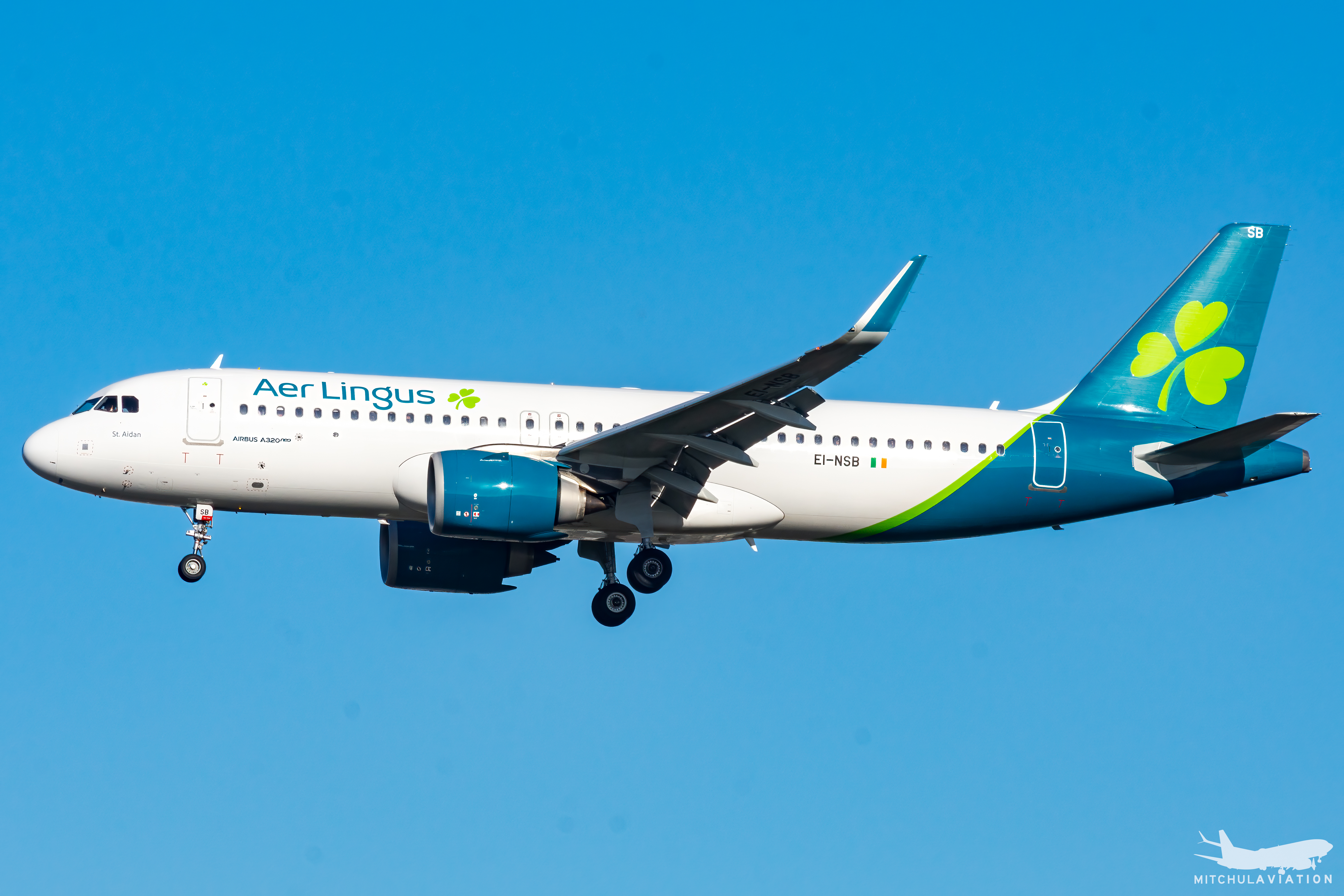
Aer Lingus Airbus A320neo

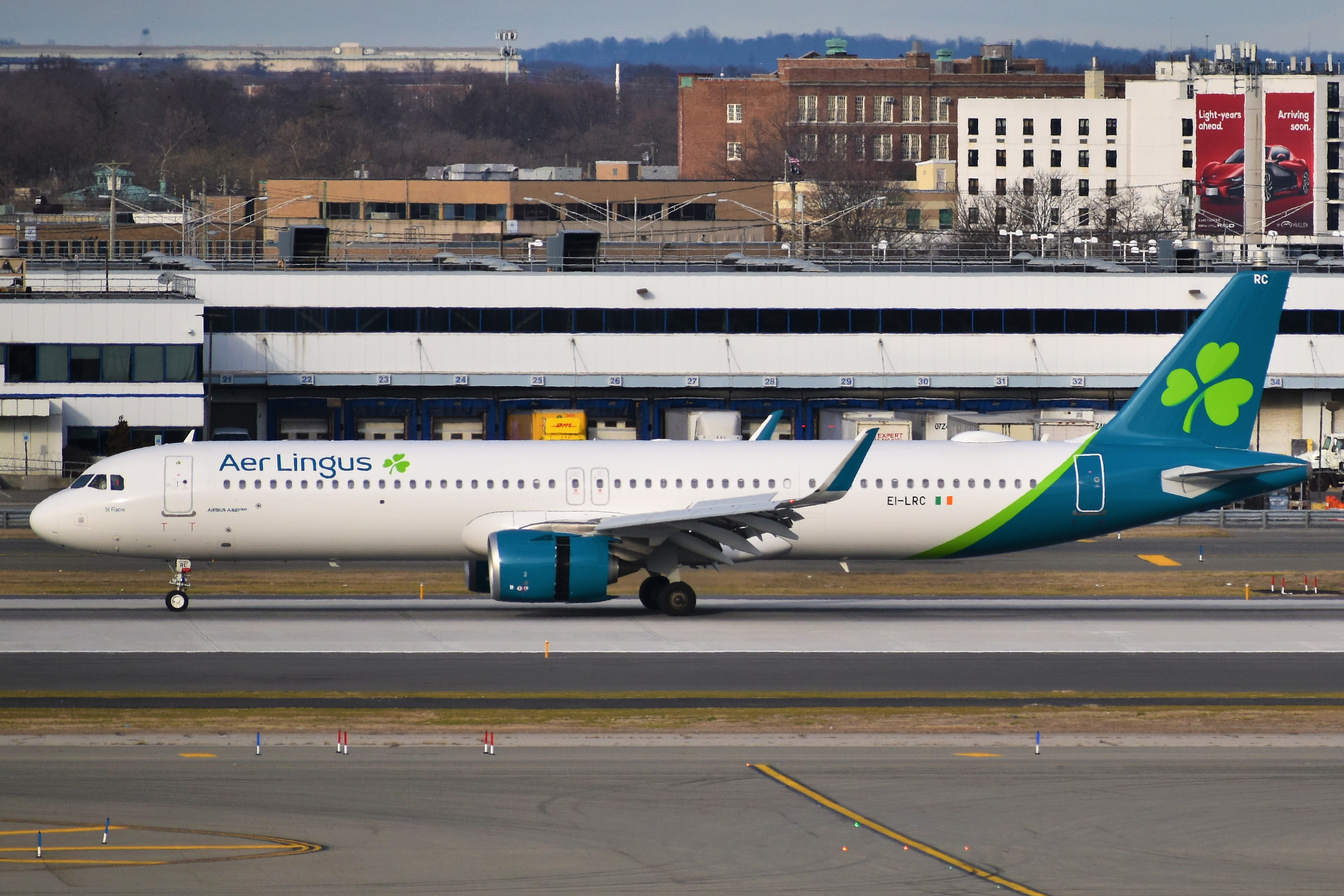
Aer Lingus Airbus A321LR

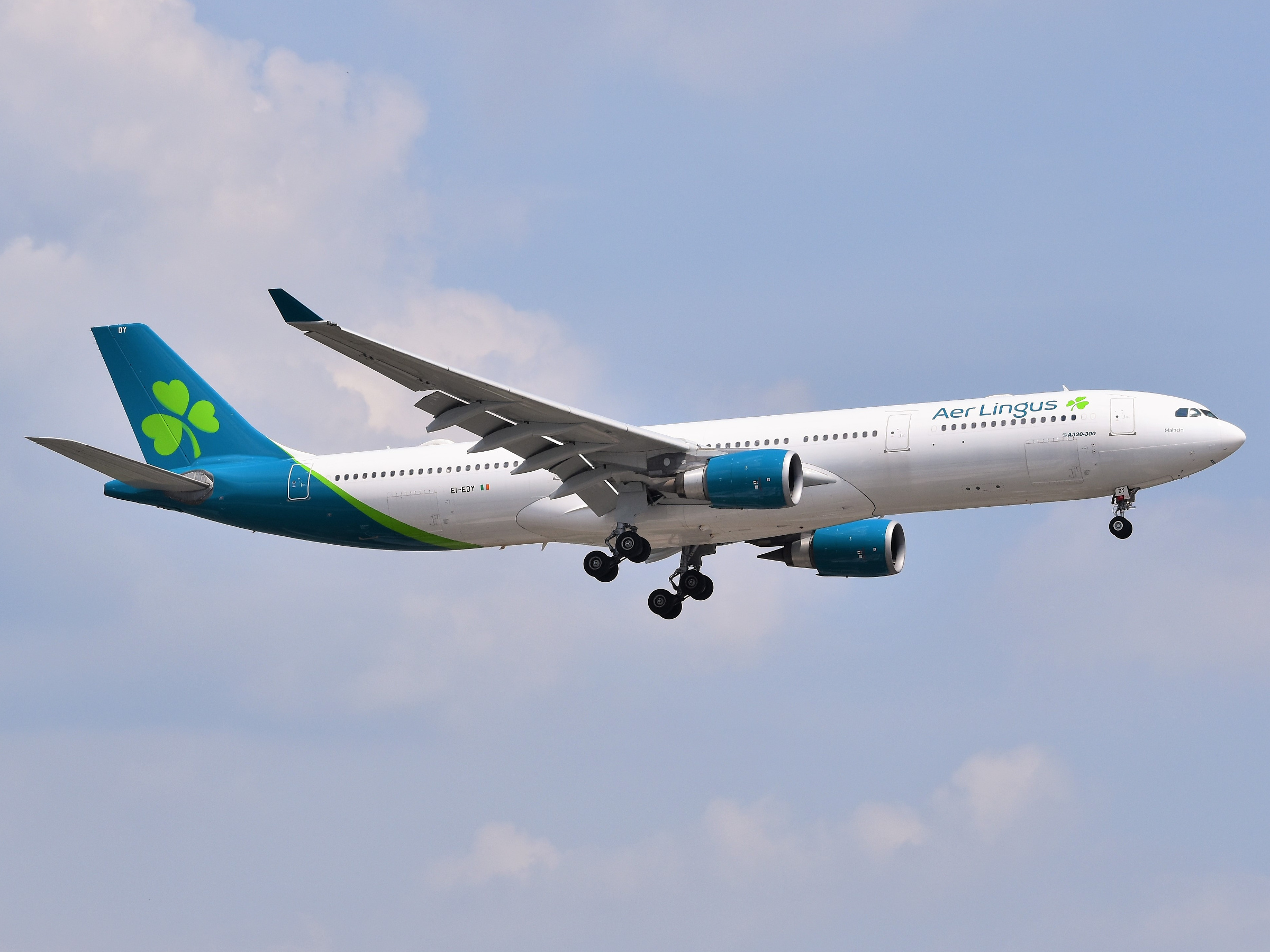
Aer Lingus Airbus A330-300

As of July 2026, Aer Lingus operates the following aircraft:

Aer Lingus fleet
Aircraft	In service	Orders	Passengers			Notes
Aircraft	In service	Orders	J	Y	Total	Notes
Airbus A320-200	27	—	—	174	174	
Airbus A320neo	8	1	—	186	186	
Airbus A321LR	8	—	16	168	184	
Airbus A321XLR	6	—	16	168	184	
Airbus A330-200	3	—	23	243	266	
Airbus A330-200	3	—	23	248	271	
Airbus A330-200	3	—	23	258	281	
Airbus A330-300	12	—	30	283	313	
Airbus A330-300	12	—	30	287	317	
Total	64	1				

Aer Lingus aircraft are named after Christian saints from Ireland.

=== Fleet development ===
In January 2017, Aer Lingus announced its intention to finalise an order for eight Airbus A321LR narrow-bodies to develop thinner transatlantic routes which cannot be operated profitably and fuel efficiently using wide-body A330s. As of November 2018, the airline has orders for 14 A321LRs.

At the 2019 Paris Air Show, Aer Lingus parent International Airlines Group agreed to purchase 14 Airbus A321XLR aircraft, eight for delivery to Iberia and six to Aer Lingus, with options for a further 14 of the aircraft. In April 2020, Aer Lingus terminated their contract with the Irish airline CityJet which operated two BAe Avro RJ85s on behalf of the airline. The aircraft were primarily used for the Dublin to London-City route. The first A321XLR was received by Aer Lingus in December 2024.

On 9 May 2025, IAG ordered up to 76 aircraft from Airbus and Boeing, out of which 32 firm orders and 10 options for the Boeing 787-10 will be allocated to British Airways, and 21 firm orders and 13 options for the Airbus A330-900 will be allocated to Aer Lingus, Iberia, and LEVEL.

=== Historical fleet ===
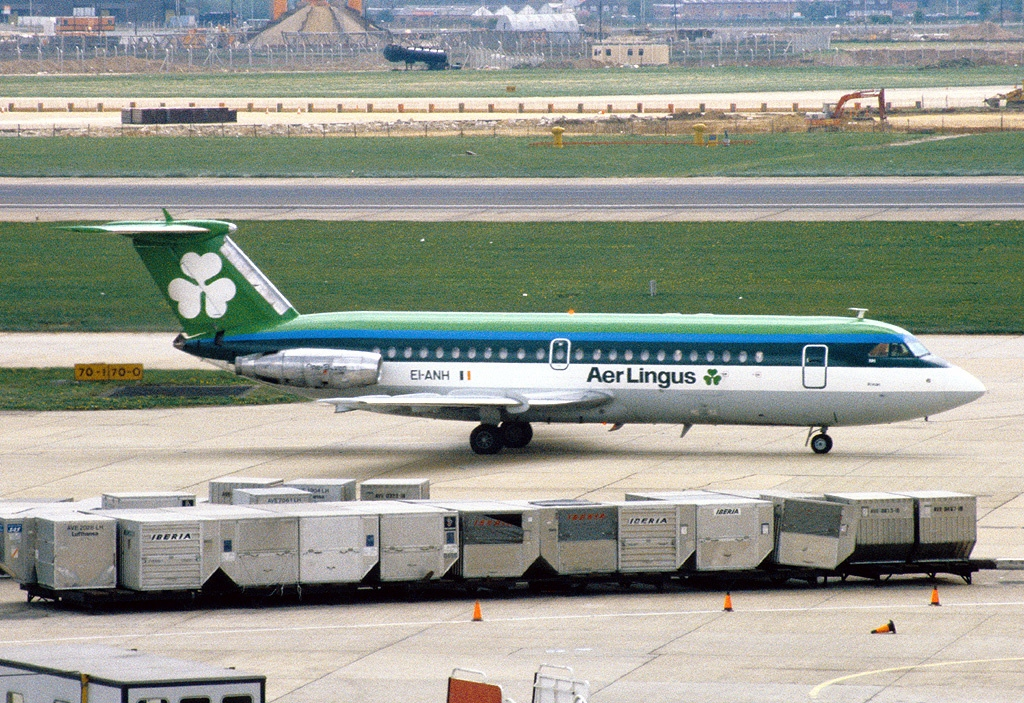
Aer Lingus BAC One-Eleven in 1982

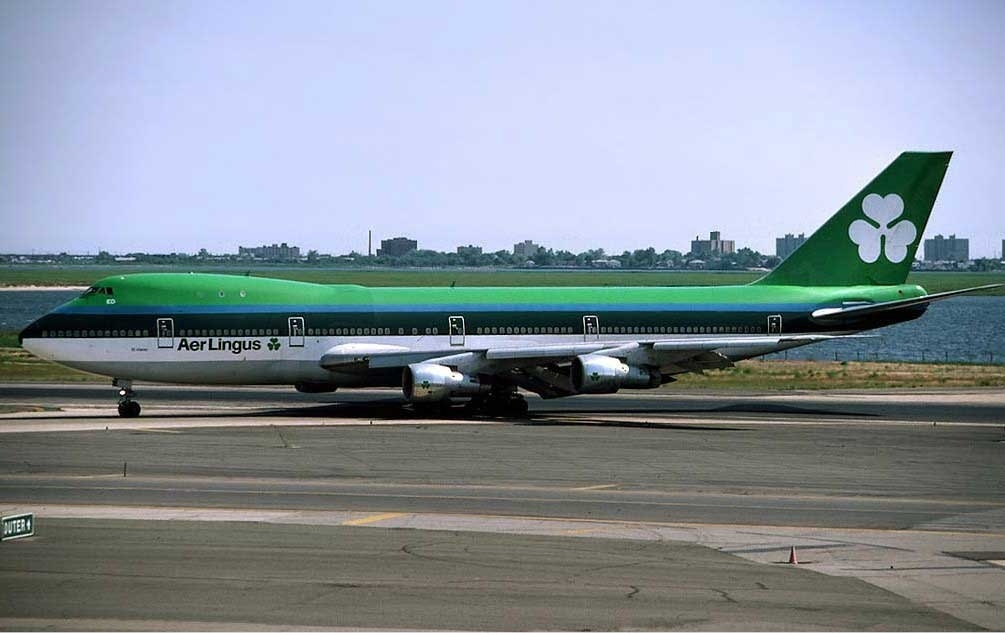
Aer Lingus Boeing 747-100 in 1980

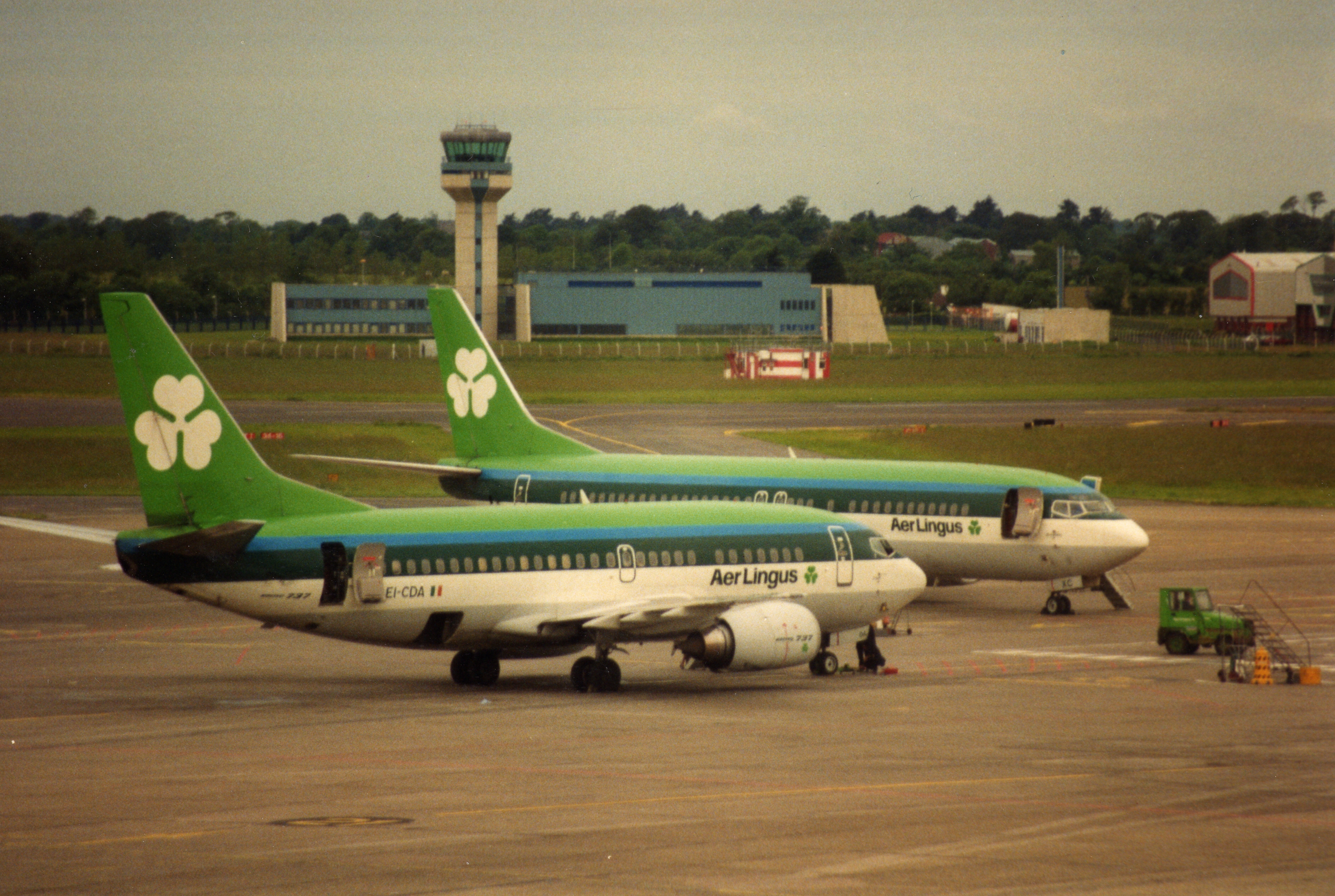
Two Aer Lingus Boeing 737 aircraft in 1993

- Airbus A319
- Airbus A321
- Airspeed Consul
- ATR 42 (operated by Stobart Air for Aer Lingus Regional)
- Aviation Traders Carvair
- BAC One-Eleven
- BAe 146
- Boeing 737-200
- Boeing 737-300
- Boeing 737-400
- Boeing 737-500
- Boeing 707
- Boeing 720
- Boeing 747-100
- Boeing 757-200 (leased from ASL Airlines Ireland)
- Boeing 767-200ER (leased from Omni Air International)
- Boeing 767-300ER
- Bristol Freighter
- de Havilland DH.84 Dragon
- de Havilland DH.86 Express
- de Havilland DH.89 Dragon Rapide
- Douglas DC-3
- Douglas DC-8F (operated by Aer Turas)
- McDonnell Douglas MD-11 (leased from World Airways)
- Fokker F27
- Fokker 50
- Lockheed Model 14 Super Electra
- Lockheed L-749 Constellation
- Lockheed L-1049 Super Constellation
- Saab 340
- Short 330
- Short 360
- Vickers VC.1 Viking
- Vickers Viscount 700
- Vickers Viscount 800

=== Livery ===
On 17 January 2019, Aer Lingus unveiled a new brand and livery. The refreshed brand includes a new typeface, refreshed shamrock and a new colour scheme. The new livery consists of a white fuselage and teal engines and tail. All Aer Lingus aircraft were expected to receive the new livery by the end of 2021, although some aircraft with the older livery are still in service as of 2024.

1965–1974

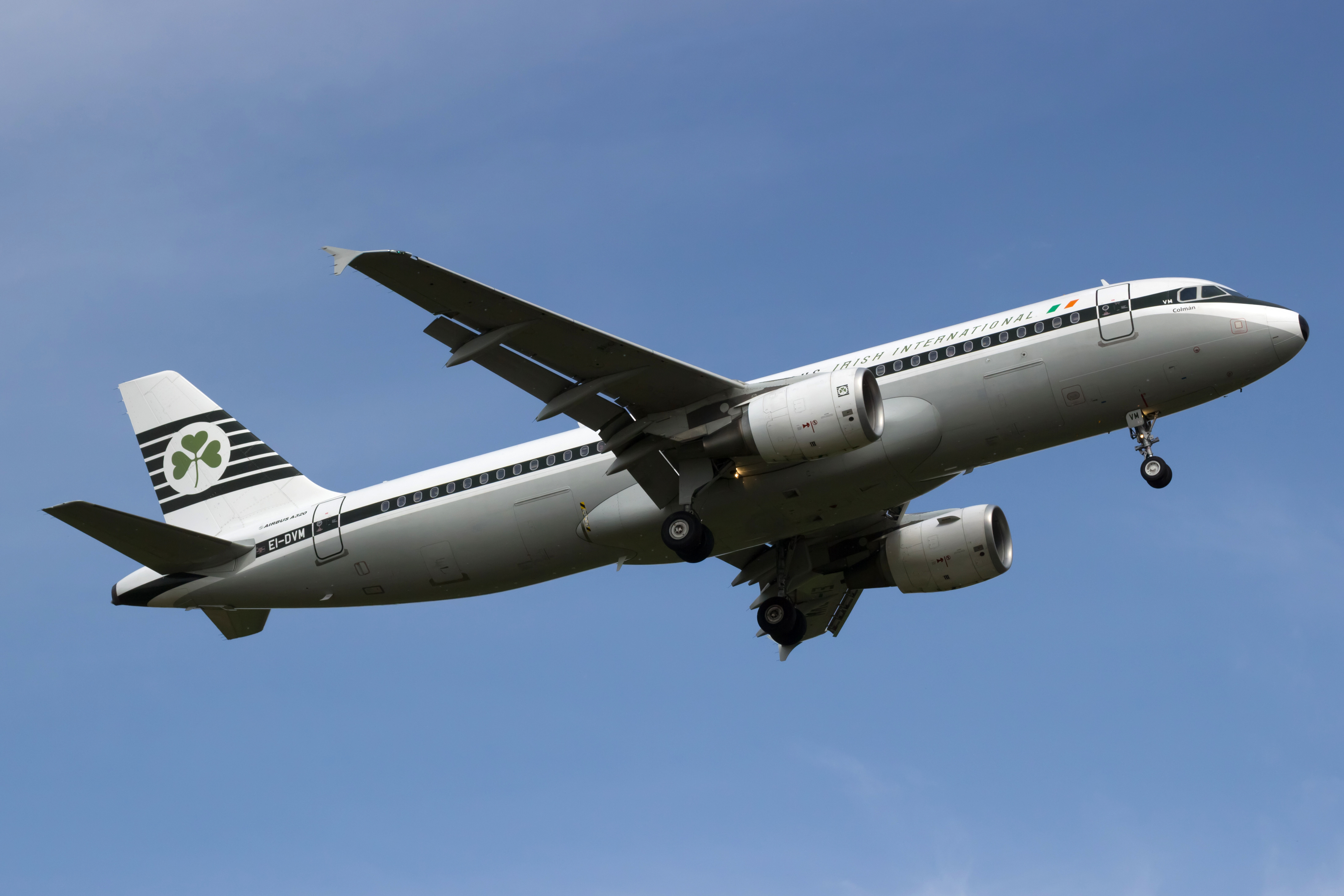

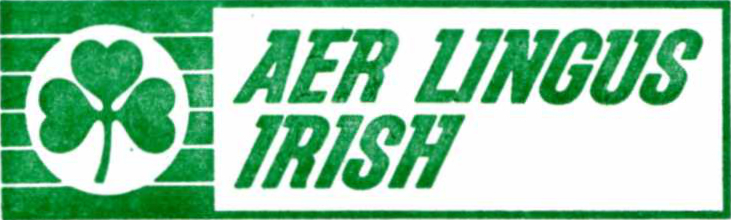

1974–1996

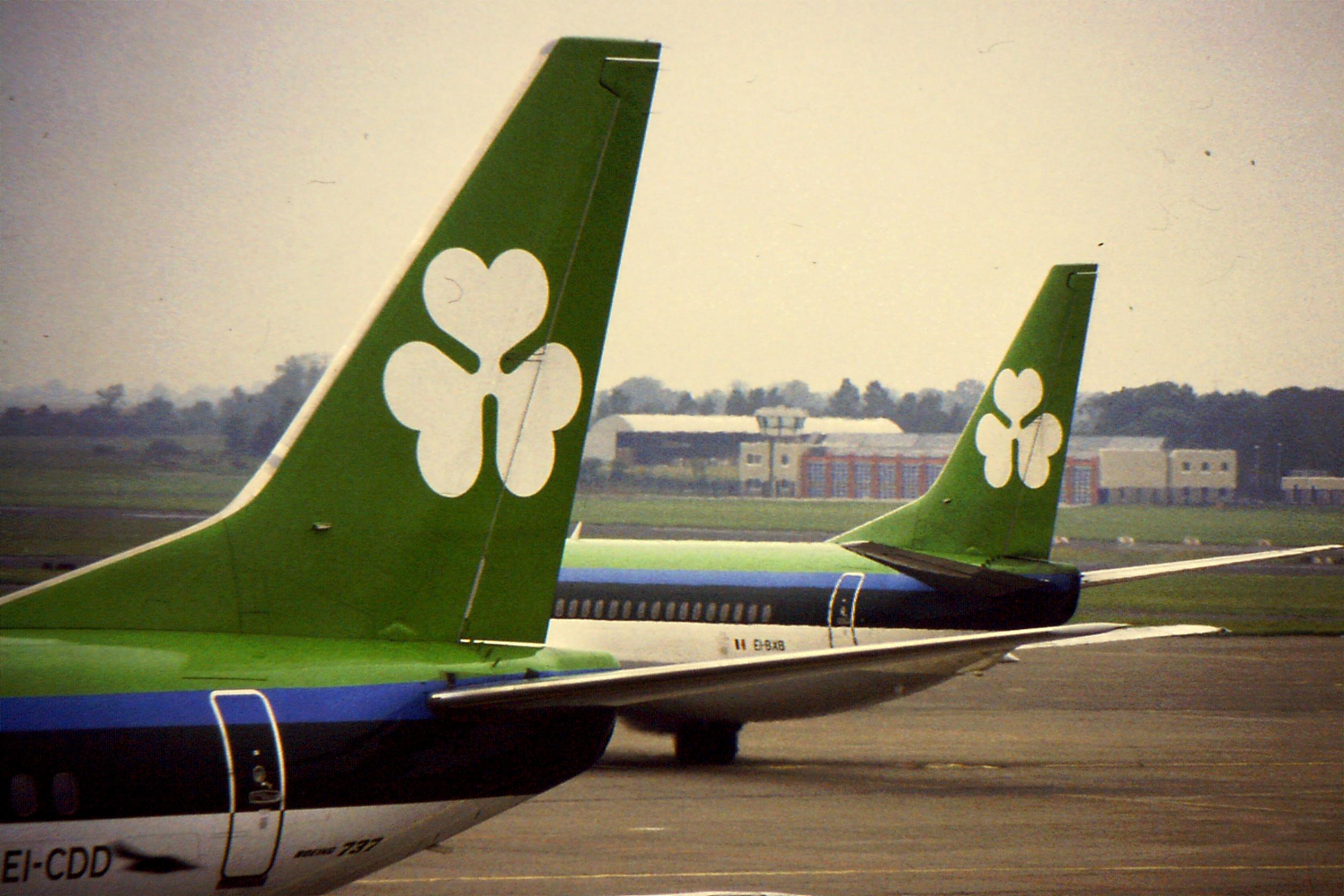

1996–2019

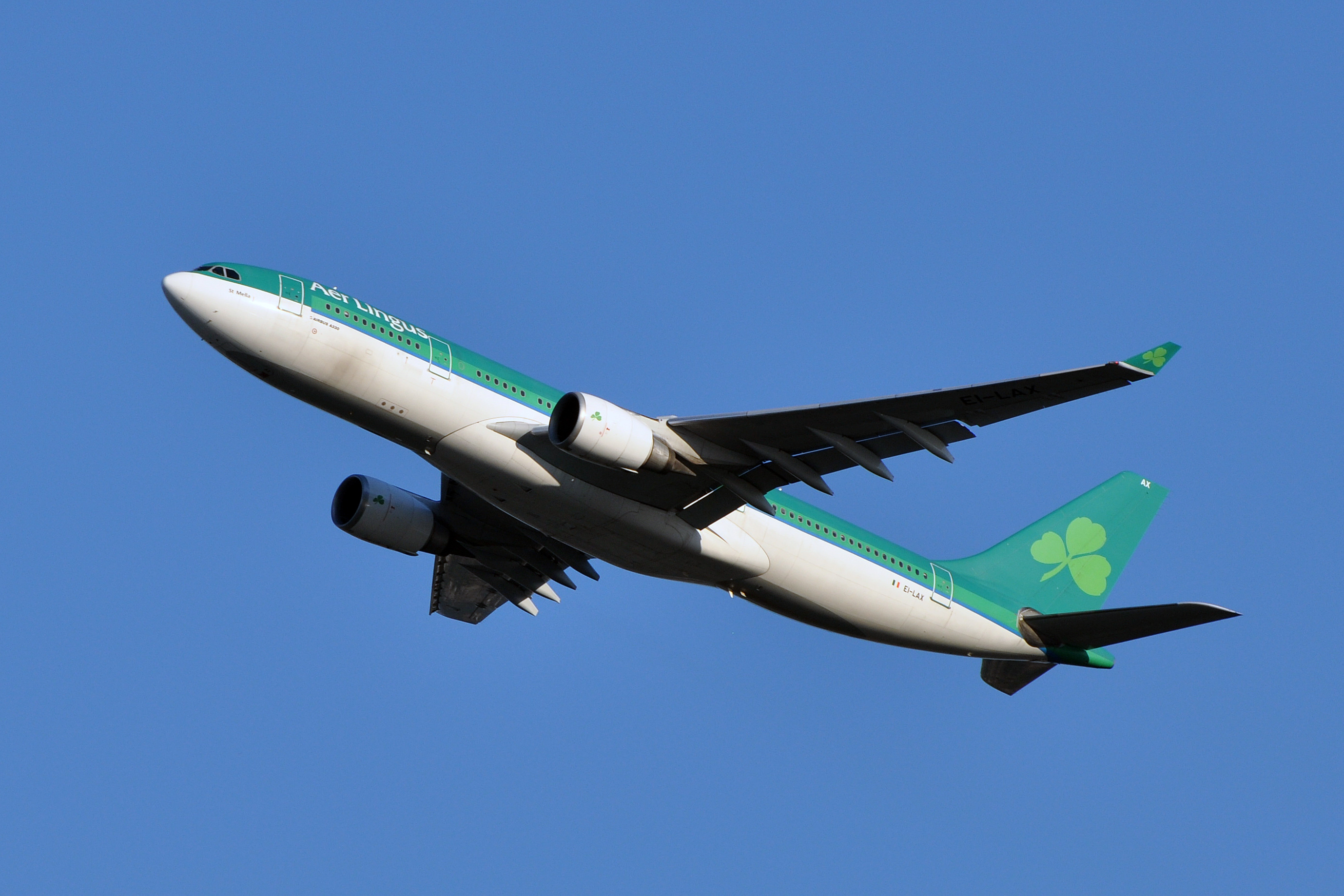

2019–present

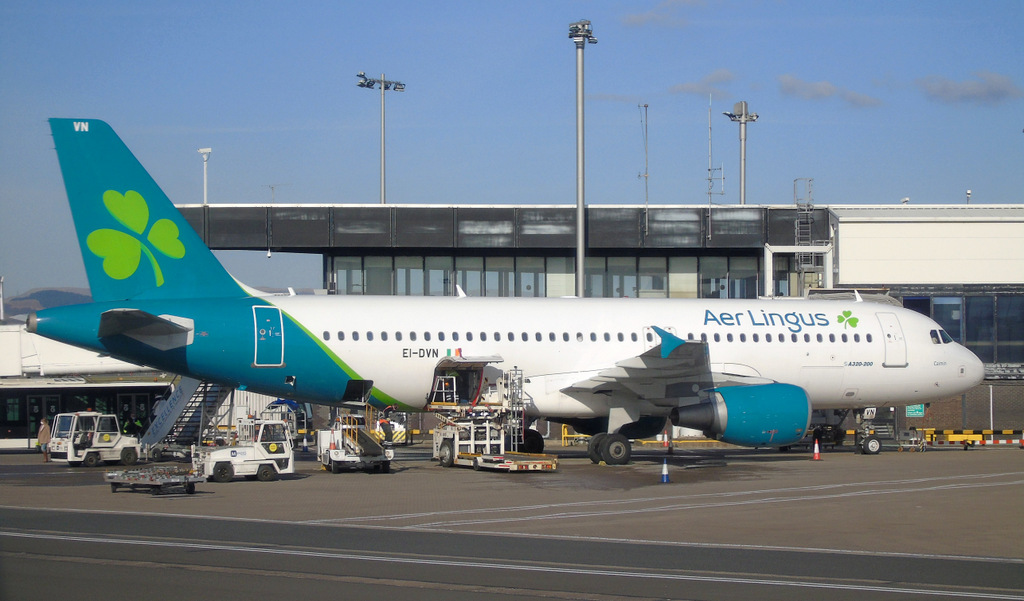

== Services ==
=== In-flight services ===
From 2015 to 2016, Aer Lingus sold pre-packaged Tayto sandwiches on board some of their flights. In 2018, the company announced that it would offer a complimentary glass of wine or beer on transatlantic flights. That year, the company also announced plans to offer free wifi to Smart Fare transatlantic economy customers. In 2019, Aer Lingus introduced AerSpace, its premium economy class.

=== Frequent-flyer programme ===
AerClub is Aer Lingus' frequent-flyer programme. It launched in November 2016, taking over from the airline's previous programme, Gold Circle. AerClub consists of four tiers: the entry-level Green, Silver, Platinum, and Concierge. The club uses Avios points as its member currency.

== Accidents and incidents ==
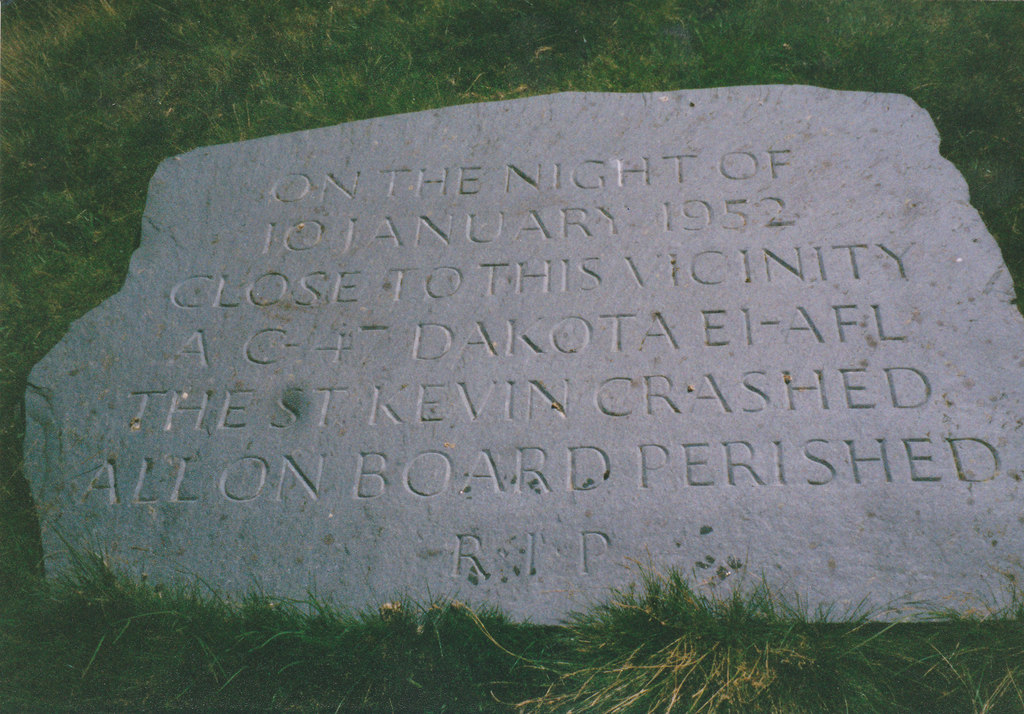
A memorial at the site of the January 1952 crash

Aer Lingus has had 12 incidents, including six accidents which left aircraft written-off (of which three were fatal) and one hijacking.

- On 10 January 1952, a Douglas DC-3 registered EI-AFL and named St. Kevin was en route from Northolt to Dublin. It flew into a mountain wave triggered by Snowdon and an area of extreme turbulence, then crashed in a peat bog near Llyn Gwynant in Snowdonia, killing all 20 passengers and 3 crew. It was the company's first fatal accident.
- On 1 January 1953, a Douglas DC-3 registered EI-ACF and named St. Kieran made a forced landing near the village of Spernall, England. Both engines failed after running out of fuel while en route from Dublin to Birmingham. All of the 25 passengers and crew survived. The aircraft was later written off.
- On 22 June 1967, a Vickers Viscount registered EI-AOF on a pilot-training flight stalled and spun into the ground near Ashbourne, killing all three crew.
- On 21 September 1967, a Vickers Viscount registered EI-AKK flying from Dublin to Bristol encountered problems whilst landing, damaging its wingtip and no.4 propeller on the runway. A go-around was attempted, but rapidly aborted; the aircraft then belly-landing and sliding beyond the end of the runway. All 21 of the passengers and crew survived, but the aircraft was written off.
- On 24 March 1968, Aer Lingus Flight 712, a flight from Cork to London operated by a Vickers Viscount registered EI-AOM, crashed into the sea off the southeast coast of Ireland near Tuskar Rock. All 57 passengers and four crew perished. The crash is generally known as the Tuskar Rock Air Disaster in Ireland. Part of the aircraft's elevator spring tab was found some distance from the rest of the wreckage, suggesting that it had become detached at an earlier stage. However, the original accident report published in 1970, reached no definitive conclusion about the cause of the crash but did not exclude the possibility that another aircraft or airborne object was involved. Following persistent rumours that the aircraft's demise was linked with nearby British military exercises, a review of the case files by the Air Accident Investigation Unit took place in 1998. This review identified several maintenance and record-keeping failures and concluded that the original report failed to adequately examine alternative hypotheses not involving other aircraft. A subsequent investigation concluded that the accident followed an initial unspecified event involving the tail structure, subsequently leading to a major structural failure of the port tailplane. The exact cause was not positively identified, but was likely due to corrosion, fatigue, or possibly a birdstrike. The possibility that another aircraft was involved was ruled out.
- On 2 May 1981, Aer Lingus Flight 164 from Dublin to London was hijacked and diverted to Le Touquet – Côte d'Opale Airport in France. While authorities negotiated with the hijacker by radio in the cockpit, French special forces entered the rear of the aircraft and overpowered him. None of the passengers or crew were injured during the hijacking. The official record shows the reason as One hijacker demanded to be taken to Iran. Plane stormed/hijacker arrested. Duration of the hijacking: less than one day. while various media reports indicated that the man, Laurence Downey (a former Trappist monk), demanded that the Pope release the third secret of Fátima.
- On 31 January 1986, Aer Lingus Flight 328, a Short 360 registration EI-BEM on a flight from Dublin to East Midlands Airport, struck power lines and crashed short of the runway. There were no fatalities but two passengers were injured in the accident.
- On 9 June 2005, Aer Lingus Flight 132, an Airbus A330 registration EI-ORD, nearly collided with US Airways Flight 1170 at Logan International Airport in Boston, after both flights were given nearly simultaneous clearances for takeoff on intersecting runways. The US Airways flight kept its nose down on the runway for an extended amount of time to go underneath the Aer Lingus flight and avoided a collision. There were no fatalities.
- On 6 October 2016, Aer Lingus Flight 121, an Airbus A330-202 registration EI-DUO suffered a fire when equipment being used to unload the aircraft at the aft right hand cargo door caught fire at Orlando International Airport, injuring two ground handlers.
- On 22 December 2024, an Aer Lingus ATR 72 (operated by Emerald Airlines) flight code EA701P, suffered a nose wheel collapse on landing at Belfast City Airport. As the flight was a positioning flight, no passengers were onboard and no injuries or casualties were reported. It was reported that there were severe winds in the vicinity at the time.

== See also ==
- Transport in Ireland
- Aer Lingus UK
