= Colleary =

Colleary is a surname. Notable people with the surname include:

- Brian Colleary, American former football coach and college athletics administrator
- Michael Colleary, American film producer, screenwriter and television writer
- Patrick Colleary, Irish Roman Catholic priest
- R.J. Colleary (born 1957), American television producer and writer
- Robert M. Colleary (1929–2012), American comedy writer and producer
- William B. Colleary (1890–1973), American architect
- Eibhlín Ní Chathailriabhaigh (Evelyn Colleary) (1910–2001), Irish language activist

== See also ==
- Bernard Collaery (born 1944), Australian politician and lawyer
