= 2026 Pittsburgh Steelers season =

94th season in franchise history

- Owner: The Rooney Family
- General manager: Omar Khan
- President: Art Rooney II
- Head coach: Mike McCarthy
- Offensive coordinator: Brian Angelichio
- Defensive coordinator: Patrick Graham
- Home stadium: Acrisure Stadium

Results
- Record: 6–4
- Division place: 3rd AFC North

Uniform
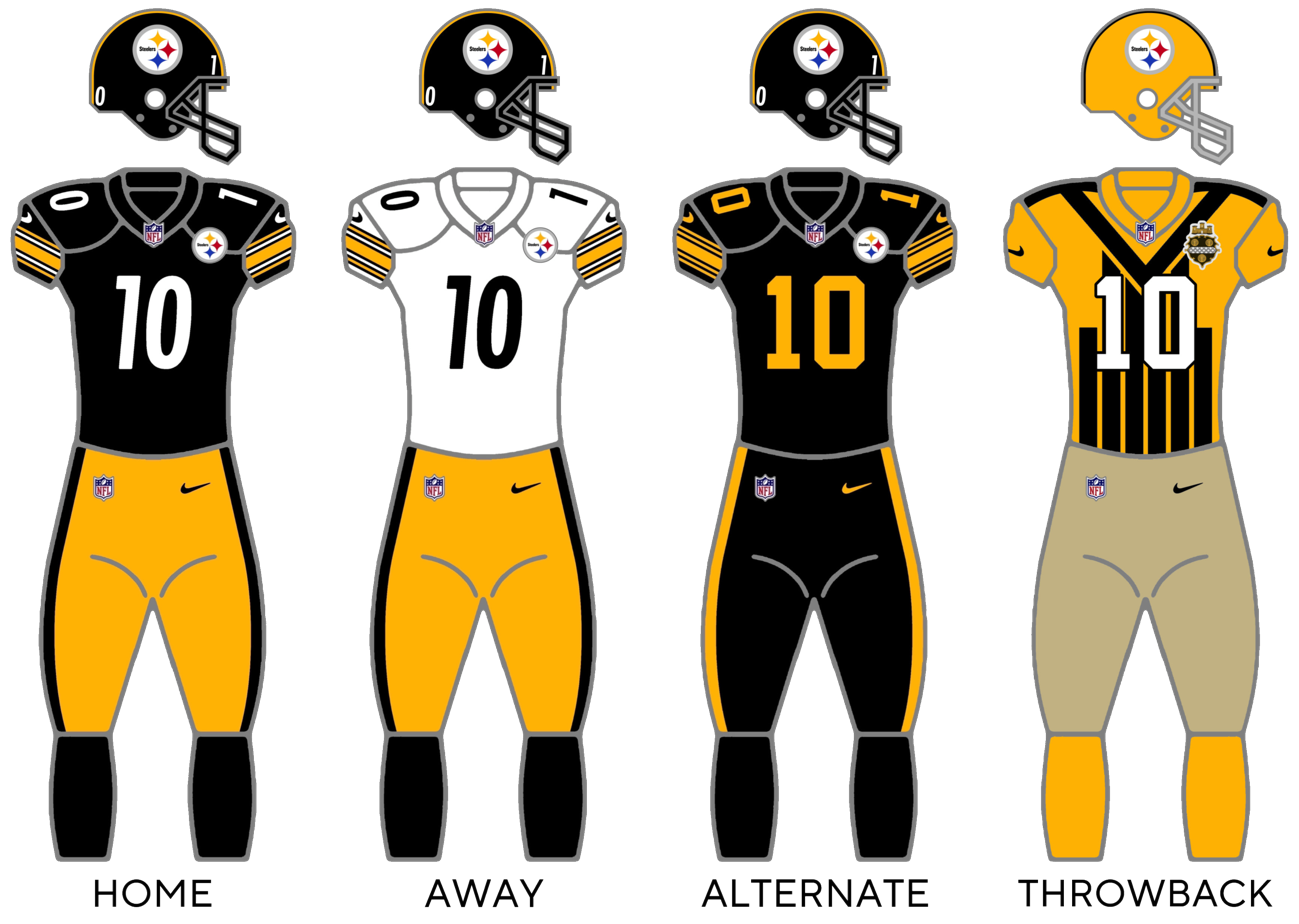

The 2026 season is the Pittsburgh Steelers' 94th season in the National Football League (NFL), their 26th year playing their home games at Acrisure Stadium, their fifth under general manager Omar Khan, and their first under new head coach Mike McCarthy.

This is their first season since 2006 without longtime head coach Mike Tomlin, as he stepped down on January 13 following their defeat in the Wild Card round the night before. The Steelers are attempting to improve on their 10–7 record of the past three seasons and will attempt to end their seven-game playoff game losing streak dating back to the 2016 season. This season began with only the team's fourth head coach in 58 seasons. This is McCarthy's third head coaching job; he was previously the head coach of the Green Bay Packers from 2006 to 2018 and the Dallas Cowboys from 2020 to 2024. Coincidentally, the Steelers opened their first preseason with Mike McCarthy as their head coach by beating McCarthy's first team, the Packers. The Steelers also played in the NFL International Series in back-to-back seasons for the first time in franchise history. This will be Aaron Rodgers's 22nd and final season in the NFL, as he announced on May 20 he would retire after the season.

== Offseason ==
=== Signings ===
Position	Player	Tag	Previous team	Date signed	Notes
CB	Jamel Dean	UFA	Tampa Bay Buccaneers	March 13	3 years, $36.75 million
RB	Rico Dowdle	UFA	Carolina Panthers	March 13	2 years, $12.25 million
DT	Sebastian Joseph-Day	UFA	Tennessee Titans	March 16	2 years, $11 million
S	Jaquan Brisker	UFA	Chicago Bears	March 16	1 year, $5.5 million

=== Trades ===
Trades below are only for trades that included a player. Draft pick-only trades will go in the draft section.

Date	Player(s)/Asset(s) received	Team	Player(s)/Asset(s) traded	Source
March 13	WR Michael Pittman Jr., 2026 7th round selection (No. 230)	Indianapolis Colts	2026 6th round selection (No. 214)	

== Draft ==
2026 Pittsburgh Steelers draft selections
Round	Selection	Player	Position	College	Notes
1	21	Max Iheanachor	OT	Arizona State	
2	47	Germie Bernard	WR	Alabama	From Colts
2	53	Traded to the Indianapolis Colts			
3	76	Drew Allar	QB	Penn State	From Cowboys
3	85	Daylen Everette	CB	Georgia	
3	96	Gennings Dunker	G	Iowa	From Seahawks
4	121	Kaden Wetjen	WR	Iowa	
4	135	Traded to the Indianapolis Colts			Compensatory selection
5	161	Traded to the Kansas City Chiefs			
5	169	Riley Nowakowski	TE	Indiana	From Rams via Chiefs
6	202	Traded to the New England Patriots			
6	210	Gabriel Rubio	DE	Notre Dame	From Rams via Chiefs
6	214	Traded to the Indianapolis Colts			Compensatory selection
6	216	Traded to the Seattle Seahawks			Compensatory selection
7	224	Robert Spears-Jennings	SS	Oklahoma	From Saints via Patriots
7	230	Eli Heidenreich	RB	Navy	From Colts
7	237	Traded to the Indianapolis Colts			
7	249	Traded to the Kansas City Chiefs			Compensatory selection

2026 Pittsburgh Steelers undrafted free agents
Name	Position	College	Ref.
Devan Boykin	CB	Indiana	
Daylan Carnell	LB	Missouri	
Kevin Jobity Jr.	DL	Syracuse	
Laith Marjan	K	Kansas	
Lake McRee	TE	USC	
Chamon Metayer	TE	Arizona State	
Greg Crippen	C	Michigan	
Alex Tecza	RB	Navy	

Draft trades

- The Steelers traded a 2027 sixth-round selection and WR George Pickens to the Dallas Cowboys in exchange for a third-round selection and a 2027 fifth-round selection.
- The Steelers traded a sixth-round selection to the New England Patriots in exchange for a seventh-round selection and S Kyle Dugger.

== Staff ==
Pittsburgh Steelers staff
Front office: Owner/president – Art Rooney II; Vice president – Art Rooney Jr.; Vice president of player personnel – Dan Rooney Jr.; General manager – Omar Khan; Assistant general manager – Andy Weidl; Director of player scouting – Mark Sadowski; Director of pro personnel – Max Gruder; Senior director of college personnel - Tim Gribble; Director of college scouting – Dan Colbert; Senior personnel executive – Sheldon White; Senior personnel assistant – Quentin Harris; Senior director of football strategy and administration – Cole Marcoux; Director of player development – Darrel Young; Football analytics coordinator – Tosin Kazeem; Head coaches: Head coach – Mike McCarthy; Assistant head coach/secondary – Joe Whitt Jr.; Offensive coaches: Offensive coordinator – Brian Angelichio; Quarterbacks – Tom Arth; Running backs – Ramon Chinyoung Sr.; Wide receivers – Adam Henry; Tight ends – Robert Kugler; Offensive line – James Campen; Assistant offensive line – Jahri Evans; Game management/quarterbacks – Tim Berbenich; Senior offensive assistant – Frank Cignetti Jr.; Offensive quality control – Eric Simonelli	Defensive coaches: Defensive coordinator – Patrick Graham; Defensive line – Domata Peko; Outside linebackers – C. J. Ah You; Inside linebackers – Scott McCurley; Defensive pass game coordinator/defensive backs – Jason Simmons; Defensive assistant – Shawn Howe; Defensive assistant – Pat Reilly; Special teams coaches: Special teams coordinator – Danny Crossman; Support staff: Chief of staff – Steve Scarnecchia; Strength and conditioning: Head strength and conditioning – Mark Lovat; Assistant strength and conditioning – Justus Galac; Assistant strength and conditioning – Abe Munayer; Director of performance integration and sports science – Grant Thorne; → Coaching staff → Front office → More NFL staffs

== Current roster ==
Pittsburgh Steelers roster
Quarterbacks (QB): 16 Drew Allar; 18 Will Howard; 8 Aaron Rodgers; 2 Mason Rudolph; Running backs (RB): 13 Rico Dowdle; 29 Eli Heidenreich; 21 Travis Homer; 31 Lew Nichols III; 37 Riley Nowakowski FB; 30 Jaylen Warren; Wide receivers (WR): 17 Germie Bernard; 4 DK Metcalf; 15 Ben Skowronek; 10 Kaden Wetjen RS; 14 Roman Wilson; Tight ends (TE): 88 Pat Freiermuth; 85 Robert Tonyan; 80 Darnell Washington	Offensive linemen (OL): 74 Spencer Anderson G; 60 Dylan Cook T; 76 Troy Fautanu T; 54 Zach Frazier C; 67 Brock Hoffman G; 71 Max Iheanachor T; 62 Ryan McCollum C; Defensive linemen (DL): 95 Keeanu Benton DE; 94 Yahya Black NT; 99 Derrick Harmon DT; 97 Cameron Heyward DT; 92 Kevin Jobity Jr. DE; 96 Gabriel Rubio DE	Linebackers (LB): 44 Carson Bruener ILB; 57 KJ Henry OLB; 51 Nick Herbig OLB; 56 Alex Highsmith OLB; 55 Cole Holcomb ILB; 6 Patrick Queen ILB; 33 Jack Sawyer OLB; 90 T. J. Watt OLB; 41 Payton Wilson ILB; Defensive backs (DB): 3 Jaquan Brisker S; 35 Jamel Dean CB; 26 Brandin Echols CB; 25 DeShon Elliott S; 23 Daylen Everette CB; 27 Sean Murphy-Bunting CB; 5 Jalen Ramsey CB; 22 Asante Samuel Jr. CB; 40 Doneiko Slaughter CB; 28 Robert Spears-Jennings S; Special teams (ST): 9 Chris Boswell K; 19 Cameron Johnston P; 46 Christian Kuntz LS	Practice squad: 65 Kyler Baugh DT; 49 Sebastian Castro S; 20 AJ Finley S; 84 Max Hurleman WR; 89 Brandon Johnson WR; 79 Steven Jones G; 48 Marte Mapu LB; 81 Lake McRee TE; 72 Doug Nester G; 93 Esezi Otomewo DT; 50 Elandon Roberts LB; 38 Darius Rush CB; 83 Marquez Valdes-Scantling WR; 42 Car'lin Vigers CB; 45 Julius Welschof LB (IPP); 53 Jacoby Windmon LB; Reserve: 68 Jack Driscoll T (IR); 73 Gennings Dunker G (IR); 69 Sebastian Joseph-Day DT (IR); 34 Donte Kent CB (PUP); 91 Logan Lee DT (IR); 66 Mason McCormick G (IR); 11 Michael Pittman Jr. WR (IR) 53 active, 15 practice squad (1 IPP), 7 reserve As of November 22, 2026. Rookies in italics.; Roster; Depth chart; Transactions

== Preseason ==
Week	Date	Opponent	Result	Record	Venue	Recap
1	August 13	Green Bay Packers	W 28–9	1–0	Acrisure Stadium	Recap
2	August 21	New York Jets	L 0–17	1–1	Acrisure Stadium	Recap
3	August 27	at Buffalo Bills	L 27–28	1–2	Highmark Stadium	Recap

== Regular season ==
=== Schedule ===
Week	Date	Time (ET)	Opponent	Result	Record	Venue	TV	Recap
1	September 13	1:00 p.m.	Atlanta Falcons	**W** 20–13	1–0	Acrisure Stadium	Fox	Recap
2	September 20	1:00 p.m.	at New England Patriots	**L** 3–20	1–1	Gillette Stadium	CBS	Recap
3	September 27	1:00 p.m.	**Cincinnati Bengals**	**W** 30–27	2–1	Acrisure Stadium	CBS	Recap
4	October 1	8:15 p.m.	at **Cleveland Browns**	**L** 24–27	2–2	Huntington Bank Field	Prime Video	Recap
5	October 11	1:00 p.m.	Indianapolis Colts	**W** 34–22	3–2	Acrisure Stadium	CBS	Recap
6	October 18	1:00 p.m.	at Tampa Bay Buccaneers	**W** 26–19 (OT)	4–2	Raymond James Stadium	CBS	Recap
7	October 25	9:30 a.m.	at New Orleans Saints	**W** 16–10	5–2	Stade de France (Paris)	NFLN	Recap
8	November 1	1:00 p.m.	**Cleveland Browns**	**W** 27–6	6–2	Acrisure Stadium	CBS	Recap
9	Bye							
10	November 15	8:20 p.m.	at **Cincinnati Bengals**	**L** 18–38	6–3	Paycor Stadium	NBC	Recap
11	November 22	1:00 p.m.	at Philadelphia Eagles	**L** 16–19	6–4	Lincoln Financial Field	CBS	Recap
12	November 27	3:00 p.m.	Denver Broncos			Acrisure Stadium	Prime Video	
13	December 6	8:20 p.m.	Houston Texans			Acrisure Stadium	NBC	
14	December 14	8:25 p.m.	at Jacksonville Jaguars			EverBank Stadium	ESPN	
15	December 20	1:00 p.m.	**Baltimore Ravens**			Acrisure Stadium	CBS	
16	December 26/27	TBD	Carolina Panthers			Acrisure Stadium	TBD	
17	January 3	1:00 p.m.	at Tennessee Titans			Nissan Stadium	CBS	
18	January 9/10	TBD	at **Baltimore Ravens**			M&T Bank Stadium	TBD	

Notes

- Intra-division opponents are in **bold** text.
- Networks, dates and times from Weeks 13–17 are subject to change as a result of flexible scheduling.
- The date, time and network for Week 16 will be finalized by no later than the end of Week 14.
- The date, time and network for Week 18 will be finalized at the end of Week 17.

=== Game summaries ===
==== Week 1: vs. Atlanta Falcons ====
Week 1: Atlanta Falcons at Pittsburgh Steelers – Game summary

Quarter	1	2	3	4	Total
Falcons	7	0	3	3	**13**
**Steelers**	3	10	0	7	**20**

at Acrisure Stadium, Pittsburgh, Pennsylvania

- Date: September 13
- Game time: 1:00 p.m. EDT
- Game weather: Cloudy, 77 °F (25 °C)
- Game attendance: 66,089
- Referee: Brad Rogers
- TV announcers (Fox): Joe Davis, Greg Olsen and Pam Oliver
- Recap, Game Book

Game information

**First quarter**

- PIT – Chris Boswell 43-yard field goal, 8:30. Steelers 3–0. **Drive: 8 plays, 43 yards, 3:34.**
- ATL – Bijan Robinson 23-yard pass from Cooper Rush (Nick Folk kick), 1:13. Falcons 7–3. **Drive: 3 plays, 25 yards, 1:28.**

**Second quarter**

- PIT – Chris Boswell 28-yard field goal, 12:28. Falcons 7–6. **Drive: 8 plays, 61 yards, 3:45.**
- PIT – Pat Freiermuth 6-yard pass from Aaron Rodgers (Chris Boswell kick), 10:39. Steelers 13–7. **Drive: 4 plays, 31 yards, 1:27.**

**Third quarter**

- ATL – Nick Folk 51-yard field goal, 1:50. Steelers 13–10. **Drive: 5 plays, 23 yards, 2:51.**

**Fourth quarter**

- PIT – T. J. Watt 35-yard interception return (Chris Boswell kick), 14:05. Steelers 20–10.
- ATL – Nick Folk 43-yard field goal, 10:35. Steelers 20–13. **Drive: 6 plays, 42 yards, 3:30.**

**Top passers**

- ATL – Cooper Rush – 12/22, 143 yards, TD, 2 INT
- PIT – Aaron Rodgers – 24/40, 221 yards, TD

**Top rushers**

- ATL – Bijan Robinson – 21 rushes, 83 yards
- PIT – Jaylen Warren – 10 rushes, 46 yards

**Top receivers**

- ATL – Bijan Robinson – 8 receptions, 90 yards, TD
- PIT – Michael Pittman Jr. – 3 receptions, 58 yards

The Steelers went into halftime leading 13–7 before the Falcons tried to close the gap in the third with a field goal for that quarter's only score. They were able to move up double digits and eventually win by a touchdown.

This marked Pittsburgh's sixth straight win over Atlanta since 2010. Linebacker T. J. Watt also became the second NFL player after Julius Peppers to achieve at least 100 sacks and 10 interceptions in his career.

==== Week 2: at New England Patriots ====
Week 2: Pittsburgh Steelers at New England Patriots – Game summary

Quarter	1	2	3	4	Total
Steelers	0	3	0	0	**3**
**Patriots**	7	3	3	7	**20**

at Gillette Stadium, Foxborough, Massachusetts

- Date: September 20
- Game time: 1:00 p.m. EDT
- Game weather: Overcast, 63 °F (17 °C)
- Game attendance: 64,628
- Referee: Carl Cheffers
- TV announcers (CBS): Jim Nantz, J. J. Watt, and Tracy Wolfson
- Recap, Game Book

Game information

**First quarter**

- NE – TreVeyon Henderson 39-yard run (Andy Borregales kick), 8:22. Patriots 7–0. **Drive: 4 plays, 49 yards, 1:55.**

**Second quarter**

- NE – Andy Borregales 30-yard field goal, 14:14. Patriots 10–0. **Drive: 9 plays, 41 yards, 4:56.**
- PIT – Chris Boswell 56-yard field goal, 0:00. Patriots 10–3. **Drive: 6 plays, 27 yards, 0:40.**

**Third quarter**

- NE – Andy Borregales 45-yard field goal, 0:43. Patriots 13–3. **Drive: 5 plays, 65 yards, 1:29.**

**Fourth quarter**

- NE – Elijah Ponder 19-yard fumble return (Andy Borregales kick), 13:37. Patriots 20–3.

**Top passers**

- PIT – Aaron Rodgers – 23/39, 187 yards, INT
- NE – Drake Maye – 14/22, 208 yards, INT

**Top rushers**

- PIT – Jaylen Warren – 11 rushes, 43 yards
- NE – TreVeyon Henderson – 16 rushes, 76 yards, TD

**Top receivers**

- PIT – Germie Bernard – 4 receptions, 35 yards
- NE – Romeo Doubs – 3 receptions, 96 yards

With the loss, Aaron Rodgers finished his NFL career with a 4–4 record against the Patriots.

==== Week 3: vs. Cincinnati Bengals ====
Week 3: Cincinnati Bengals at Pittsburgh Steelers – Game summary

Quarter	1	2	3	4	Total
Bengals	7	10	3	7	**27**
**Steelers**	14	3	7	6	**30**

at Acrisure Stadium, Pittsburgh, Pennsylvania

- Date: September 27
- Game time: 1:00 p.m. EDT
- Game weather: Sunny, 70 °F (21 °C)
- Game attendance: 66,816
- Referee: Clay Martin
- TV announcers (CBS): Ian Eagle, Ross Tucker and Evan Washburn
- Recap, Game Book

Game information

**First quarter**

- PIT – Roman Wilson 38-yard pass from Aaron Rodgers (Chris Boswell kick), 13:10. Steelers 7–0. **Drive: 4 plays, 73 yards, 1:50.**
- CIN – Ja'Marr Chase 3-yard pass from Joe Burrow (Evan McPherson kick), 5:50. Tied 7–7. **Drive: 11 plays, 73 yards, 7:20.**
- PIT – Ben Skowronek 23-yard pass from Aaron Rodgers (Chris Boswell kick), 0:52. Steelers 14–7. **Drive: 11 plays, 86 yards, 4:58.**

**Second quarter**

- CIN – Evan McPherson 50-yard field goal, 10:16. Steelers 14–10. **Drive: 9 plays, 32 yards, 5:36.**
- PIT – Chris Boswell 44-yard field goal, 7:05. Steelers 17–10. **Drive: 6 plays, 40 yards, 3:11.**
- CIN – Tee Higgins 28-yard pass from Joe Burrow (Evan McPherson kick), 0:34. Tied 17–17. **Drive: 5 plays, 53 yards, 1:06.**

**Third quarter**

- CIN – Evan McPherson 38-yard field goal, 8:22. Bengals 20–17. **Drive: 12 plays, 65 yards, 6:38.**
- PIT – DK Metcalf 6-yard pass from Aaron Rodgers (Chris Boswell kick), 2:43. Steelers 24–20. **Drive: 11 plays, 74 yards, 5:39.**

**Fourth quarter**

- CIN – Mike Gesicki 25-yard pass from Joe Burrow (Evan McPherson kick), 13:29. Bengals 27–24. **Drive: 8 plays, 64 yards, 4:14.**
- PIT – Chris Boswell 36-yard field goal, 8:45. Tied 27–27. **Drive: 4 plays, -4 yards, 2:07.**
- PIT – Chris Boswell 33-yard field goal, 2:15. Steelers 30–27. **Drive: 8 plays, 77 yards, 5:24.**

**Top passers**

- CIN – Joe Burrow – 28/37, 282 yards, 3 TD
- PIT – Aaron Rodgers – 19/34, 292 yards, 3 TD, INT

**Top rushers**

- CIN – Chase Brown – 13 rushes, 61 yards
- PIT – Jaylen Warren – 17 rushes, 127 yards

**Top receivers**

- CIN – Ja'Marr Chase – 9 receptions, 98 yards, TD
- PIT – Darnell Washington – 3 receptions, 67 yards

After a tough loss, the Steelers then returned home for Game 1 against the Bengals. The Steelers struck first in the first quarter when Aaron Rodgers found Roman Wilson on a 38-yard touchdown pass. The Bengals then tied the game up when Joe Burrow found Ja'Marr Chase on a 3-yard touchdown pass. However, the Steelers retook the lead when Rodgers connected with Ben Skowronek on a 23-yard touchdown pass. In the second quarter, the Bengals came closer when Evan McPherson kicked a 50-yard field goal. Though, the Steelers pulled ahead by 7 again when Chris Boswell kicked a 44-yard field goal of his own. Joe Burrow then connected with Tee Higgins on a 28-yard touchdown pass, tying the game 17–17 at halftime. After the break, the Bengals moved into the lead in the third quarter when McPherson kicked a 38-yard field goal. However, the Steelers moved back into the lead with Rodgers connecting with DK Metcalf on a 6-yard touchdown pass. In the fourth quarter, the Bengals retook the lead again when Burrow found Mike Gesicki on a 25-yard touchdown pass. The Steelers moved just 11 yards on their next drive and were planning to get back on defense after a punt, but the Bengals muffed the punt, which saw Pittsburgh recover in the red zone to give them a short field that they utilized for a subsequent 36-yard field goal from Boswell. They then forced a three-and-out to get the ball back before going on a five-minute drive that culminated on a Boswell field goal from 33 yards out to give them the lead. With Cincinnati getting the ball back with two minutes left in the game, the Steelers' defense forced Joe Burrow to fumble the ball, which they recovered, sealing the win.

==== Week 4: at Cleveland Browns ====
Week 4: Pittsburgh Steelers at Cleveland Browns – Game summary

Quarter	1	2	3	4	Total
Steelers	7	3	0	14	**24**
**Browns**	0	21	0	6	**27**

at Huntington Bank Field, Cleveland, Ohio

- Date: October 1
- Game time: 8:15 p.m. EDT
- Game weather: Cloudy, 77 °F (25 °C)
- Game attendance: 68,156
- Referee: Clete Blakeman
- TV announcers (WTAE/Prime Video): Al Michaels, Kirk Herbstreit and Kaylee Hartung
- Recap, Game Book

Game information

**First quarter**

- PIT – Roman Wilson 12-yard pass from Aaron Rodgers (Chris Boswell kick), 2:59. Steelers 7–0. **Drive: 17 plays, 78 yards, 9:48.**

**Second quarter**

- CLE – Jaleel McLaughlin 28-yard run (Andre Szmyt kick), 12:14. Tied 7–7. **Drive: 4 plays, 56 yards, 1:57.**
- CLE – Quinshon Judkins 2-yard run (Andre Szmyt kick), 8:28. Browns 14–7. **Drive: 4 plays, 74 yards, 2:10.**
- CLE – Harold Fannin Jr. 2-yard pass from Deshaun Watson (Andre Szmyt kick), 1:22. Browns 21–7. **Drive: 11 plays, 62 yards, 3:59.**
- PIT – Chris Boswell 31-yard field goal, 0:08. Browns 21–10. **Drive: 6 plays, 59 yards, 1:14.**

**Third quarter**

- No scoring plays

**Fourth quarter**

- PIT – Darnell Washington 21-yard pass from Aaron Rodgers (pass failed), 10:10. Browns 21–16. **Drive: 6 plays, 77 yards, 4:01.**
- CLE – Andre Szmyt 44-yard field goal, 6:37. Browns 24–16. **Drive: 7 plays, 40 yards, 3:33.**
- PIT – Pat Freiermuth 3-yard pass from Aaron Rodgers (Aaron Rodgers run), 1:42. Tied 24–24. **Drive: 8 plays, 80 yards, 1:50.**
- CLE – Andre Szmyt 56-yard field goal, 0:10. Browns 27–24. **Drive: 7 plays, 36 yards, 1:32.**

**Top passers**

- PIT – Aaron Rodgers – 22/40, 299 yards, 3 TD, 2 INT
- CLE – Deshaun Watson – 24/33, 268 yards, TD, INT

**Top rushers**

- PIT – Jaylen Warren – 17 rushes, 93 yards
- CLE – Quinshon Judkins – 17 rushes, 53 yards, TD

**Top receivers**

- PIT – DK Metcalf – 5 receptions, 115 yards
- CLE – Denzel Boston – 4 receptions, 89 yards

After a tough win at home, the Steelers faced the Browns on the road as 2-point favorites. They took an early lead after Aaron Rodgers threw a 12-yard touchdown pass to Roman Wilson. However, the Browns scored three consecutive touchdowns in the second quarter: runs from Jaleel McLaughlin and Quinshon Judkins and a DeShaun Watson pass to Harold Fannin Jr.. Kicker Chris Boswell converted a 31-yard field goal to reduce the deficit to 11 at halftime. After a scoreless third quarter, Rodgers threw a touchdown pass Darnell Washington to further reduce the deficit to five. The Steelers tied the game 24–24 when Rodgers connected with Pat Freiermuth but the Browns then regained the lead when Andre Szmyt converted a second field goal. With seconds left, Rodgers attempted a Hail Mary pass but ended up throwing an interception that sealed the loss.

With their fifth straight road loss to the Browns since 2022, the Steelers fell to 2–2. They also fell to 0–10 to AFC North rivals on Thursday Night Football when playing them on the road.

==== Week 5: vs. Indianapolis Colts ====
Week 5: Indianapolis Colts at Pittsburgh Steelers – Game summary

Quarter	1	2	3	4	Total
Colts	6	7	6	3	**22**
**Steelers**	7	10	7	10	**34**

at Acrisure Stadium, Pittsburgh, Pennsylvania

- Date: October 11
- Game time: 1:00 p.m. EDT
- Game weather: Rain, 62 °F (17 °C)
- Game attendance: 66,503
- Referee: Shawn Smith
- TV announcers (CBS): Jim Nantz, JJ Watt, and Tracy Wolfson
- Recap, Game Book

Game information

**First quarter**

- IND – Spencer Shrader 57-yard field goal, 8:57. Colts 3–0. **Drive: 7 plays, 22 yards, 3:24.**
- PIT – Jaylen Warren 80-yard pass from Aaron Rodgers (Chris Boswell kick), 8:45. Steelers 7–3. **Drive: 1 play, 80 yards, 0:12.**
- IND – Spencer Shrader 56-yard field goal, 6:55. Steelers 7–6. **Drive: 4 plays, 5 yards, 1:50.**

**Second quarter**

- PIT – Pat Freiermuth 1-yard pass from Aaron Rodgers (Chris Boswell kick), 13:17. Steelers 14–6. **Drive: 12 plays, 80 yards, 8:38.**
- IND – Tyler Warren 1-yard run (Spencer Shrader kick), 7:43. Steelers 14–13. **Drive: 11 plays, 71 yards, 5:34.**
- PIT – Chris Boswell 48-yard field goal, 0:21. Steelers 17–13. **Drive: 11 plays, 58 yards, 2:21.**

**Third quarter**

- IND – Spencer Shrader 22-yard field goal, 10:23. Steelers 17–16. **Drive: 9 plays, 56 yards, 4:37.**
- PIT – Jaylen Warren 50-yard run (Chris Boswell kick), 7:06. Steelers 24–16. **Drive: 5 plays, 60 yards, 3:17.**
- IND – Spencer Shrader 40-yard field goal, 2:13. Steelers 24–19. **Drive: 10 plays, 45 yards, 4:53.**

**Fourth quarter**

- IND – Spencer Shrader 28-yard field goal, 11:42. Steelers 24–22. **Drive: 12 plays, 51 yards, 4:29.**
- PIT – Pat Freiermuth 17-yard pass from Aaron Rodgers (Chris Boswell kick), 6:35. Steelers 31–22. **Drive: 10 plays, 64 yards, 5:07.**
- PIT – Chris Boswell 54-yard field goal, 3:43. Steelers 34–22. **Drive: 4 plays, 3 yards, 0:29.**

**Top passers**

- IND – Daniel Jones – 24/44, 267 yards
- PIT – Aaron Rodgers – 22/31, 235 yards, 3 TD

**Top rushers**

- IND – Jonathan Taylor – 15 rushes, 45 yards
- PIT – Jaylen Warren – 15 rushes, 101 yards, TD

**Top receivers**

- IND – Tyler Warren – 7 receptions, 83 yards
- PIT – Jaylen Warren – 6 receptions, 87 yards, TD

After a tough road loss, the Steelers returned home for a game against the Colts. In the first quarter, the Colts would lead for the only time all game when kicker Spencer Shrader nailed a 57-yard field goal. The Steelers then took the lead when Jaylen Warren got an 8-yard touchdown pass from Aaron Rodgers. The Colts, however came within a point when Shrader kicked a 56-yard field goal. The Steelers then went back to work in the second quarter when Rodgers found Pat Freiermuth on a 1-yard touchdown pass. Tyler Warren got the Colts closer again with a 1-yard touchdown run, but not before the Steelers pulled away when Chris Boswell kicked a 48-yard field goal to give his team a 17–13 lead at halftime. In the third quarter, Shrader kicked a 22-yard field goal to get his team within a point yet again. But the Steelers were able to pull away when Warren ran for a 50-yard touchdown. Schrader closed the quarter getting his team within 5 points on a 40-yard field goal. In the fourth quarter, he got his team even closer when he kicked a 28-yard field goal. However, the small deficit was short-lived as the Steelers were able to seal the game with 2 scores: Freiermuth catching a 17-yard touchdown pass from Rodgers, followed by Boswell kicking a 54-yard field goal.

==== Week 6: at Tampa Bay Buccaneers ====
Week 6: Pittsburgh Steelers at Tampa Bay Buccaneers – Game summary

Quarter	1	2	3	4	OT	Total
**Steelers**	0	3	0	16	7	**26**
Buccaneers	3	10	3	3	0	**19**

at Raymond James Stadium, Tampa, Florida

- Date: October 18
- Game time: 1:00 p.m. EDT
- Game weather: Clear, 77 °F (25 °C)
- Game attendance: 64,660
- Referee: Land Clark
- TV announcers (CBS): Andrew Catalon, Logan Ryan and AJ Ross
- Recap, Game Book

Game information

**First quarter**

- TB – Chase McLaughlin 43-yard field goal, 7:51. Buccaneers 3–0. **Drive: 6 plays, 14 yards, 2:54.**

**Second quarter**

- TB – Emeka Egbuka 2-yard pass from Jalon Daniels (Chase McLaughlin kick), 14:52. Buccaneers 10–0. **Drive: 8 plays 60 yards, 3:49.**
- TB – Chase McLaughlin 47-yard field goal, 4:08. Buccaneers 13–0. **Drive: 7 plays, 33 yards, 3:03.**
- PIT – Chris Boswell 52-yard field goal, 0:00. Buccaneers 13–3. **Drive: 9 plays, 43 yards, 1:28.**

**Third quarter**

- TB – Chase McLaughlin 33-yard field goal, 5:02. Buccaneers 16–3. **Drive: 17 plays, 70 yards, 9:02.**

**Fourth quarter**

- PIT – Darnell Washington 5-yard pass from Aaron Rodgers (Chris Boswell kick), 13:48. Buccaneers 16–10. **Drive: 8 plays 68 yards, 3:26.**
- PIT – Chris Boswell 39-yard field goal, 8:08. Buccaneers 16–13. **Drive: 8 plays, 24 yards, 5:01.**
- PIT – Chris Boswell 58-yard field goal, 1:55. Tied 16–16. **Drive: 9 plays, 37 yards, 5:08.**
- PIT – Chris Boswell 2-yard field goal, 1:21. Steelers 19–16. **Drive: 4 plays, 2 yards, 0:17.**
- TB – Chase McLauglin 53-yard field goal, 0:08. 'Tied 19–19. **Drive: 5 plays, 30 yards, 1:13.**

**Overtime**

- PIT – Germie Bernard 6-yard pass from Aaron Rodgers (Chris Boswell kick), 3:15. 'Steelers 26–19. **Drive: 12 plays, 70 yards, 6:45.**

**Top passers**

- PIT – Aaron Rodgers – 33/49, 253 yards, 2 TD, INT
- TB – Jalon Daniels – 22/43, 164 yards, TD, 2 INT

**Top rushers**

- PIT – Jaylen Warren – 14 rushes, 50 yards
- TB – Bucky Irving – 19 rushes, 46 yards

**Top receivers**

- PIT – DK Metcalf – 11 receptions, 93 yards
- TB – Emeka Egbuka – 7 receptions, 48 yards, TD

The Steelers played poorly in the first half, falling behind 13–0 before only scoring a field goal before halftime. However in the second half, they clawed back after trailing by 13 again, heading into the fourth quarter in which they scored 16 points to take a 19–16 lead and thanks to interceptions from Daylen Everette and Jamel Dean. However, the Buccaneers were able to tie the game up later on at 19–19 when Chase McLaughin scored a 53-yard field goal. In overtime, rookie Germie Bernard put Pittsburgh in the lead and the Steelers sealed the win after Jalen Ramsey sacked Jalon Daniels on fourth down.

==== Week 7: at New Orleans Saints ====
NFL Paris games

Week 7: Pittsburgh Steelers at New Orleans Saints – Game summary

Quarter	1	2	3	4	Total
**Steelers**	3	10	3	0	**16**
Saints	0	10	0	0	**10**

at Stade de France, Paris, France

- Date: October 25
- Game time: 2:30 p.m. CET/9:30 a.m. EDT
- Game weather: Partly cloudy, 59 °F (15 °C) (fixed roof)
- Game attendance: 78,488
- Referee: Bill Vinovich
- TV announcers (WTAE/NFLN): Dave Pasch, Kurt Warner, Jason Kelce and Molly McGrath
- Recap, Game Book

Game information

**First quarter**

- PIT – Chris Boswell 28-yard field goal, 10:51. Steelers 3–0. **Drive: 8 plays, 51 yards, 4:09.**

**Second quarter**

- NO – Daniel Carlson 38-yard field goal, 10:17. Tied 3–3. **Drive: 7 plays, 62 yards, 3:00.**
- PIT – Darnell Washington 4-yard pass from Aaron Rodgers (Chris Boswell kick), 6:45. Steelers 10–3. **Drive: 6 plays, 77 yards, 3:32.**
- NO – Devaughn Vele 1-yard pass from Tyler Shough (Daniel Carlson kick), 1:45. Tied 10–10. **Drive: 12 plays, 52 yards, 5:00.**
- PIT – Chris Boswell 47-yard field goal, 0:00. Steelers 13–10. **Drive: 11 plays, 40 yards, 1:45.**

**Third quarter**

- PIT – Chris Boswell 39-yard field goal, 0:14. Steelers 16–10. **Drive: 14 plays, 51 yards, 7:18.**

**Fourth quarter**

- No scoring plays

**Top passers**

- PIT – Aaron Rodgers – 19/30, 212 yards, TD
- NO – Tyler Shough – 30/38, 278 yards, TD, INT

**Top rushers**

- PIT – Jaylen Warren – 18 rushes, 101 yards
- NO – Tyler Shough – 3 rushes, 7 yards

**Top receivers**

- PIT – DK Metcalf – 2 receptions, 56 yards
- NO – Alvin Kamara – 7 receptions, 57 yards

This was the first-ever NFL game in France. In the first half, the teams exchanged field goals and touchdowns, resulting in a 10–10 at halftime. In the second half, the Steelers scored the only points on a pair of Chris Boswell field goals, holding on for the 16–10 win.

==== Week 8: vs. Cleveland Browns ====
Week 8: Cleveland Browns at Pittsburgh Steelers – Game summary

Quarter	1	2	3	4	Total
Browns	0	6	0	0	**6**
**Steelers**	7	13	7	0	**27**

at Acrisure Stadium, Pittsburgh, Pennsylvania

- Date: November 1
- Game time: 1:00 p.m. EST
- Game weather: Cloudy, 66 °F (19 °C)
- Game attendance: 66,986
- Referee: Alex Kemp
- TV announcers (CBS): Kevin Harlan, Trent Green and Melanie Collins
- Recap, Game Book

Game information

**First quarter**

- PIT – Rico Dowdle 9-yard run (Chris Boswell kick), 7:57. Steelers 7–0. **Drive: 5 plays, 45 yards, 2:37.**

**Second quarter**

- PIT – Chris Boswell 20-yard field goal, 14:05. Steelers 10–0. **Drive: 13 plays, 86 yards, 7:12.**
- CLE – Andre Szmyt 32-yard field goal, 8:43. Steelers 10–3. **Drive: 10 plays, 61 yards, 5:22.**
- PIT – Chris Boswell 37-yard field goal, 3:27. Steelers 13–3. **Drive: 10 plays, 45 yards, 5:16.**
- CLE – Andre Szmyt 49-yard field goal, 0:45. Steelers 13–6. **Drive: 8 plays, 44 yards, 2:42.**
- PIT – Pat Freiermuth 1-yard run (Chris Boswell kick), 0:01. Steelers 20–6. **Drive: 6 plays, 69 yards, 0:44.**

**Third quarter**

- PIT – Jaylen Warren 1-yard run (Chris Boswell kick), 9:39. Steelers 27–6. **Drive: 2 plays, 59 yards, 0:44.**

**Fourth quarter**

- No scoring plays

**Top passers**

- CLE – Deshaun Watson – 27/39, 324 yards
- PIT – Aaron Rodgers – 13/25, 172 yards, INT

**Top rushers**

- CLE – Quinshon Judkins – 11 rushes, 25 yards
- PIT – Jaylen Warren – 17 rushes, 143 yards, TD

**Top receivers**

- CLE – Harold Fannin Jr. – 10 receptions, 154 yards
- PIT – Darnell Washington – 3 receptions, 94 yards

The Steelers dominated the Browns in this game 27–6. In the second quarter, linebacker T. J. Watt achieved a record-breaking total of 19.5 sacks against the Browns throughout his entire career, making it the most by any player against the Browns in NFL history.

==== Week 10: at Cincinnati Bengals ====
Week 10: Pittsburgh Steelers at Cincinnati Bengals – Game summary

Quarter	1	2	3	4	Total
Steelers	0	3	0	15	**18**
**Bengals**	3	21	7	7	**38**

at Paycor Stadium, Cincinnati, Ohio

- Date: November 15
- Game time: 8:20 p.m. EST
- Game weather: Partly clear, 42 °F (6 °C)
- Game attendance: 66,860
- Referee: Don Willard (Note: Originally Clete Blakeman but changed due to FAA groundings.)
- TV announcers (NBC): Mike Tirico, Cris Collinsworth and Melissa Stark
- Recap, Game Book

Game information

**First quarter**

- CIN – Evan McPherson 24-yard field goal, 8:56. Bengals 3–0. **Drive: 13 plays, 80 yards, 6:04.**

**Second quarter**

- CIN – Drew Sample 3-yard pass from Joe Burrow (Evan McPherson kick), 14:47. Bengals 10–0. **Drive: 13 plays, 92 yards, 2:54.**
- CIN – Chase Brown 2-yard pass from Joe Burrow (Evan McPherson kick), 5:28. Bengals 17–0. **Drive: 5 plays, 80 yards, 8:09.**
- PIT – Chris Boswell 45-yard field goal, 1:25. Bengals 17–3. **Drive: 10 plays, 42 yards, 4:03.**
- CIN – Dohnte Meyers 15-yard pass from Joe Burrow (Evan McPherson kick), 0:09. Bengals 24–3. **Drive: 8 plays, 57 yards, 1:16.**

**Third quarter**

- CIN – Chase Brown 4-yard pass from Joe Burrow (Evan McPherson kick), 4:12. Bengals 31–3. **Drive: 11 plays, 78 yards, 6:34.**

**Fourth quarter**

- PIT – DK Metcalf 22-yard pass from Aaron Rodgers (Aaron Rodgers-DK Metcalf pass), 12:16. Bengals 31–11. **Drive: 10 plays, 84 yards, 3:05.**
- CIN – Samaje Perine 1-yard run (Evan McPherson kick), 10:08. Bengals 38–11. **Drive: 4 plays, 49 yards, 2:08.**
- PIT – Pat Freiermuth 27-yard pass from Aaron Rodgers (Chris Boswell kick), 7:19. Bengals 38–18. **Drive: 6 plays, 66 yards, 2:49.**

**Top passers**

- PIT – Aaron Rodgers – 15/29, 143 yards, 2 TD
- CIN – Joe Burrow – 35/44, 409 yards, 4 TD

**Top rushers**

- PIT – Lew Nichols III – 6 rushes, 43 yards
- CIN – Chase Brown – 10 rushes, 44 yards

**Top receivers**

- PIT – DK Metcalf – 2 receptions, 54 yards, TD
- CIN – Ja'Marr Chase – 11 receptions, 231 yards

Aaron Rodgers failed to complete a single pass until his eighth attempt with four minutes left in the second quarter. Pittsburgh's defense was ineffective against Joe Burrow, who dominated through the air, leading to a 38–18 collapse. The Steelers once again failed to win in Cincinnati. Additionally, this was the first time since 2016 in which they lost a game that came directly after their bye week.

==== Week 11: at Philadelphia Eagles ====
Week 11: Pittsburgh Steelers at Philadelphia Eagles – Game summary

Quarter	1	2	3	4	Total
Steelers	0	3	6	7	**16**
**Eagles**	13	0	3	3	**19**

at Lincoln Financial Field, Philadelphia, Pennsylvania

- Date: November 22
- Game time: 1:00 p.m. EST
- Game weather: Cloudy, 63 °F (17 °C)
- Game attendance: 69,879
- Referee: Land Clark
- TV announcers (CBS): Kevin Harlan, Trent Green and Melanie Collins
- Recap, Game Book

Game information

**First quarter**

- PHI – Jake Elliott 41-yard field goal, 10:01. Eagles 3–0. **Drive: 5 plays, 17 yards, 2:39.**
- PHI – Jake Elliott 29-yard field goal, 2:57. Eagles 6–0. **Drive: 9 plays, 58 yards, 4:53.**
- PHI – Saquon Barkley 38-yard rush (Jake Elliott kick), 0:35. Eagles 13–0. **Drive: 2 plays, 48 yards, 0:44.**

**Second quarter**

- PIT – Chris Boswell 25-yard field goal, 1:01. Eagles 13–3. **Drive: 17 plays, 77 yards, 8:22.**

**Third quarter**

- PIT – Chris Boswell 40-yard field goal, 13:55. Eagles 13–6. **Drive: 4 plays, 2 yards, 0:57.**
- PHI – Jake Elliott 53-yard field goal, 8:33. Eagles 16–6. **Drive: 6 plays, 20 yards, 2:32.**
- PIT – Chris Boswell 52-yard field goal, 4:48. Eagles 16–9. **Drive: 9 plays, 30 yards, 3:45.**

**Fourth quarter**

- PHI – Jake Elliott 55-yard field goal, 4:19. Eagles 19–9. **Drive: 9 plays, 34 yards, 4:20.**
- PIT – Max Hurleman 20-yard pass from Aaron Rodgers (Chris Boswell kick), 1:21. Eagles 19–16. **Drive: 13 plays, 72 yards, 2:58.**

**Top passers**

- PIT – Aaron Rodgers – 30/44, 227 yards, TD
- PHI – Joe Milton – 11/21, 141 yards

**Top rushers**

- PIT – Aaron Rodgers – 5 rushes, 29 yards
- PHI – Saquon Barkley – 17 rushes, 75 yards, TD

**Top receivers**

- PIT – Max Hurleman – 6 receptions, 61 yards, TD
- PHI – Darius Cooper – 4 receptions, 59 yards

==== Week 12: vs. Denver Broncos ====
Black Friday Games

Week 12: Denver Broncos at Pittsburgh Steelers – Game summary

Quarter	1	2	3	4	Total
Broncos	0	0	0	0	**0**
Steelers	0	0	0	0	**0**

at Acrisure Stadium, Pittsburgh, Pennsylvania

- Date: November 27
- Game time: 3:00 p.m. EST
- TV announcers (WTAE/Prime Video): Al Michaels, Kirk Herbstreit and Kaylee Hartung
- Preview

=== Standings ===
==== Division ====
AFC North
	W	L	T	PCT	DIV	CONF	PF	PA	STK
Cincinnati Bengals	7	2	0	.778	2–1	5–2	278	193	W5
Cleveland Browns	6	4	0	.600	2–1	4–3	188	220	W1
Pittsburgh Steelers	6	4	0	.600	2–2	3–3	214	201	L2
Baltimore Ravens	4	7	0	.364	0–2	2–5	242	294	L6

==== Conference ====
AFC
Seed	Team	Division	W	L	T	PCT	DIV	CONF	SOS	SOV	STK
**Division leaders**
1	Buffalo Bills	East	9	1	0	.900	2–1	6–1	.424	.416	W6
2	Kansas City Chiefs	West	8	2	0	.800	3–1	6–1	.374	.300	W3
3 (Note: Jacksonville wins tie break over Cincinnati based on head-to-head victory.)	Jacksonville Jaguars	South	7	2	0	.778	2–1	6–2	.444	.408	W3
4	Cincinnati Bengals	North	7	2	0	.778	2–1	5–2	.389	.310	W5
**Wild cards**
5	Denver Broncos	West	7	2	0	.778	2–1	3–1	.591	.522	W5
6 (Note: Cleveland wins tie break over Pittsburgh based on division record.)	Cleveland Browns	North	6	4	0	.600	2–1	4–3	.410	.377	W1
7	Pittsburgh Steelers	North	6	4	0	.600	2–2	3–3	.465	.417	L2
**In the hunt**
8	New England Patriots	East	5	5	0	.500	3–0	5–1	.576	.440	L2
9 (Note: Houston wins tie break over Las Vegas based on strength of victory.)	Houston Texans	South	4	6	0	.400	3–1	4–4	.480	.308	W1
10	Las Vegas Raiders	West	4	6	0	.400	1–1	3–3	.500	.179	L2
11	Baltimore Ravens	North	4	7	0	.364	0–2	2–5	.459	.286	L6
12	Indianapolis Colts	South	3	8	0	.273	1–3	2–6	.463	.293	L1
13	New York Jets	East	2	8	0	.200	0–3	2–5	.560	.350	L5
14	Los Angeles Chargers	West	1	8	0	.111	0–3	1–5	.560	.364	W1
15 (Note: Tennessee wins tie break over Miami based on strength of victory.)	Tennessee Titans	South	1	9	0	.100	1–2	1–6	.465	.273	L4
16	Miami Dolphins	East	1	9	0	.100	1–2	1–6	.622	.200	L4
