= Greg Gigantino =

American football coach (born c. 1955)

Current position
- Title: Defensive coordinator
- Team: Massachusetts Maritime
- Conference: MASCAC

Biographical details
- Born: c. 1955 (age 70–71); Edison, New Jersey, U.S.
- Education: Wagner College (1977)

Playing career
- 1973–1976: Wagner
- Position: Linebacker

Coaching career (HC unless noted)
- 1977: IUP (WR)
- 1978–1979: Rutgers (GA)
- 1980: Rutgers (C)
- 1981–1983: Rutgers (DL)
- 1984: Iona
- 1985: Davidson (ST/DL)
- 1986–1987: Davidson (ST/ILB)
- 1988: Davidson (ST/DL)
- 1989: Lehigh (LB)
- 1990–1995: Hofstra (DC)
- 1996–1997: Hofstra (AHC/DC)
- 1998: Cornell (DC/LB)
- 1999–2000: Cornell (AHC/DC/LB)
- 2001 (spring): Hofstra (DB)
- 2001: Hofstra (DC)
- 2002–2005: Hofstra (AHC/DC)
- 2006: Bryant (LB)
- 2007–2016: Bryant (DC/LB)
- 2017–2018: Mater Dei HS (NJ) (LB)
- 2019–2023: Bethany (WV) (DL)
- 2024–present: Massachusetts Maritime (DC)

Head coaching record
- Overall: 2–8

Greg Gigantino (born c. 1955) is an American college football coach. He is the defensive coordinator for Massachusetts Maritime Academy, a position he has held since 2024. He was the head football coach for Iona College—now known as Iona University—in 1984. He also coached for IUP, Rutgers, Davidson, Lehigh, Hofstra, Cornell, Bryant, Mater Dei High School, and Bethany (WV). He played college football for Wagner as a linebacker.

== Playing career ==
Gigantino grew up in Edison, New Jersey. He attended and played high school football for J. P. Stevens High School alongside his older brother Art. Upon his high school graduation he attended Wagner. He played linebacker for the Seahawks football team.

Gigantino graduated from Wagner in 1977.

== Coaching career ==
In 1977, following Gigantino's graduation he was named the wide receivers coach for IUP under head coach Bill Neal. He also helped coach the offense on the freshmen team.

In 1978, Gigantino joined Rutgers as a part-time graduate assistant coach under head coach Frank R. Burns. In his first year he worked with the wide receivers and tight ends before working with the defensive ends and outside linebackers in 1979. In 1980, Burns hired Gigantino as a full-time coach in charge of the centers and assisted in recruiting, specifically in Central Jersey. After one seasons his role expanded further and he was named defensive line coach. He was fired alongside Burns after finishing the 1983 with a 3–8 record.

In 1984, Gigantino was named the head football coach for Iona. He was the successor to Brian Colleary who resigned following the 1983 season. He finished the 1984 season with a record of 2–8 as the Gaels competed as an NCAA Division III independent. The team's two wins came against Marist, 21–0, and at Pace, 34–14. The team's worst loss game against Norwich at home in the eighth week of the season as they lost 13–62. On the year they were outscored 193 to 362. He resigned after only one season as head coach following the 1984 season.

In 1985, Gigantino was named as the special teams coordinator and defensive line coach for Davidson under first-year head coach Vic Gatto. In 1986, he retained his role as special teams coordinator but moved to coaching the inside linebackers. 1988, he returned to his original roles; restoring his position as defensive line coach.

In 1989, Gigantino was named the linebackers coach for Lehigh under head coach Hank Small. He also served as the academic coordinator. He resigned following only one season.

After just one season with Lehigh, Gigantino was named the defensive coordinator for Hofstra under first-year head coach Joe Gardi. In his first season as defensive coordinator he helped lead the Flying Dutchmen to a 12–1 record and a trip to the NCAA Division III semifinal. In 1996, Gigantino was promoted to assistant head coach. He helped lead the defense to only allow 12.5 points per game, which was good enough for sixth in the nation that same year. He was crucial in the recruitment of quarterback Giovanni Carmazzi who went on to be drafted into the National Football League (NFL). In his last season he was a part of the 9–3 team that made the NCAA Division I-AA playoffs. He resigned following the 1997 season.

In 1998, Gigantino was named defensive coordinator and linebackers coach for Cornell under first-year head coach Pete Mangurian. He joined Cornell in hopes to help him pursue his goal of coaching in the NFL despite being deemed a lateral move. He wanted to work under head coach Mangurian because of Mangurian's ties to the NFL as he worked under Dan Reeves for the Denver Broncos, New York Giants, and Atlanta Falcons. After one season he was promoted and added the title of assistant head coach alongside his other positions. In his first season with his new role he helped lead the team to a 7–3 record which was their best season since 1992. He was fired following the 2000 season.

In 2001, Gigantino returned to Hofstra, again under Joe Gardi. He was initially hired as the defensive backs coach, but defensive coordinator Dan Quinn took a job with the San Francisco 49ers before the start of the season. With Quinn's departure, Gigantino was named defensive coordinator for his second stint. After one season he added the title of associate head coach in 2002. During the 2002 season, while head coach Gardi was on the disabled list, Gigantino served as the acting head coach and led the Pride to two victories. Gardi and Gigantino's last season at Hofstra was in 2005 and concluded with a 7–4 record.

In 2006, Gigantino was hired as the linebackers coach for Bryant under head coach Marty Fine. In 2007, he was promoted to defensive coordinator alongside retaining his previous responsibility. In his first two season in 2006 and 2007 he helped lead the team to back-to-back Northeast-10 Conference (NE-10) titles and back-to-back NCAA Division II playoffs. He was fired following the 2016 season.

In 2016, Gigantino took his first high school coaching role as the linebackers coach for Mater Dei High School. He held the position until 2018.

In 2019, Gigantino returned to college coaching and was named defensive line coach for Bethany (WV) under head coach Bill Garvey. He was retained in 2022 after Garvey was fired and Brandon Robinson was named the new head coach.

In 2024, Gigantino accepted his fifth stint as a defensive coordinator, this time for Massachusetts Maritime under head coach Jeremy Cameron.

== Head coaching record ==
Year	Team	Overall	Conference	Standing	Bowl/playoffs
Iona Gaels (NCAA Division III independent) (1984)
1984	Iona	2–8			
Iona:		2–8			
Total:		2–8			
