= Donnybrook, Dublin =

Inner suburb of Dublin, Ireland

Donnybrook Domhnach Broc
- Urban district
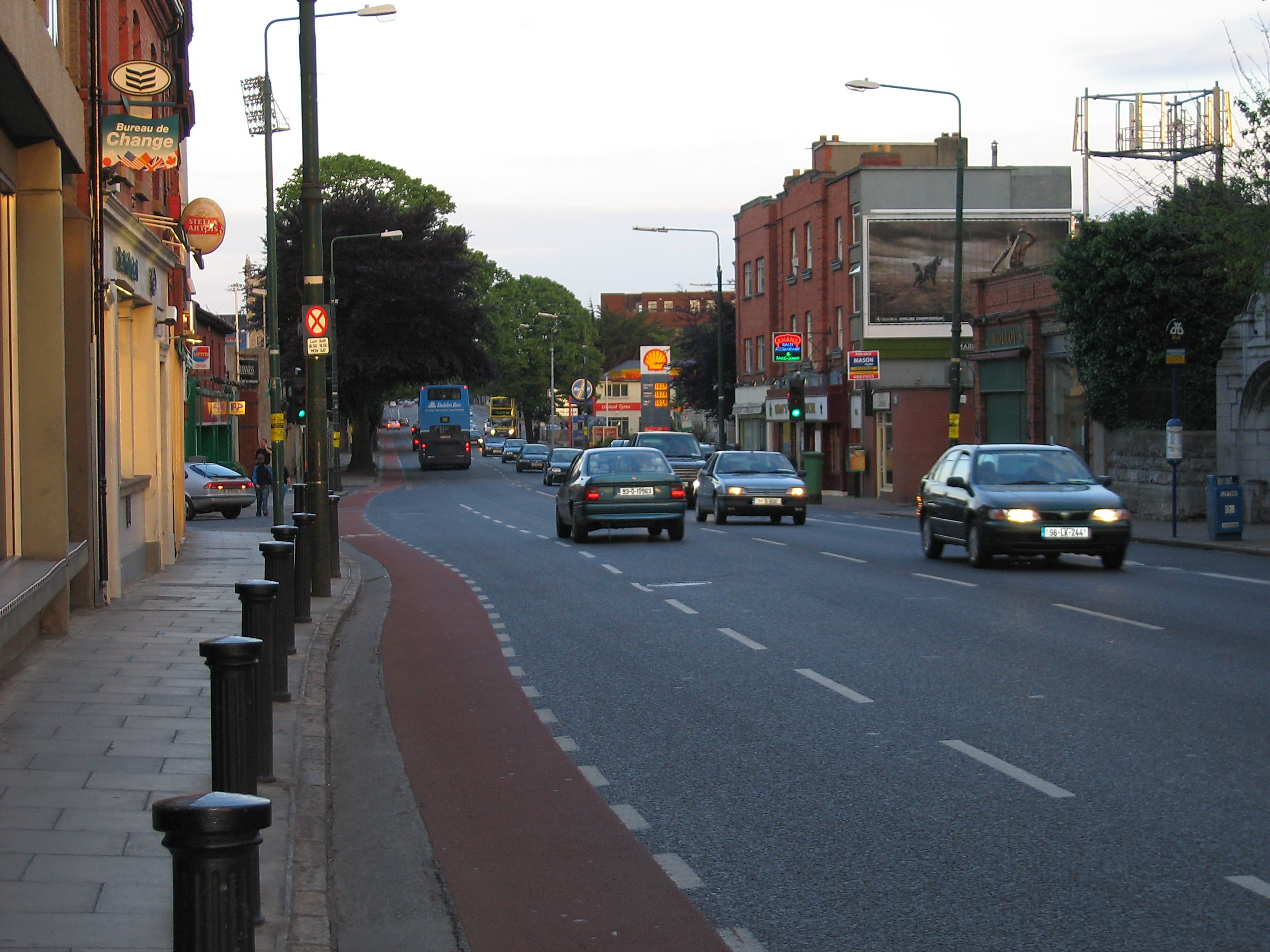
- Donnybrook Road, looking towards Stillorgan

- Location in Ireland
- Coordinates: 53.324°N 6.240°W
- Country: Ireland
- Province: Leinster
- County: Dublin
- Dáil Éireann: Dublin Bay South
- European Parliament: Dublin
- Elevation: 11 m (36 ft)
- Eircode routing key: D04
- Area code: 01 (+3531)
- Irish Grid Reference: O169318
- Website: donnybrooktidytowns.ie

Donnybrook (Irish: Domhnach Broc, meaning 'church of Saint Broc') is an urban district of Dublin, Ireland, on the southside of the city, in the Dublin 4 postal district. It is home to the Irish public service broadcaster RTÉ and was once part of the Pembroke Township. Its neighbouring suburbs are Ballsbridge, Sandymount, Ranelagh and Clonskeagh.

Donnybrook is also a civil parish mainly situated in the old barony of Dublin.

== History ==
Donnybrook Fair dates from a charter of John, King of England in 1204 and was held annually until 1855. It began as a fair for livestock and agricultural produce but later declined, growing into more of a carnival and funfair. Drunkenness, fighting, and hasty marriages became commonplace and the people of Donnybrook were anxious that it should cease. Eventually, the fair's reputation for tumult was its undoing. From the 1790s on, there were campaigns against the drunken brawl the fair had become. After a good deal of local fundraising, the patent was bought by a group of prominent residents and clergy, bringing about its demise. The Fair took place on lands now occupied by Donnybrook Rugby Ground and the Ever Ready Garage. The word donnybrook has since entered the English language to describe a rowdy brawl.

=== Donnybrook castle ===
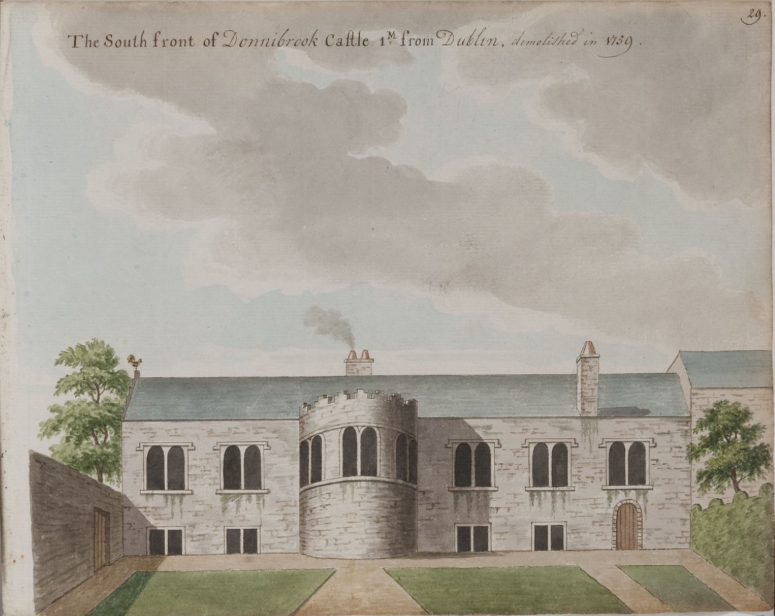
Illustration of Donnybrook Castle from the 18th century

Donnybrook Castle was an Elizabethan mansion and residence of the Ussher family. James Ussher was appointed Archbishop of Armagh in the Church of Ireland by Queen Elizabeth I. The mansion was demolished in 1759 and later replaced in 1795 by the existing Georgian house. It is now occupied by the Religious Sisters of Charity.

=== Churches and cemetery ===
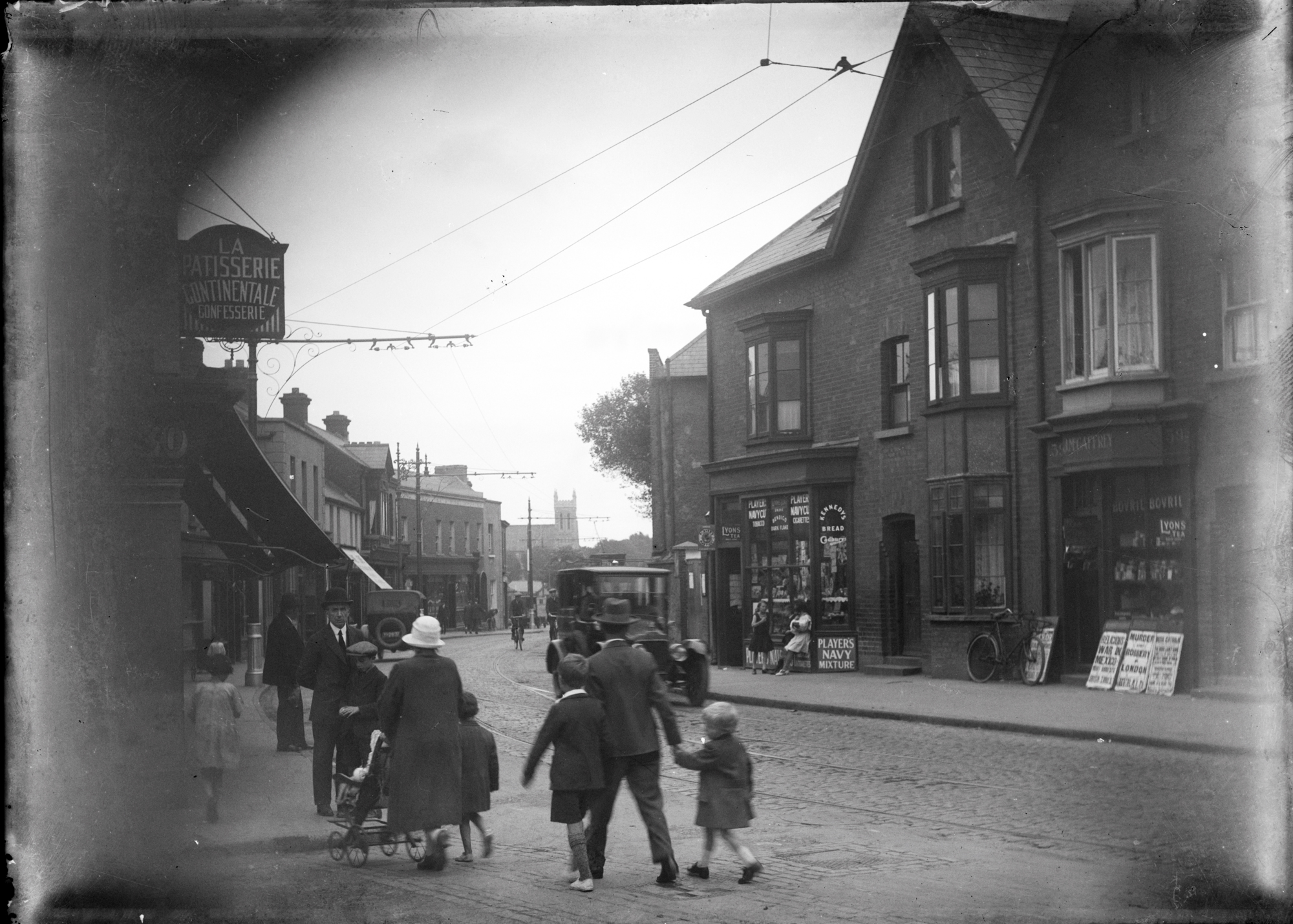
Donnybrook Road in 1927, with the tower of Donnybrook church visible in the distance

Donnybrook Cemetery dates back to the 8th century and was once the location of a church founded by St Broc. It was also the site of Catholic and Church of Ireland churches, both called St Mary's. Those buried in it include Dr Bartholomew Mosse, the founder of the Rotunda Hospital, Sir Edward Lovett Pearce, architect of the Irish Houses of Parliament on College Green and Dr Richard Madden, biographer of the United Irishmen. It is possible that the wall on the south side of the cemetery is the oldest man-made structure still existing in Donnybrook. The brick chimney behind the cemetery was built on the site of a former marble works and later served as a Magdalene laundry. Two ancestors of Meghan Markle, Mary McCue and Thomas Bird, an English soldier, were married at St Mary's Church of Ireland church, Donnybrook, in 1860.

Today, two churches are located in the area, the Catholic Church of the Sacred Heart, Donnybrook is still open and active while the protestant St. Mary's Church, Donnybrook is now closed and was purchased by the Royal Dublin Society and forms part of its campus.

== Geography ==
The river Dodder runs through Donnybrook and at one time there was a ford here. It is subject to periodic serious flooding and in 1628 one of the Usshers of Donnybrook Castle drowned while trying to cross.

=== Civil parish ===
Donnybrook is a civil parish consisting of sixteen townlands. All but four of these townlands are situated in the Barony of Dublin. Donnybrook is the single biggest parish in that barony. The most southerly townlands, Annefield, Simmonscourt and Priesthouse, belong to the barony of Rathdown. The smallest of these, Annefield, is itself an enclave of Simmonscourt which gives its name to a pavilion of the Royal Dublin Society. Today, the majority of Priesthouse is occupied by Elm Park Golf Club and the studios of RTÉ. The remaining townland of Sallymount - the parish's most westerly point - is in the barony of Uppercross.

=== Administration ===
Donnybrook is in the Dáil constituency of Dublin Bay South and the local electoral area of Pembroke on Dublin City Council.

== Amenities ==
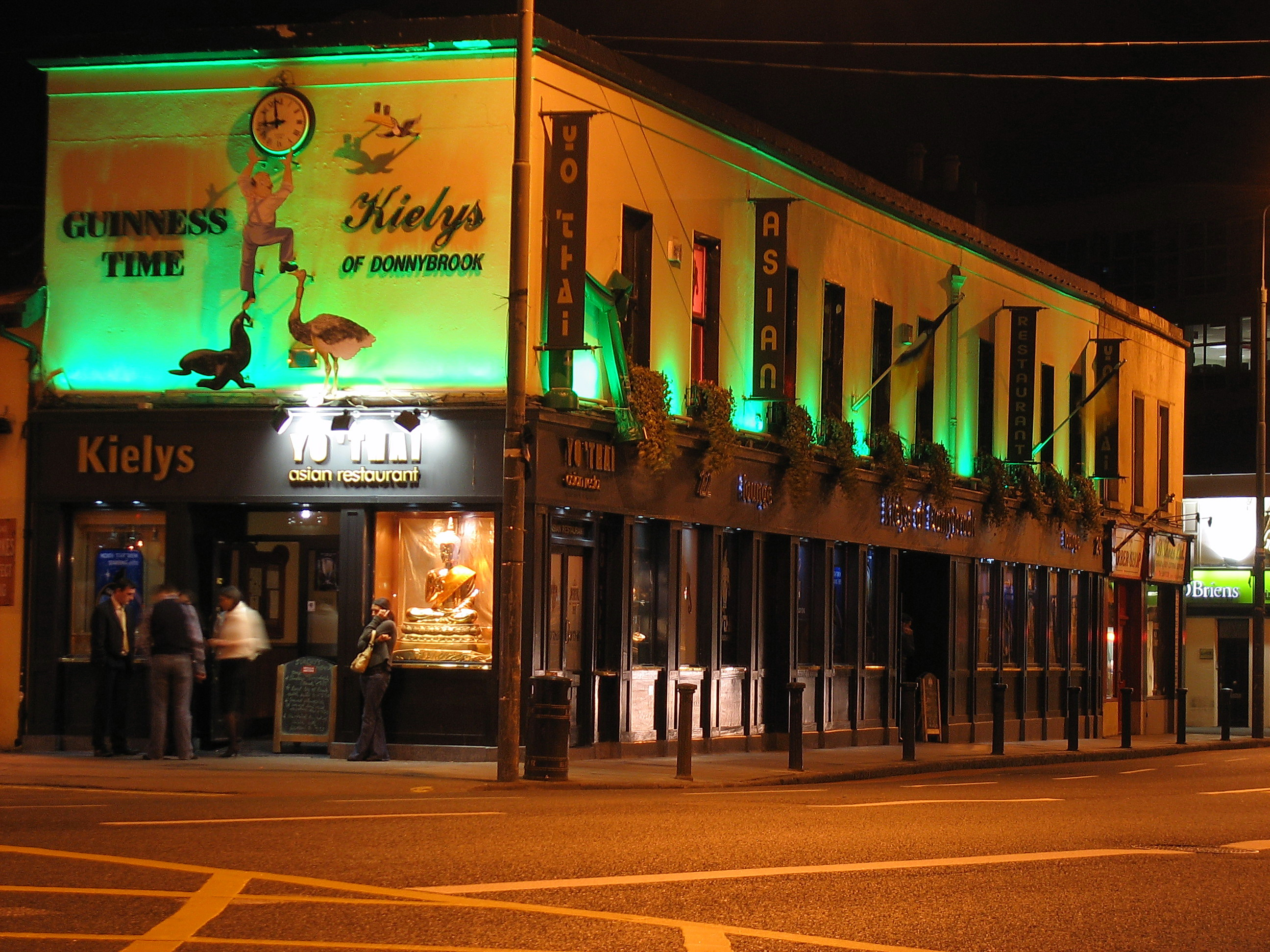
Kiely's pub in Donnybrook - now demolished

The television centre and radio studios of the national broadcaster, RTÉ, are located in Priesthouse, Donnybrook. There is also a large Dublin Bus garage located in the area.

Schools in the area include the all-girls Muckross Park College. The Teresian School is an all-girls secondary, junior and pre-school in Stillorgan Road. St. Mary's mixed primary school is located on Belmont Avenue.

== Sport ==
Donnybrook is the traditional home of rugby union in Leinster. The headquarters of the Irish Rugby Football Union Leinster Branch is located opposite Donnybrook Stadium, where the professional Leinster team played their home games until recently. Most games are hosted in Donnybrook Stadium. Some Junior Cup ties are also hosted on the grounds.

Rugby clubs Bective Rangers and Old Wesley have their home ground in Donnybrook Stadium. During the school year secondary schools such as St Conleth's College, Blackrock College, Belvedere College, Wesley College, Clongowes, St. Michaels and many more play rugby in Donnybrook Stadium.

There are several tennis clubs in Donnybrook, Donnybrook Lawn Tennis Club (LTC), St.Marys LTC and Bective LTC.

Belmont Football Club has its home ground in Herbert Park.

Merrion Cricket Club is located in Donnybrook, off Anglesea Road and backing onto the Dodder.

== People ==
- Brendan Behan, writer, bought a house in the area in the 1950s
- Padraic Colum, playwright, lived in Doonybrook before moving to Howth
- Éamon de Valera, President of Ireland
- Beatrice Doran, librarian, historian and author
- William Downes, 1st Baron Downes, 19-century judge
- John Boyd Dunlop, pneumatic tyre inventor, originally from Scotland
- Garret FitzGerald, former Taoiseach, lived on Eglinton Road in Donnybrook
- Denis Johnston, lived in Donnybrook with his wife, Shelah Richards (actress/director), and daughter, Jennifer Johnston (novelist)
- Patrick Kavanagh, poet and novelist originally from County Monaghan
- Benedict Kiely, writer and broadcaster originally from County Tyrone
- Shane MacGowan, singer/lyricist for the Pogues, lived in Donnybrook for a period
- Guglielmo Marconi, inventor associated with radio who lived in Montrose House, the home of his mother's family the Jamesons of whiskey fame, now on the grounds of RTÉ
- Frederick May, composer
- George E. H. McElroy, WWI fighter ace RFC/RAF
- Eibhlín Ní Chathailriabhaigh, Irish language activist
- Méav Ní Mhaolchatha, singer
- Flann O'Brien (aka Myles na gCopaleen aka Brian O'Nolan), lived on Belmont Avenue
- Batt O'Connor, member of the Irish Volunteers, politician and builder of several properties in Donnybrook, including his own home on Brendan Road (frequently visited by Michael Collins)
- The O'Rahilly, senior figure in the 1916 Easter Rising, lived at 40 Herbert Park
- Albert Reynolds, former Taoiseach
- Sir Ernest Henry Shackleton, explorer
- Anthony Trollope, 19th-century novelist, lived in the area for several years
- Jack B. Yeats, artist, lived on Marlborough Road in Donnybrook for a period

== See also ==
- List of towns and villages in Ireland
