= Dominick Giudice =

American football player (born 2002)

No. 56 – Missouri Tigers
- Position: Center
- Class: Redshirt Senior

Personal information
- Born: September 12, 2002 (age 24)
- Listed height: 6 ft 4 in (1.93 m)
- Listed weight: 312 lb (142 kg)

Career information
- High school: Mater Dei (New Monmouth, New Jersey)
- College: Michigan (2021–2024); Missouri (2025–present)

Awards and highlights
- CFP national champion (2023)
- Stats at ESPN

Dominick Giudice (born September 12, 2002) is an American football center for the Missouri Tigers. He previously played for the Michigan Wolverines.

== Early life ==
Giudice attended Mater Dei High School in New Monmouth, New Jersey, and committed to play college football for the Michigan Wolverines.

== College career ==
=== Michigan ===
In his first three seasons from 2021 to 2023, Giudice played in eight games as a backup offensive lineman and defensive lineman. Heading into the 2024 season, he was named the Wolverines starting center over Greg Crippen. Giudice appeared in 10 games with five starts on the season, after which he entered the NCAA transfer portal.

=== Missouri ===
Giudice transferred to play for the Missouri Tigers. During the 2025 season, he started in all 13 games for the Tigers.
