= Dublin (barony) =

Dublin (Irish: Barúntacht Bhaile Átha Cliath (Note: Placenames Database of Ireland.)) is one of the baronies in Ireland, an historical geographical unit of land. Its chief town is Donnybrook. It was created by the 1840 Acts from lands that were previously liberties in the county of the City of Dublin. Its name and area were confirmed by the Dublin Baronies Act 1842.

== Location ==
It is separated from the city proper by the line of the Grand canal with the Grand Canal Dock forming the northern land boundary along with the Great South Wall. Sandymount Strand at Irishtown forms the eastern boundary in a narrow strip of land extending as far as Blackrock. The Barony of Rathdown, whose chief town is Dún Laoghaire, forms the bulk of its southern border. To the west lies the barony of Uppercross, whose chief town is Tallaght.

== Legal context ==
Baronies were created after the Norman invasion as subdivisions of counties and were used for administration. Baronies continue to be regarded as officially defined units, but they are no longer used for many administrative purposes. While they have been administratively obsolete since 1898, they continue to be used in land registration and specification such as in planning permissions. In many cases, a barony corresponds to an earlier Gaelic túath which had submitted to the Crown. However, this barony was only created in 1840 out of parts of the Liberties of the City of Dublin. Previously, many of these townlands were part of the Barony of Dublin City. The distinction between the Barony of Dublin and the Barony of Dublin City is shown by a 1985 order adjusting their boundaries, and the inclusion of the 1842 Act in a 2007 list of unrepealed legislation. Both baronies lie within the former county borough of Dublin, since 2001 redesignated the City of Dublin.

== Civil parishes ==
There are six civil parishes either wholly or partly in the barony. The core of the barony is the civil parish of Donnybrook. With the exception of St Bartholemew's, each of the remaining parishes only contributes a single townland to the barony.

Civil Parish English Name	Civil Parish Irish Name	Townland
St Mark's	Paróiste Mharcais	South Lots
St Peter's	Paróiste Pheadair	Baggotrath North
St Bartholemew's	Paróiste San Parthalán	Baggotrath; Baggotrath East
Booterstown	Baile an Bhóthair	Intake
Monkstown	Baile na Manach	Newtown Blackrock
Donnybrook	Domhnach Broc	Baggotrath; Ballsbridge; Beggarsbush; Clonskeagh; Donnybrook East; Donnybrook West; Fortyacres; Irishtown; Merrion; Sandymount; Simmonscourt; Smotscourt; Ringsend

Note: the area of Newtown Blackrock in the barony at the Main Street is an exclave of the townland proper which lies in the adjacent Barony of Rathdown.

== See also ==
- List of subdivisions of County Dublin
- Dublin City Council
- St Bartholomew's Church, Dublin, the church of the eponymous civil parish
- St. Mark's Church, Dublin, the former church of the eponymous civil parish
- St. Peter's Church, Aungier Street, Dublin, the former church of the eponymous civil parish
- Shelbourne Road, the area encompassed by the townland of Beggarsbush
- Royal Dublin Society, whose land holdings take in much of the townland of Simmonscourt
