= Townland =

Small land division in Ireland and Outer Hebrides

Map of Rathlin Island with townlands

A townland (Irish: baile fearainn; Ulster-Scots: toonlann) is a traditional small land division used in Ireland and in the Western Isles of Scotland, typically covering 100–500 acres (40–202 ha). The townland system is of medieval Gaelic origin, predating the Norman invasion, and most have Irish-derived names. However, some townland names and boundaries come from Norman manors, plantation divisions, or later creations of the Ordnance Survey. Townlands cover the whole island of Ireland, and the total number of inhabited townlands in Ireland was 60,679 in 1911. The total number recognised by the Placenames Database of Ireland as of 2014 was 61,098, including uninhabited townlands.

== Etymology ==
The term "townland" in English is derived from the Old English word tūn, denoting an enclosure. The term describes the smallest unit of land division in Ireland, based on various forms of Gaelic land division, many of which had their own names.

The term baile, anglicised as "bally", is the most dominant element used in Irish townland names. Today, the term "bally" denotes an urban settlement, but its precise meaning in ancient Ireland is unclear, as towns had no place in Gaelic social organisation. The modern Irish term for a townland is baile fearainn (plural: bailte fearainn). The term fearann means "land, territory, quarter".

The Normans left no major traces in townland names, but they adapted some of them for their own use, possibly seeing a similarity between the Gaelic baile and the Norman bailey, both of which meant a settlement.

== Regional variation ==
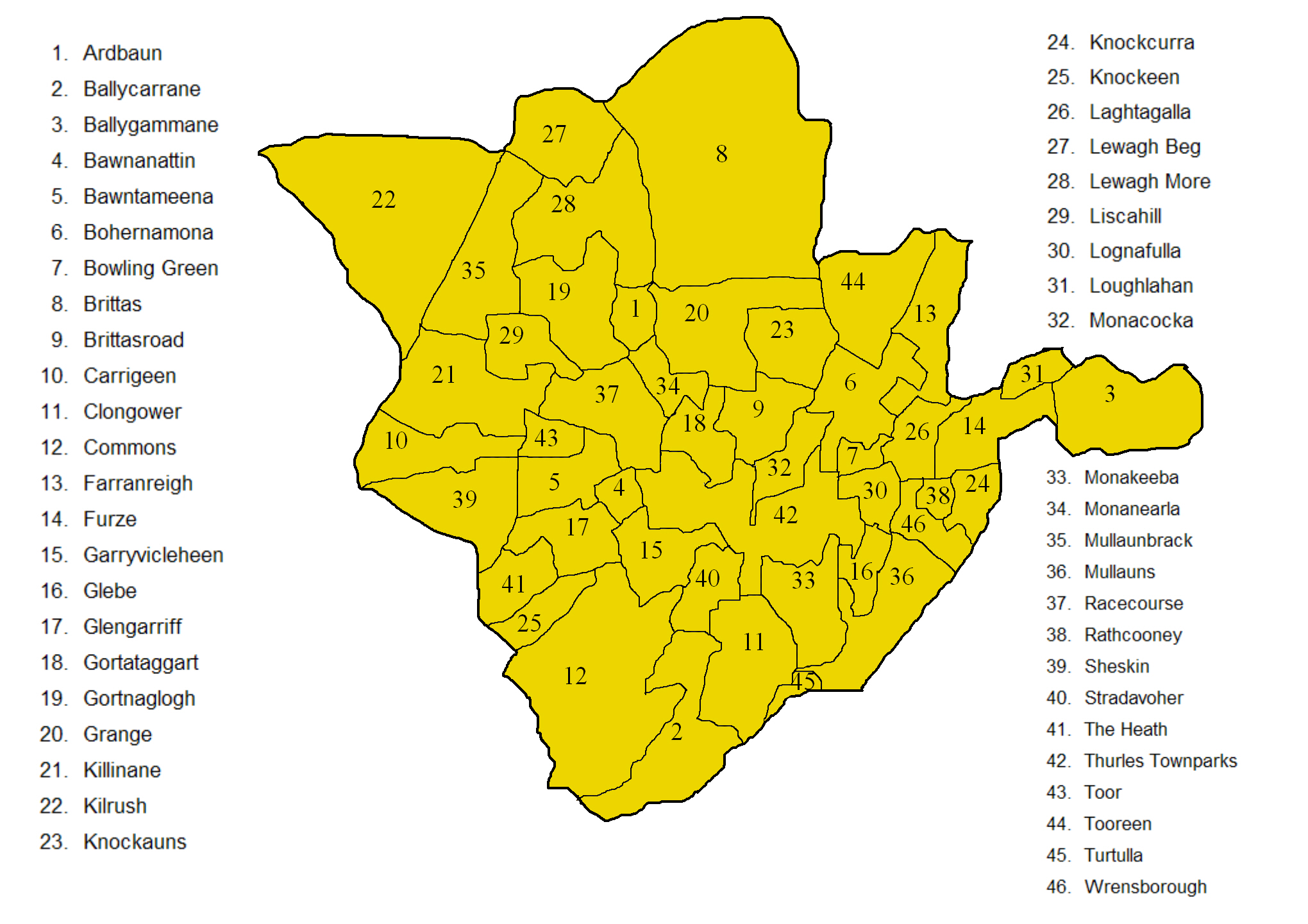
Map showing the townlands of the Thurles civil parish, Barony of Eliogarty, County Tipperary: The townlands of Thurles are typical, being of widely varying shapes and sizes with irregular borders, and forming a patchwork over the countryside. The townlands have a mean area of 64 hectares (160 acres).

Throughout most of Ulster, townlands were known as "ballyboes" (Irish: baile bó, meaning "cow land"), and represented an area of pastoral economic value. In County Cavan similar units were called "polls", and in Counties Fermanagh and Monaghan, they were known as tates or taths. These names appear to be of English origin, but had become naturalised long before 1600. Modern townlands with the prefix tat- are confined almost exclusively to the diocese of Clogher, which covers Counties Fermanagh and Monaghan, and the barony of Clogher in County Tyrone, and cannot be confused with any other Irish word. The use of the term can also be seen in the diocese of Clogher parish of Inniskeen area within Louth where the townlands of Edenagrena, Drumsinnot, Killaconner and Torpass were referred to collectively as "the four tates of Ballyfoylan." In modern townland names the prefix pol- is widely found throughout western Ireland, its accepted meaning being "hole" or "hollow". In County Cavan, which contains over half of all townlands in Ulster with the prefix pol-, some should probably be better translated as "the poll of ...".

In County Tyrone, the following hierarchy of land divisions was used: "ballybetagh" (Irish: baile beithigh, meaning "cattle place"), "ballyboe", "sessiagh" (Irish: séú cuid, meaning sixth part of a quarter), "gort" and "quarter" (Irish: ceathrú). In County Fermanagh the divisions were "ballybetagh", "quarter" and "tate". Further subdivisions in Fermanagh appear to be related to liquid or grain measures such as "gallons", "pottles" and "pints".

In Ulster, the ballybetagh was the territorial unit controlled by an Irish sept, typically containing around 16 townlands. Fragmentation of ballybetaghs resulted in units consisting of four, eight, and twelve townlands. One of these fragmented units, the "quarter", representing a quarter of a ballybetagh, was the universal land denomination recorded in the survey of County Donegal conducted in 1608. In the early 17th century 20 per cent of the total area of western Ulster was under the control of the church. These "termonn" lands consisted likewise of ballybetaghs and ballyboes, but were held by erenaghs instead of sept leaders.

Other units of land division used throughout Ireland include:

- In County Tipperary, "capell lands" and "quatermeers". A "capell land" consisted of around 20 great acres (one great acre equalled 20 English acres).
- In the province of Connacht, "quarters" and "cartrons" (Irish: ceathrú mír, also anglicised as "carrowmeer"), a quarter being reckoned as four cartrons, and each cartron being 30 acres. The quarter has also been anglicised as "carrow", "carhoo" or "caracute" (Irish: ceathrú cuid).
- In County Clare, as in Connacht, "quarters", "half-quarters" (Irish: leath-ceathrú), "cartrons" and "sessiagh". Here a "half-quarter" equated to around 60 acres, a "cartron" equated to around 30 acres and a "sessiagh" was around 20 acres.

"Cartrons" were also sometimes called "ploughlands" or "seisreagh" (Irish: seisreach, meaning a team of horses yoked to a plough).

Thomas Larcom, the first Director of the Ordnance Survey of Ireland, made a study of the ancient land divisions of Ireland and summarised the traditional hierarchy of land divisions thus:

10 acres – 1 Gneeve; 2 Gneeves – 1 Sessiagh; 3 Sessiaghs – 1 Tate or Ballyboe; 2 Ballyboes – 1 Ploughland, Seisreagh or Carrow; 4 Ploughlands – 1 Ballybetagh, or Townland; 30 Ballybetaghs – Triocha Céad or Barony.

This hierarchy was not applied uniformly across Ireland. For example, a ballybetagh or townland could contain more or less than four ploughlands. Further confusion arises when it is taken into account that, while Larcom used the general term "acres" in his summary, terms such as "great acres", "large acres" and "small acres" were also used in records. Writing in 1846, Larcom remarked that the "large" and "small" acres had no fixed ratio between them, and that there were various other kinds of acre in use in Ireland, including the Irish acre, the English acre, the Cunningham acre, the plantation acre and the statute acre. The Ordnance Survey maps used the statute acre measurement. The quality and situation of the land affected the size of these acres. The Cunningham acre is given as intermediate between the Irish and English acres.

Many of these land division terms have been preserved in the names of modern townlands. For example, the term "cartron" in both its English and Irish forms has been preserved in the townland names of Carrowmeer, Cartron and Carrowvere, while the term "sessiagh" survives in the names Shesia, Sheshodonell, Sheshymore and Shessiv. The terms "ballyboe" and "ballybetagh" tend to be preserved in the truncated form of "bally" as a prefix for some townland names, such as Ballymacarattybeg near Poyntzpass, County Down. Less well-known land division terms may be found in other townland names such as Coogulla (Irish: Cuige Uladh, "the Ulster fifth"), Treanmanagh (Irish: an train meánach, "the third middle") and Dehomade (Irish: an deichiú méid, "the tenth part").

A problem with the term "bally" in some townland names is that it can be difficult to distinguish between the Irish terms baile meaning "townland" and béal átha meaning "approach to a ford". An example of the latter is Ballyshannon, County Donegal, which is derived from Béal Átha Seanaidh.

"Sub-townlands" (Irish: fo-bhaile) are also recorded in some areas, smaller divisions of a townland with their own traditional names.

== Size and value ==
In Ireland, a townland is generally the smallest or lowest-level unit of land, though a few large townlands are further divided into hundreds. The average area of a townland is about 325 acres (1.32 km^{2}; 132 ha), but they vary widely in size. William Reeves's 1861 survey states that the smallest was Old Church Yard, near Carrickmore, in the parish of Termonmagurk, County Tyrone, at 0.625 acres (0.253 ha) (Note: 2 roods, 10 perches) and the largest, at 7,555 acres (30.57 km^{2}; 11.805 sq mi), was and is Fionnán (also called Finnaun) in the parish of Killanin, County Galway. In fact, the townland of Clonskeagh in the barony of Uppercross (abutting the main Clonskeagh townland in the barony of Dublin) was only 0.3 acres (1,200 m^{2}) (Note: 1 rood, 8 perches) although the area is now urbanised, so that the townlands are unused and their boundaries are uncertain.

The ballyboe, a townland unit used in Ulster, was described in 1608 as containing 60 acres of arable land, meadow, and pasture. However, this was misleading, as the size of townlands under the Gaelic system varied depending upon their quality, situation and economic potential. This economic potential varied from the extent of land required to graze cattle to the land required to support several families. The highest density of townland units recorded in Ulster in 1609 corresponds to the areas with the highest land valuations in the 1860s.

It seems that many moorland areas were not divided into townlands until fairly recently. These areas were "formerly shared as a common summer pasturage by the people of a whole parish or barony".

== Historical use ==
Until the 19th century most townlands were owned by single landlords and occupied by multiple tenants. The cess, used to fund roadworks and other local expenses, was charged at the same rate on each townland in a barony, regardless of its size and productive capacity. Thus, occupiers in a small or poor townland suffered in comparison to those of larger or more fertile townlands. This was reformed by Griffith's Valuation.

It was in the 1600s that they were mapped and defined by the English administration for the purpose of confiscating land and apportioning it to investors or planters from Britain.

== Irish Ordnance Survey and standardisation ==
During the 19th century an extensive series of maps of Ireland was created by the Irish division of the Ordnance Survey for taxation purposes. These maps both documented and standardised the boundaries of the more than 60,000 townlands in Ireland. The process often involved dividing or amalgamating existing townlands, and defining townland boundaries in areas such as mountain or bog that had previously been outside the townland system. Slight adjustments are still made. There were 60,679 in 1911, compared to 60,462 townlands in 1901.

== Current use ==
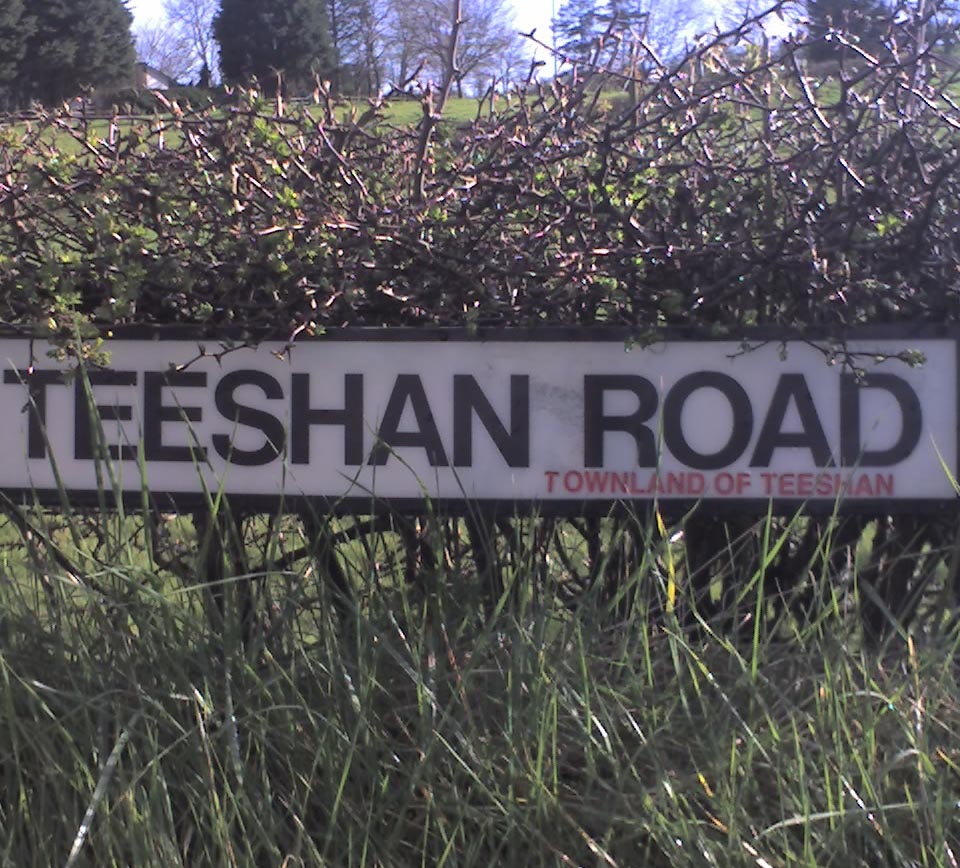
A road sign in County Antrim, Northern Ireland, notes that this part of the road lies within Teeshan townland.

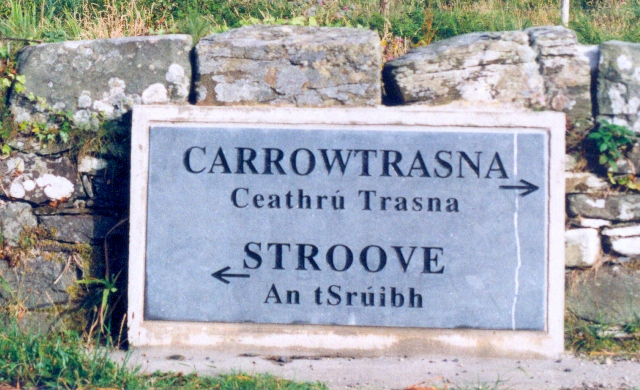
A (rare) townland boundary marker in Inishowen, County Donegal

Townlands form the building blocks for higher-level administrative units such as parishes and district electoral divisions (in the Republic of Ireland) or wards (in Northern Ireland).

Before 1972 townlands were included on all rural postal addresses throughout the island, but in that year the Royal Mail decided that the townland element of the address was obsolete in Northern Ireland. Townland names were not banned, but they were deemed "superfluous information" and people were asked not to include them on addresses. They were to be replaced by house numbers, road names and postcodes. In response the Townlands Campaign emerged to protest against the changes. It was described as a "ground-level community effort". Taking place in the midst of The Troubles, the campaign was a rare example of unity between Catholics and Protestants, nationalists and unionists. Townlands and their names "seem to have been considered as a shared resource and heritage". Those involved in the campaign argued that, in many areas, people still strongly identified with their townlands and that this gave them a sense of belonging. The Royal Mail's changes were seen as a severing of this link.

At the time the county councils were the government bodies responsible for validating the change. However, as local government itself was undergoing changes, the Royal Mail's decision was "allowed ... to become law almost by default". County Fermanagh is the only county in Northern Ireland that managed to resist the change completely. Nevertheless, many newer road signs in parts of Northern Ireland now show townland names (see picture). In 2001 the Northern Ireland Assembly passed a motion requesting government departments to make use of townland addresses in correspondence and publications.

In the Republic of Ireland townlands continue to be used on addresses. In 2005 the Department of Communications, Energy and Natural Resources announced that a postcode system was to be introduced (see Republic of Ireland postal addresses). The system, known as Eircode, was introduced in 2014, but although more widely used by 2021, townlands remain predominant address identifiers in rural areas. Townland names and boundaries are rarely indicated physically on the landscape. One exception was a 2002 scheme funded by CLÁR, a rural development agency, to encourage local communities to erect stone signs with their townland name.
