= Mark LaMura =

American actor (1948–2017)

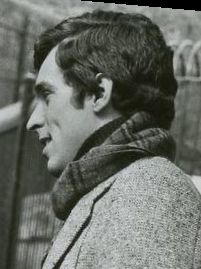
- LaMura in 1977
- Born: October 18, 1948; Perth Amboy, New Jersey, U.S.
- Died: September 11, 2017 (aged 68); New York City, New York, U.S.
- Education: Saint Joseph's College (Indiana) (1970)
- Occupation: Actor
- Years active: 1972–2017
- Known for: Mark Dalton
- Notable work: All My Children; Star Trek: The Next Generation (season 3)
- Spouse: Elizabeth Maclellan
- Children: Gabrielle LaMura
- Parent(s): Robert E. LaMura and Elizabeth Devlin LaMura

Mark LaMura (October 18, 1948 – September 11, 2017) was an American television actor. His name was occasionally spelled as Mark La Mura or Mark Lamura.

== Early years ==
LaMura was born in Perth Amboy, New Jersey, raised in Matawan and Marlboro, N.J. One of six siblings born to Robert E. LaMura and Elizabeth (née Devlin) LaMura. He graduated from Mater Dei High School. He was educated at Kent State University, St. Joseph's College, and the American Academy of Dramatic Arts.

== Career ==
He portrayed Mark Dalton on All My Children for 11 years, and made special guest appearances in 1994, 1995, and 2005. In 1988, he was nominated for the Daytime Emmy Award for his performance. He also appeared on the soap operas As the World Turns and One Life to Live, and guest starred on a number of television series including Star Trek: The Next Generation, 30 Rock, Damages, Law & Order: Special Victims Unit, and The Sopranos.

He earned credentials in theatrical productions such as Shakespeare plays and The Rise Of Dorothy Hale. He played Oscar Madison in the 2013 revival production of The Odd Couple, with co-star Jeff Talbott as Felix Unger.

== Personal life ==
LaMura was married to Elizabeth Maclellan, an actress, and they had one daughter, Gabrielle.

LaMura died due to complications from lung cancer on September 11, 2017.
