= Bob Halloran (ABC sportscaster) =

American news and sports anchor

Bob Halloran is the former Friday and Saturday nights news anchor and sports anchor for WCVB Channel 5, an ABC affiliate located in the Boston, Massachusetts media market.

He is the author of Irish Thunder: The Hard Life and Times of Micky Ward, a boxing biography on "Irish " Micky Ward, published in 2007 by Lyons Press. Paramount Pictures has retained Bob Halloran as a technical consultant for the producers of the film The Fighter starring Mark Wahlberg as Micky Ward and Christian Bale as Micky's brother Dicky Eklund.

In 2004, Halloran wrote Destiny Derailed, a book on the collapse of the Boston Red Sox 2003 playoff run. In 2010, his book "Breakdown: The Story of Gang Warfare, High School Football, and the Coach who Policed the Streets" was released.

Halloran is an adjunct faculty member teaching news journalism courses in the communications department at Curry College in Milton, Massachusetts. He has also been a regular contributor as a sports columnist for the Boston Metro newspaper.

Halloran has worked as an anchor for ESPNews, writer for ESPN.com, a sports reporter for WFXT Fox 25 News in Boston, a co-host of a sports talk radio show for 890 ESPN in Boston, and as a news anchor on WCVX TV58 Cape Cod in the early 1990s. A native of Middletown Township, New Jersey, he is a graduate of Mater Dei High School and Washington and Lee University.

On March 23, 2023, Halloran announced he would retire from WCVB effective May 31, 2023.
