= Darnell Washington =

American football player (born 2001)

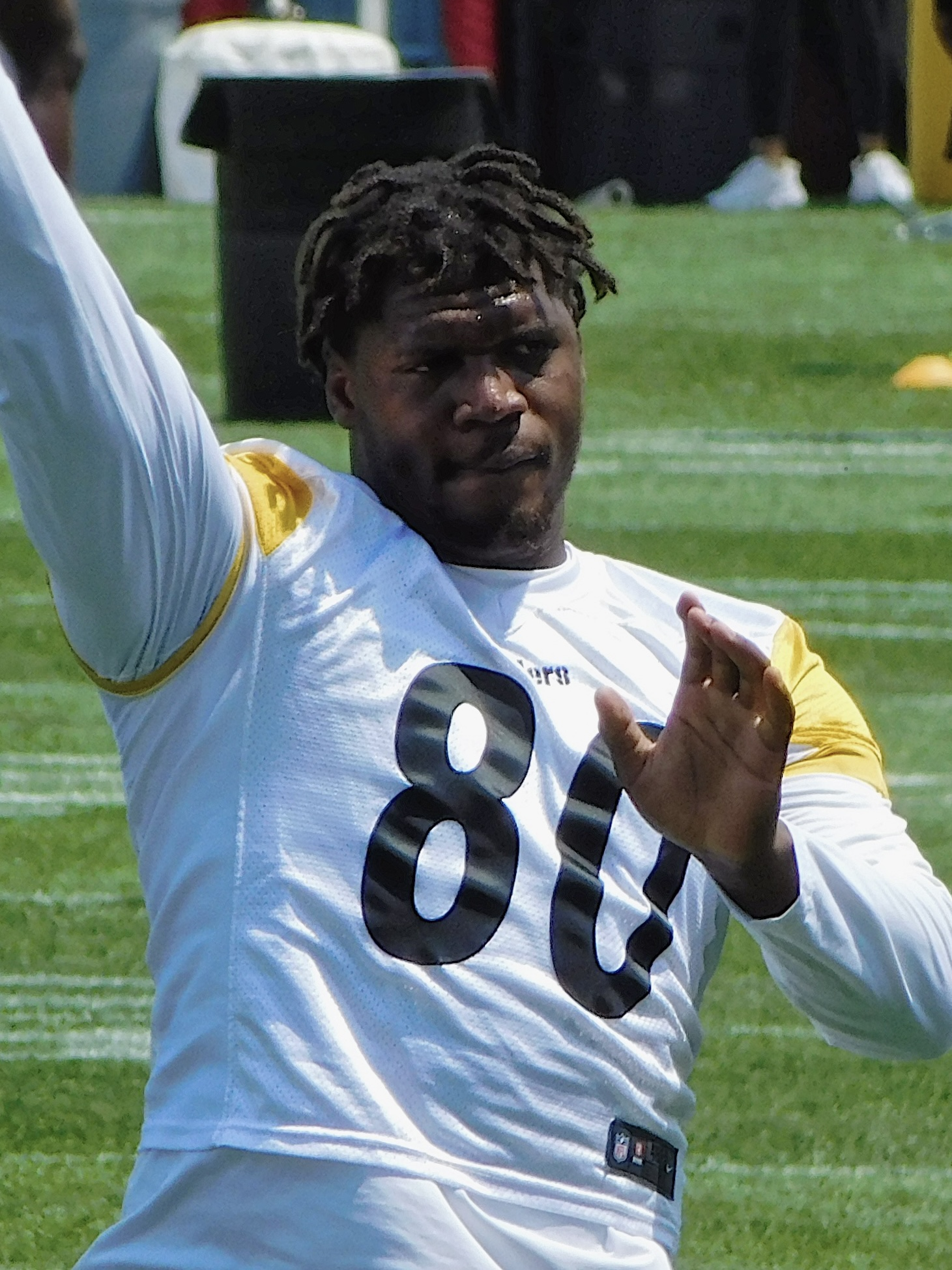
- Washington with the Pittsburgh Steelers in 2025

No. 80 – Pittsburgh Steelers
- Position: Tight end
- Roster status: Active

Personal information
- Born: August 17, 2001 (age 25); Las Vegas, Nevada, U.S.
- Listed height: 6 ft 7 in (2.01 m)
- Listed weight: 264 lb (120 kg)

Career information
- High school: Desert Pines (Las Vegas)
- College: Georgia (2020–2022)
- NFL draft: 2023: 3rd round, 93rd overall pick

Career history
- Pittsburgh Steelers (2023–present)

Awards and highlights
- 2× CFP national champion (2021, 2022); Second-team All-SEC (2022)

Career NFL statistics as of Week 10, 2026
- Receptions: 77
- Receiving yards: 884
- Receiving touchdowns: 5
- Stats at Pro Football Reference

Darnell Ernest Washington (born August 17, 2001), nicknamed "Mount Washington", is an American professional football tight end for the Pittsburgh Steelers of the National Football League (NFL). He was a two-time CFP national champion while playing college football at Georgia, winning in 2021 and 2022.

== Early life ==
Washington was born in Las Vegas, Nevada, on August 17, 2001.

Washington experienced homelessness throughout his childhood.

He attended Desert Pines High School, where he played football and basketball. During his time on the football team Desert Pines won back to back state championships in the years 2016–2017. A five-star recruit in football, he committed to play college football at the University of Georgia.

== College career ==
As a true freshman at Georgia, Darnell recorded 166 yards on seven receptions.

In Washington's second season he put up 145 yards on nine receptions and scored one touchdown. This touchdown was the first of Washington's career and it came in the SEC Championship Game against Alabama. Washington's longest gain of the season came on a 32 yard reception against Florida. He appeared in seven games and missed time due to having to have surgery for a minor fracture in his foot. In the 2022 College Football Playoff National Championship, Georgia defeated Alabama 33–18.

During Washington's third season, he recorded 28 receptions for 454 yards and two touchdowns. As a result, Washington was named to the Second-team All-SEC. On January 12, 2023, Washington declared for the 2023 NFL draft.

== Professional career ==
Pre-draft measurables
Height	Weight	Arm length	Hand span	Wingspan	40-yard dash	10-yard split	20-yard split	20-yard shuttle	Vertical jump	Broad jump	Bench press
6 ft 6 5/8 in (2.00 m)	264 lb (120 kg)	34 3/8 in (0.87 m)	11 in (0.28 m)	6 ft 11 3/4 in (2.13 m)	4.64 s	1.57 s	2.67 s	4.08 s	31.0 in (0.79 m)	10 ft 2 in (3.10 m)	21 reps
All values from NFL Combine

=== Pittsburgh Steelers ===
==== 2023 ====
Washington was drafted 93rd overall in the 2023 NFL draft by the Pittsburgh Steelers and on May 12, 2023, he signed his rookie contract. As a rookie, he appeared in all 17 games and made seven starts. He had seven receptions for 61 receiving yards. During his tenure as a rookie, he was given the nickname "Mount Washington" due to his large frame and as a reference to the Pittsburgh landmark/neighborhood Mount Washington.

==== 2024 ====
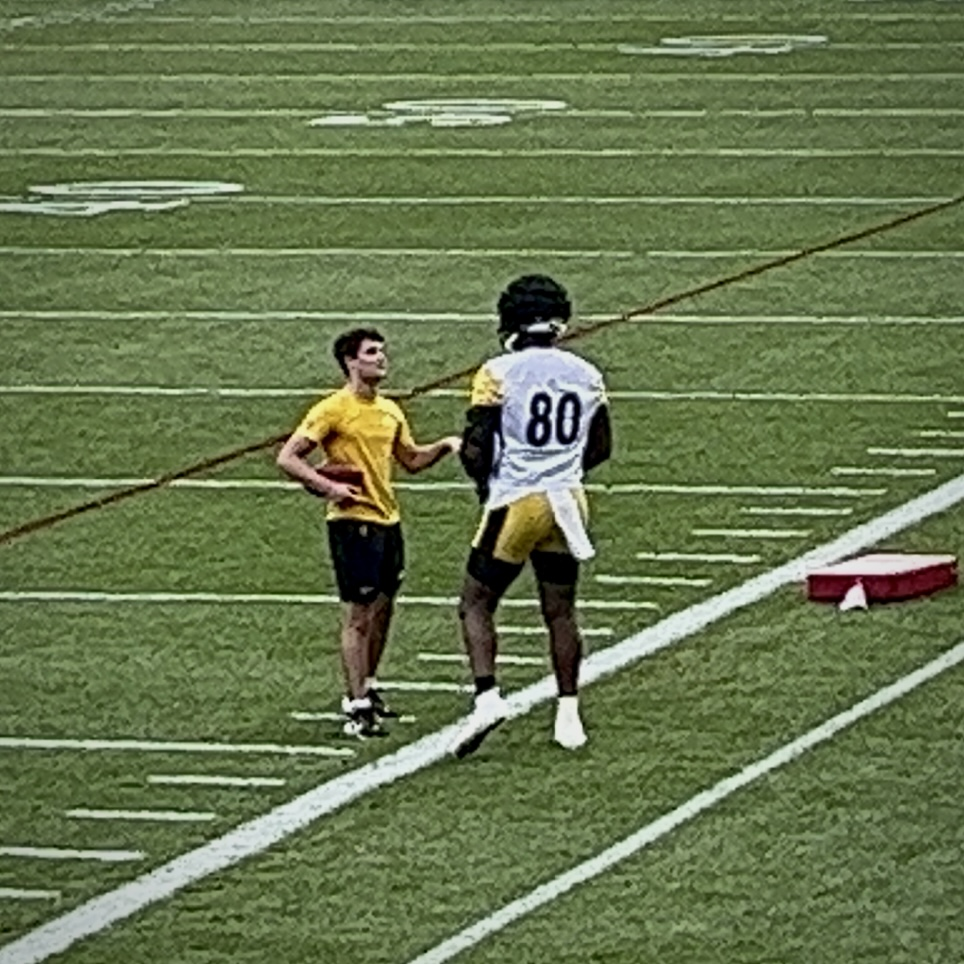
Washington during Steelers training camp in 2024

In his second season, Washington would score his first career touchdown on a five-yard pass from Justin Fields to put the first points on the board in a 13–6 Steelers victory over the Denver Broncos. After the touchdown reception, Washington celebrated by giving a salute. He would explain in a post-game interview the salute was for his brother, a member of the United States Marines. During his sophomore season, Washington's size began to be utilized in the passing game. He recorded at least two catches for 25 plus yards in the first five games in which Russell Wilson started at the quarterback position. His 11 receptions through those five games eclipsed his entire 17 game total of seven from 2023.

He finished the 2024 regular season making 19 catches on 25 targets for 200 yards and a touchdown. He made a second postseason appearance in the team's 28–14 Wild Card loss to the Baltimore Ravens where he made one catch for nine yards.

==== 2025 ====
In a 33–31 loss to the Cincinnati Bengals, Washington secured 3 out of 5 targets and scored his second career touchdown. In the Week 17 game against the Cleveland Browns, he left prematurely in the first quarter after breaking his arm. On December 30, 2025, the Steelers announced that Washington had undergone surgery to fix his arm and that he would be out for the remainder of the season as a result; he was placed on injured reserve the following day.

==== 2026 ====
On June 3, 2026, Washington agreed to a four-year, $42 million contract extension with the Steelers, including $21 million guaranteed.

== Personal life ==
Washington married his wife, Estefany, in 2020. They have four children.

== Career statistics ==
=== NFL ===
Legend
**Bold**	Career high

==== Regular season ====
Year	Team	Games		Receiving				
Year	Team	GP	GS	Rec	Yds	Y/R	Lng	TD
2023	PIT	17	7	7	61	8.7	12	0
2024	PIT	17	9	19	200	10.5	29	1
2025	PIT	16	13	**31**	**364**	11.7	36	1
2026	PIT	9	9	20	259	13.0	**58**	**3**
Career		59	38	77	884	11.5	58	5

==== Postseason ====
Year	Team	Games		Receiving				
Year	Team	GP	GS	Rec	Yds	Y/R	Lng	TD
2023	PIT	1	1	0	0	0.0	0	0
2024	PIT	1	0	**1**	**9**	**9.0**	**9**	0
Career		2	1	1	9	9.0	9	0

=== College ===
Year	Team	GP	Receiving			
Year	Team	GP	Rec	Yds	Avg	TD
2020	Georgia	10	7	166	**23.7**	0
2021	Georgia	11	10	154	15.4	1
2022	Georgia	**15**	**28**	**454**	16.2	**2**
Career		36	45	774	17.2	3
