= Mater Dei High School (New Jersey) =

Catholic school in Monmouth County, New Jersey, US

Mater Dei Prep High School
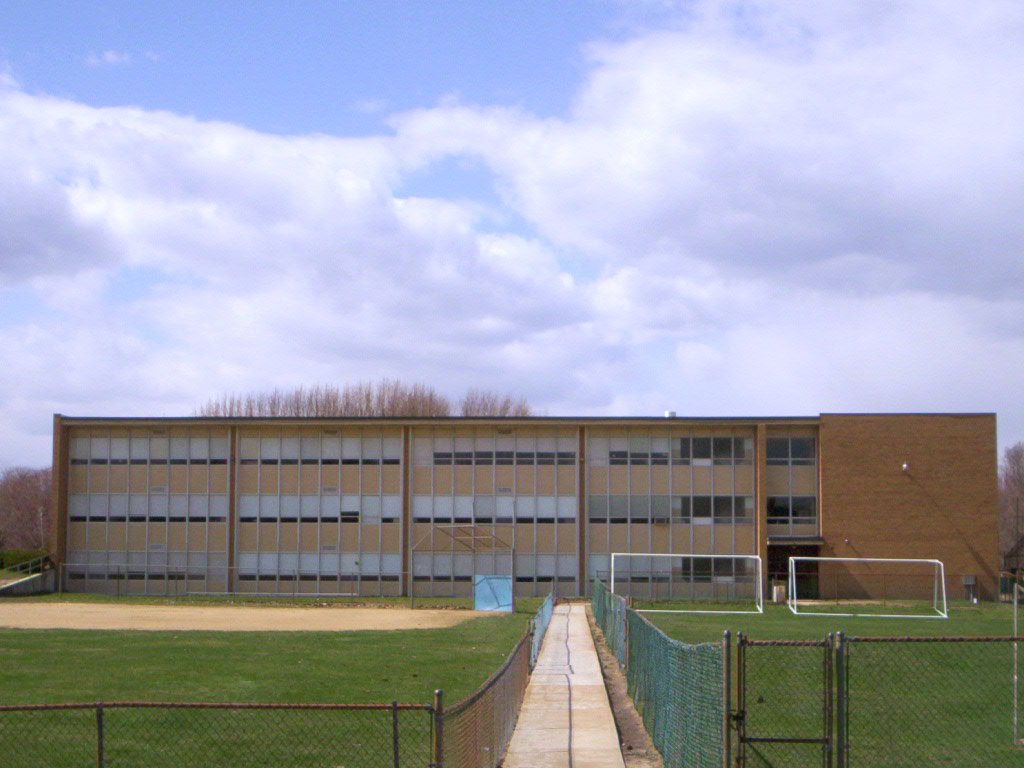

Location
- 538 Church Street; Middletown Township, Monmouth County, New Jersey 07748; United States; 40°24′54″N 74°06′15″W

Information
- Type: Private, Coeducational
- Motto: Fide et Fortitudine (Faith and Fortitude)
- Religious affiliation: Roman Catholic
- Established: 1961
- Founder: Monsignor Robert T. Bulman
- Closed: 2022
- School district: Diocese of Trenton
- NCES School ID: 00867797
- President: Donald Galante
- Principal: Debra Serafin
- Faculty: 21.4 FTEs
- Grades: 9–12
- Enrollment: 223 (as of 2021–22)
- Student to teacher ratio: 10.4:1
- Colors: Navy blue Columbia blue and White
- Song: Seraphs are a Powerhouse
- Athletics conference: Shore Conference
- Team name: Seraphs
- Rival: Saint John Vianney
- Accreditation: Middle State Association of Colleges and Schools
- Publication: Insights (literary magazine)
- Newspaper: The Seraph
- Yearbook: Theotokos
- Tuition: $13,545 (2022–23)
- Affiliation: Diocese of Trenton
- Patron saint: Blessed Virgin Mary
- Website: www.materdeiprep.org

Mater Dei Prep: A Catholic Preparatory School (commonly known as "Mater Dei High School") was a four-year Catholic coeducational high school that served students in ninth through twelfth grades, located in the New Monmouth section of Middletown Township, in Monmouth County, in the U.S. state of New Jersey.

== History ==
The school was founded in September 1961 by the Reverend Monsignor Robert T. Bulman and is located on a small portion of the parish's 32-acre (130,000 m^{2}) campus. The school attracted students from over 30 parochial, private, and public schools in Monmouth County and Middlesex County. The school maintained an average enrollment of 435 students in grades nine through twelve.

Mater Dei was a part of St. Mary Parish and later operated under the supervision of the Roman Catholic Diocese of Trenton. The school was accredited by the Middle State Association of Colleges and Schools Commission on Elementary and Secondary Schools and was a member of the National Catholic Educational Association (NCEA).

The virtual learning program began in 2005 and ended in 2010. Virtual learning classes included all levels, including Advanced Placement, in Math, Foreign Languages (Latin, Italian, and Chinese) as well as History.

In February 2015, the pastor of St. Mary Parish announced that the school would be closing at the end of the 2014-15 school year, in the wake of chronic fiscal deficits. A few days after the announcement, it was disclosed that the Parish Finance Council had agreed to a two-month extension in order to raise the $1 million needed to remain open. Through the Seraph's Fund, and efforts by the student body, $1 million was raised in a two-month span and the school was able to open for the 2015-16 school year.

As of the 2021–22 school year, the school had an enrollment of 223 students and 21.4 classroom teachers (on an FTE basis), for a student–teacher ratio of 10.4:1. The school's student body was 66.4% (148) White, 15.7% (35) Hispanic, 11.7% (26) Black, 4.0% (9) Asian and 2.2% (5) two or more races.

On May 9, 2022, it was announced that the school would be closing at the end of the school year due to a dramatic decline in enrollment.

The school's building was used in 2023 for principal photography of the 2024 film Mean Girls.

The building was demolished in 2025.. The athletic fields and remaining land are now a public park operated by Middletown.

== Athletics ==
The Mater Dei Prep Seraphs competed in Division B Central of the Shore Conference, an athletic conference comprised of public and private high schools in Monmouth and Ocean counties along the Jersey Shore. The conference operates under the jurisdiction of the New Jersey State Interscholastic Athletic Association (NJSIAA). With 212 students in grades 10-12, the school was classified by the NJSIAA for the 2019–20 school year as Non-Public B for most athletic competition purposes, which included schools with an enrollment of 37 to 366 students in that grade range (equivalent to Group I for public schools). The school was classified by the NJSIAA as Non-Public Group III for football for 2018–2020.

The school participates as the host school / lead agency for joint cooperative football team with Ranney School. The co-op program operates under an agreement scheduled to expire at the end of the 2023–24 school year.

The boys track team won the Non-Public Group B spring / outdoor track state championship in 1967, 1973, 1999, 2000, 2006 and 2017-2019. The program has won 10 state titles, which is tied for eighth-most among all schools in New Jersey In June 2018, the team set numerous school records and took home both a sectional title and their second consecutive Non-Public B group state title.

The baseball team won the Non-Public B South championship in 1967, 1968 and 1970.

The girls cross country team won the Group I state championship in 1976, 1977, 1987, 1991 and 1992, and won the Non-Public Group B state title in 1982-1985. The nine state championships won by the program are ranked fifth in New Jersey.

The girls basketball team won the Group I state championship in 1980 (defeating Benedictine Academy in the tournament final) and won the Non-Public Group B title in 1990 (vs. Immaculate Conception High School of Montclair). The team won the 1980 Group I title with a 64-52 win in the finals against Benedictine Academy.

The boys soccer team won the Non-Public Group B state championship in 1981 and 1983, against runner-up Eastern Christian High School both years in the finals of the tournament. The 1983 team finished the season with a 16-4 record after defeating Eastern Christian by a score of 3-1 at Mercer County Park in the Parochial B finals.

The boys' tennis team won the Non-Public B/C state championship in 1981, defeating Oratory Preparatory School in the final match of the tournament.

The girls' spring track team was the Group I state champion in 1981 and won the Non-Public Group B title in 1982, 1983 and 2000.

The boys' track team won the indoor track state championship in Non-Public Group B in 1981.

The girls' tennis team won the Non-Public B state championship in 1982, defeating Pope John XXIII Regional High School 5-0 in the tournament final.

The boys' cross country running team won the Non-Public Group B state championship in 1984, 1985, 1997, 1999, 2007 and 2017. The program's seven state titles are tied for tenth-most in the state.

The softball team won the Group II state championship in 2008, defeating Montclair Kimberley Academy in the finals of the tournament.

The football team won the Non-Public Group II state sectional championship in 2016, winning by a score of 26-20 in the tournament final against Holy Spirit High School on a touchdown scored on a hook and lateral play with 11 seconds left in the game.

The boys' track team won the indoor relay state championship in Non-Public Group B in 2018 and 2019. The girls team won the Group II title in 2013, In 2018, the boys' winter / indoor track team finished their season with the program's first state indoor relay championship title and was runner-up in the Non-Public B state championships.

== Notable alumni ==
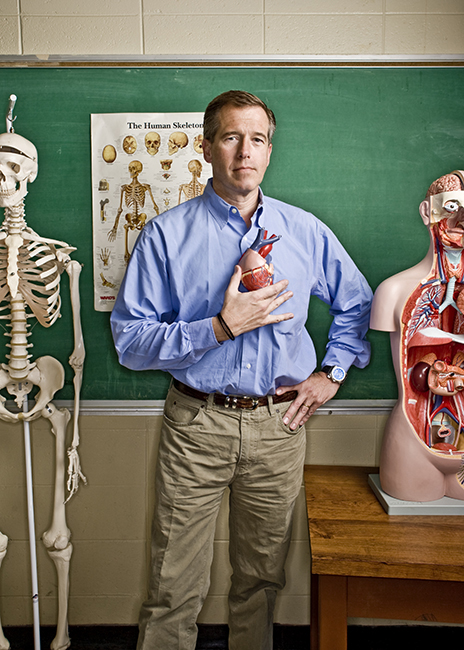
Brian Williams in 2008

- Mary Kay Adams (born 1962, class of 1979), television actress
- Joe Benning (born 1956, class of 1975), member of the Vermont Senate who has represented the Caledonia District since 2011
- Gerard Canonico (born 1989), original Broadway cast member of the musical, Spring Awakening
- Ken Croken (born 1950), politician and retired attorney who has represented the 97th district of the Iowa House of Representatives since January 2023
- Billy Devaney (born 1955, class of 1973), ESPN football analyst who was General Manager of the St. Louis Rams from 2008 to 2011
- Nick Gillespie (born 1963, class of 1981), editor in chief of Reason magazine from 2000 to 2008 and of its online video website Reason.tv from 2008 to 2017
- Dominick Giudice (born 2002, class of 2021), college football center for the Missouri Tigers
- Bob Halloran, sportscaster and author of Irish Thunder: The Hard Life and Times of Micky Ward
- Robert Harper (1951–2020), stage, film and television actor
- Ted Kurdyla, film, television and stage producer
- Mark LaMura (1948–2017), actor who has played the role of Mark Dalton on All My Children
- Clarence Lewis (born 2000), American football defensive back for the Tennessee Titans.
- Ryan McCormick (born 1991), professional golfer who plays on the PGA Tour
- Brian Williams (born 1959, class of 1977), anchor and managing editor for NBC Nightly News
- Richie Williams (born 1970, class of 1988), former player for the MetroStars, who was an assistant coach for the New York Red Bulls
