= Greg Crippen =

American football player (born 2002)

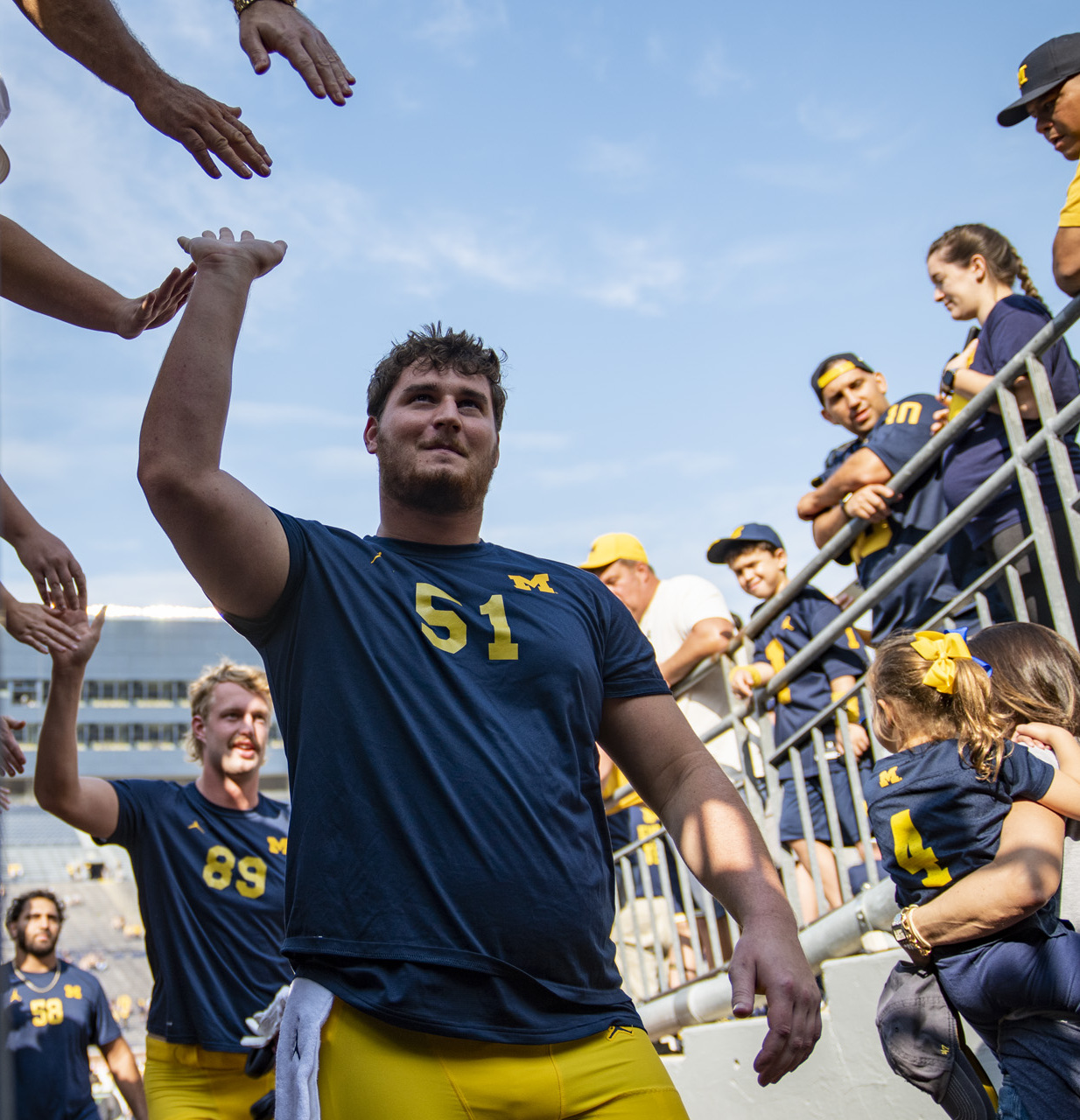

Profile
- Position: Center

Personal information
- Born: February 17, 2002 (age 24)
- Listed height: 6 ft 3 in (1.91 m)
- Listed weight: 301 lb (137 kg)

Career information
- High school: IMG Academy (Bradenton, Florida)
- College: Michigan (2021–2025)
- NFL draft: 2026: undrafted

Career history
- Pittsburgh Steelers (2026)*
- * Offseason or practice squad member only

Awards and highlights
- CFP national champion (2023)
- Stats at ESPN

Gregory Thomas Crippen (born February 17, 2002) is an American professional football center. He played college football for the Michigan Wolverines, winning three consecutive Big Ten Conference titles and a national championship in 2023. Crippen was signed by the Steelers as an undrafted free agent in 2026.

== Early life ==
Crippen attended Milton Academy for his freshman year, before transferring to IMG Academy. Coming out of high school, he was rated as a four star recruit, the 11th overall offensive guard, and the 222nd overall player in the class of 2021, where he held offers from schools such as Alabama, Auburn, Michigan, Notre Dame, Ohio State, and USC. Initially, Crippen committed to play college football for the Notre Dame Fighting Irish. However, he later de-committed and signed to play for the Michigan Wolverines. In 2024, Crippen graduated from Michigan's School of Kinesiology with a sport management degree.

== College career ==
Crippen appeared in six games as a freshman in 2021 before taking a redshirt in 2022. He played in nine games in 2023 as he helped the Wolverines to a national championship. Crippen entered the 2024 season as the backup center once again, but by week 7 he took over as the team's starting after an injury to Dominick Giudice. He played in 11 games that season, making eight starts. In 2025, Crippen started all 13 games and was an honorable mention All-Big Ten selection.

== Professional career ==
Pre-draft measurables
| Height | Weight | Arm length | Hand span | Wingspan | 40-yard dash | 10-yard split | 20-yard split | 20-yard shuttle | Three-cone drill | Vertical jump | Broad jump | Bench press |
|---|---|---|---|---|---|---|---|---|---|---|---|---|
| 6 ft 3 1/2 in (1.92 m) | 301 lb (137 kg) | 31 3/8 in (0.80 m) | 9 1/2 in (0.24 m) | 6 ft 5 in (1.96 m) | 5.44 s | 1.75 s | 3.13 s | 4.72 s | 7.90 s | 28.0 in (0.71 m) | 8 ft 8 in (2.64 m) | 24 reps |
All values from Pro Day

On May 11, 2026, Crippen was signed by the Pittsburgh Steelers as an undrafted free agent after earning a roster spot following a rookie minicamp tryout. On August 28, Crippen was waived by the Steelers.
