= Mark Dalton (All My Children) =

- All My Children character
- Portrayed by: Mark La Mura
- Duration: 1976–1989; 1994–1995; 2004–2005
- First appearance: 1976
- Last appearance: 2005
In-universe information
- Occupation: Plays piano on cruise ship Former Songwriter; Former Music Professor at Pine Valley University
- Family: Kane
- Parents: Eric Kane; Maureen Dalton
- Half-sisters: Erica Kane; Silver Kane
- Wife: Ellen Shepherd (1981–1982, 1988–)
- Daughters: Julie Rand Chandler
- Stepdaughters: Devon Shepherd
- Nephews: Josh Madden (half); Spike Lavery (half great); Ian Slater (half great)
- Nieces: Kendall Hart (half); Bianca Montgomery (half); Miranda Montgomery (half great); Gabrielle Montgomery (half great)

Mark Dalton is a fictional character from the ABC Daytime soap opera, All My Children. He was portrayed by Mark LaMura. He debuted in 1976 and remained a permanent character until 1989 when he left Pine Valley for a job in China. Mark made special guest appearances in 1994, 1995, 2004, and 2005.

Mark Dalton's significant storylines are his failed romance with his half-sister Erica Kane in the 1970s and of substance abuse, including with risks of HIV and AIDS, in the 1980s.

La Mura earned a Daytime Emmy Award nomination in 1988 for Best Supporting Actor.
