= New Monmouth, New Jersey =

Populated place in Monmouth County, New Jersey, US

- Unincorporated community
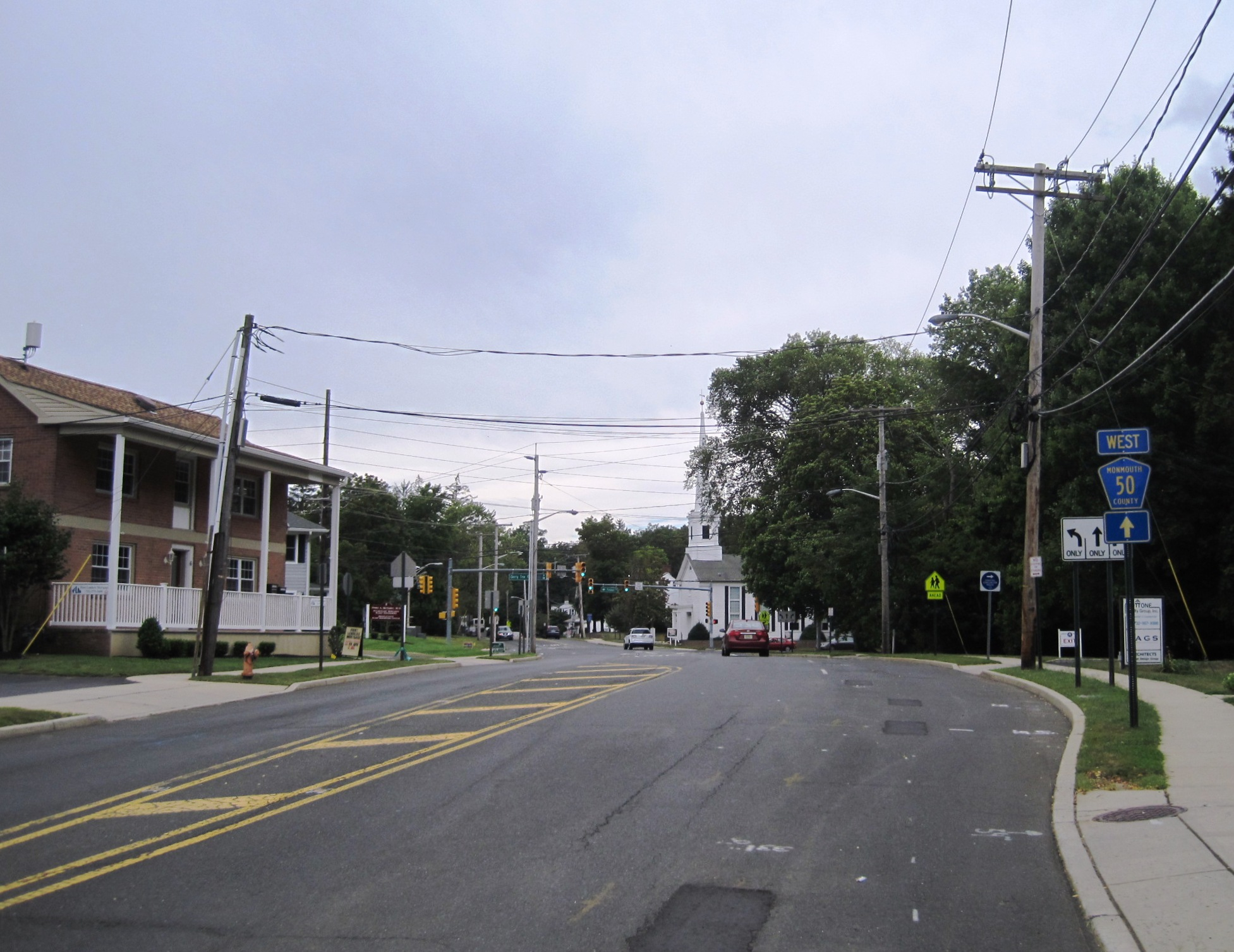

- Location in Monmouth County. Inset: Location of county within the state of New Jersey New Monmouth (New Jersey) New Monmouth (the United States)
- Coordinates: 40°24′43″N 74°06′12″W
- Country: United States
- State: New Jersey
- County: Monmouth
- Township: Middletown
- Elevation: 36 ft (11 m)

Population (2010 census)
  - Total: 28,030
- ZIP Code: 07748
- GNIS feature ID: 882519

New Monmouth is an unincorporated community located within Middletown Township in Monmouth County, in the U.S. state of New Jersey. The area is served as United States Postal Service ZIP Code 07748.

As of the 2010 United States census, the population for ZIP Code Tabulation Area 07748 was 28,030. In the 2000 census, the ZCTA population was 28,689.

The public New Monmouth Elementary School and the parochial Mater Dei High School are located in New Monmouth. Most of the area is suburban, with single-family houses dotting the landscape. The two major roads that pass through New Monmouth are County Route 516 (Cherry Tree Farm Road and Leonardville Road) and New Monmouth Road (CR 50).
