= Brian Angelichio =

American football coach (born 1972)

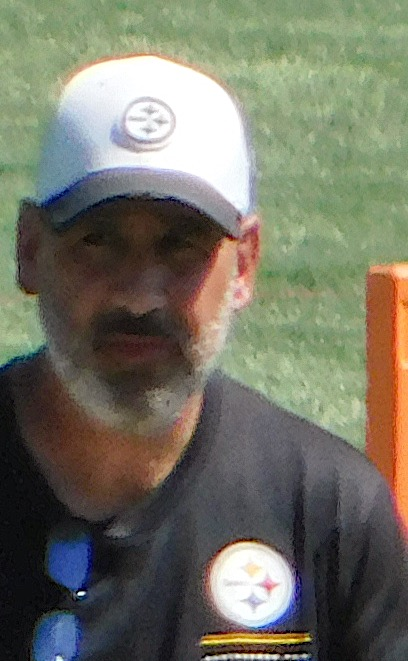
- Angelichio with the Pittsburgh Steelers in 2026

Pittsburgh Steelers
- Title: Offensive coordinator

Personal information
- Born: December 27, 1972 (age 53); Ilion, New York, U.S.

Career information
- College: St. Lawrence (1991–1994)

Career history
- SUNY-Brockport (1995) Secondary coach; Ithaca (1996–2005); Linebackers coach (1996–1997); Wide receivers coach (1998); Offensive line coach (1999); Offensive coordinator & offensive line coach (2000–2005); Pittsburgh (2006–2010); Offensive assistant & tight ends coach (2006); Tight ends coach (2007–2010); Rutgers (2011) Tight ends coach; Tampa Bay Buccaneers (2012–2013) Tight ends coach; Cleveland Browns (2014–2015) Tight ends coach; Green Bay Packers (2016–2018) Tight ends coach; Washington Redskins (2019) Tight ends coach; Carolina Panthers (2020–2021) Tight ends coach; Minnesota Vikings (2022–2025) Passing game coordinator & tight ends coach; Pittsburgh Steelers (2026–present) Offensive coordinator
- Coaching profile at Pro Football Reference

Brian Michael Angelichio (born December 27, 1972) is an American professional football coach who is currently the offensive coordinator for the Pittsburgh Steelers of the National Football League (NFL).

== NFL coaching ==
Angelichio starting his tenure in the NFL coaching tight ends with the Tampa Bay Buccaneers when he came to the NFL from Rutgers with Greg Schiano. He was fired from the Buccaneers the same time as Schiano, leading him to spend two years coaching tight ends for the Cleveland Browns from 2014-2015. This was followed by three years of coaching tight ends for the Green Bay Packers. In 2019, he was not retained by Matt LaFleur and the Packers organization. He would end up spending the 2019 season coaching tight ends for the Washington Redskins. In 2020, it was announced Angelichio would join the Carolina Panthers as the team's tight ends coach. In 2022, Angelichio was hired by Kevin O'Connell to be the passing game coordinator and tight ends coach for the Minnesota Vikings. The two had worked together previously for the Redskins in 2019.

On February 4, 2026, Angelichio was hired as the offensive coordinator for the Pittsburgh Steelers, reuniting him with Mike McCarthy.
