= Eibhlín Ní Chathailriabhaigh =

Irish language activist

- Born: Ellen Colleary; June 1, 1910; Donnybrook, Dublin
- Died: June 7, 2001 (aged 91)
- Occupation: Civil Servant
- Employer: Irish Government
- Known for: Irish activist

Eibhlín Ní Chathailriabhaigh (June 1, 1910 – June 7, 2001) was an Irish speaker and activist in the Irish language movement.

Ní Chathailriabhaigh was born in Donnybrook, Dublin on June 1, 1910, to Michael Colleary and Nora Brodrick. She was one of two girls and had two brothers, one of whom was Seán Colleary, an actor, who married the famous theatre personality Phyllis Ryan in May 1943. Ní Chathailriabhaigh attended Donnybrook Primary School where Irish was taught as an extra class after school hours. She then went on to The Commercial School, Rathmines. She went to work for the Civil Service as a writer. She worked in the Land Commission before being transferred to the Department of Education. She was the first civil servant given a release to go learn Irish in the Gaeltacht when she won a scholarship in 1928.

From 1927 she was a member of Conradh na Gaeilge, teaching Irish classes there. Ní Chathailriabhaigh attended Oireachtas na Gaeilge in 1931 before she was one of the founders of the revived Oireachtas na Gaeilge again in 1939, together with Dónall Ó Dúill, and she later became secretary of the Oireachtas. She was President of the festival in 1971 and chairperson from 1981 to 1986. Ní Chathailriabhaigh was secretary of the National Irish Language Association from the year it was founded 1943–1947. She was also a member of the committee of the Irish Language Drama Association.

Ní Chathailriabhaigh produced a number of plays. One of them won a trophy and was shown on Radio Éireann.

Ní Chathailriabhaigh died on 7 June 2001.
