= Brian Colleary =

American former football coach and college athletics administrator

Playing career
- 1972–1973: Fordham

Coaching career (HC unless noted)
- ?: Blessed Sacrament HS (NY)
- 1979–1983: Iona

Administrative career (AD unless noted)
- 1982–1984: Iona (assistant AD)
- 1984–1985: Iona (associate AD)
- 1985–1989: Marist
- 1989–2005: Duquesne
- 2005–2012: St. John's (sr. associate AD)

Head coaching record
- Overall: 26–21–2

Brian Colleary is an American former football coach and college athletics administrator. He served as the head football coach at Iona College in New Rochelle, New York from 1979 to 1983, compiling a record of 26–21–2. Colleary was the athletic director at Marist College in Poughkeepsie, New York from 1985 to 1989 and Duquesne University in Pittsburgh, Pennsylvania from 1989 to 2005. He graduated from Fordham University in 1974.

== Head coaching record ==
Year	Team	Overall	Conference	Standing	Bowl/playoffs
Iona Gaels (Metropolitan Intercollegiate Conference) (1979–1980)
1979	Iona	6–4	3–2	3rd	
1980	Iona	6–4–1	3–1–1	T–2nd	
Iona Gaels (NCAA Division III independent) (1981–1983)
1981	Iona	5–5			
1982	Iona	5–3–1			
1983	Iona	3–6			
Iona:		26–21–2	6–3–1		
Total:		26–21–2			
