= Uppercross =

Barony in County Dublin, Ireland

Uppercross An Chrois Uachtarach (Irish)
- Barony
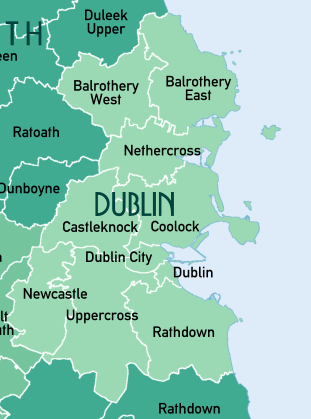
- Barony map of County Dublin, 1900; Uppercross barony is in the south.
- Coordinates: 53°17′13″N 6°20′10″W
- Sovereign state: Ireland
- Province: Leinster
- County: South Dublin, Dún Laoghaire–Rathdown

Area
  - Total: 151.0 km^{2} (58.3 sq mi)

Uppercross (Irish: An Chrois Uachtarach) is a historical barony in southern County Dublin, Ireland.

Baronies were mainly cadastral rather than administrative units. They acquired modest local taxation and spending functions in the 19th century before being superseded by the Local Government (Ireland) Act 1898.

== History ==
The placename derives from "Crosslands" (Latin: Croceae), a term applied to lands that were owned by the Catholic Church. County Dublin's crosslands were divided into two portions, designated Nethercross and Upper Cross. The baronies do not precisely match the old crossland boundaries; for example, Taney was part of the southern crosslands but is now part of Rathdown.

The Uí Ceallaig Cualann ruled Uppercross prior to the Norman invasion. They were cousins to the Uí Máil, both claiming descent from Cellach Cualann (d. AD 715).

== Geography ==
Uppercross is in the south of the county, south of the River Liffey, and containing much of the valley of the River Dodder. It is bound to the south by the County Wicklow border, including Kippure and Seefingaun.

== List of settlements ==
Settlements within the historical barony of Uppercross include:

- Ballyfermot
- Bluebell
- Brittas
- Clondalkin
- Crumlin
- Dolphin's Barn
- Drimnagh
- Firhouse

- Harold's Cross
- Inchicore
- Islandbridge
- Jobstown
- Kilmainham
- Milltown
- Oldbawn
- Palmerstown

- Perrystown
- Ranelagh
- Rathmines
- Tallaght
- Templeogue
- Wilkinstown
