= Ballyboughal =

Village and district in Fingal, County Dublin, Ireland

Ballyboughal Baile Bachaille (Irish)
- Village
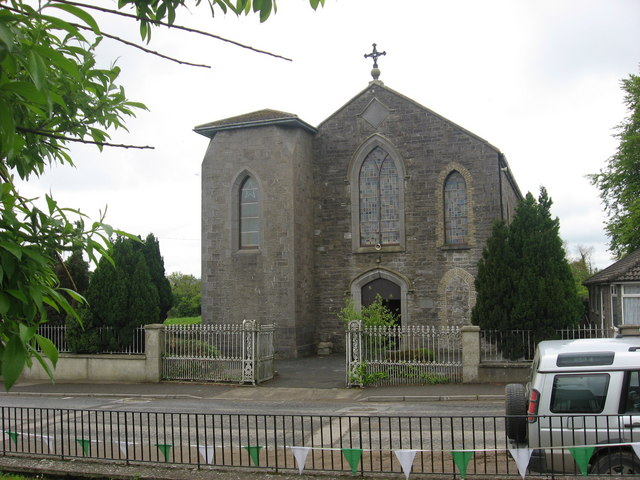
- The Catholic parish church. An inscribed stone high up on the gable reads "THIS TEMPLE was erected to the honour and glory of GOD By the Revd George Canavan P.P. in the year of our Lord 1836"

- Location within Ireland
- Coordinates: 53°31′15″N 6°16′00″W
- Country: Ireland
- Province: Leinster
- County: County Dublin
- Local government area: Fingal
- Elevation: 35 m (115 ft)

Population (2022)
  - Total: 855
- Time zone: UTC±0 (WET)
  - Summer (DST): UTC+1 (IST)
- Eircode routing key: A41
- Telephone area code: +353(0)1
- Irish Grid Reference: O149535

Ballyboughal or Ballyboghil (Irish: Baile Bachaille) is a village and district in central Fingal in County Dublin, near Naul. The name means "the town of the staff", and a major relic, the Bachal Isu, was protected in this area until Strongbow moved it to Christ Church Cathedral, Dublin. It is 4.4 km from Oldtown.

There was a monastery in Ballyboughal sometime before the arrival of the Anglo-Normans.

In addition to the Church of the Assumption, erected in 1836, and which is a chapel of ease for the parish of Naul the medieval church still stands in ruins in the Old Ballyboughal Burial Ground north of the centre of the settlement. It is the place where the Bachal Isu was kept. All the walls stand without the roof, and the building, which has some grave markers on the inside, is divided into a nave and chancel with doors on the north and south sides. The west gable has a triple bell cote, and the east gable has an arched window (without glass) dating from the fourteenth century.

The Ballyboghil or Ballyboughal River flows eastward through the centre of the settlement. It has its source at Tobergregan, south of Garristown, and its mouth at the Rogerstown Estuary.

There is a private family-run airfield, Ballyboughal Airfield, ICAO code EIBB, near the village.

There is a Gaelic Football Club, Ballyboughal GFC, which was founded in 1935 as Ballyboughal Rangers, but the name was changed to the current one when they merged with Fingal Ravens in 1940–41. Hollywood Lakes Golf Club is situated close the village.

== Amenities ==
The local Gaelic Athletic Association (GAA) club is Ballyboughal Gaelic Football Club. Also nearby is Hollywood Lakes Golf Club, an 18-hole parkland golf course. Ballyboughal Airfield is a general aviation airfield supporting local youth and educational groups.

The only primary school in Ballyboughal is Ballyboughal National School.

== See also ==
- List of towns and villages in Ireland
