= Palmerstown (disambiguation) =

Palmerstown is a suburban area of Dublin, Ireland.

Palmerstown may also refer to:

- Palmerstown, Fingal, a civil parish in Ireland
- Palmerstown, Vale of Glamorgan, a district in south Wales
- Palmerstown, U.S.A., a 1980s American TV show

== See also ==
- Palmerston (disambiguation)
