= Clonmethan =

Townland in Fingal (County Dublin), Ireland

Clonmethan Gleann Meáin (Irish)
- Townland
- Location in Dublin
- Coordinates: 53°31′33″N 6°19′45″W
- Country: Ireland
- Province: Leinster
- County: County Dublin
- Local authority: Fingal County Council
- Elevation: 75 m (246 ft)

Clonmethan (Irish: Gleann Meáin; formerly also Clonmelkin, Kilmethan, or Glimmethan) is a townland and a civil parish in the ancient barony of Balrothery West in Fingal, County Dublin, Ireland. It is bordered by the parishes of Palmerstown to the west, Grallagh to the north, Hollywood to the northeast, Westpalstown to the east, Killossery to the southeast, Killsallaghan to the south, and Greenoge, County Meath to the southwest.

== History ==
The parish was historically part of the manor of Swords, which was in the barony of Nethercross, which was formed from those parts of the Liberty of St. Sepulchre outside Dublin city and north of the River Liffey. The prebend of Clonmethan was one of the original thirteen prebends of St Patrick's Cathedral, Dublin. In 1675, the Dublin Castle administration by act of council united four other Church of Ireland parishes into the prebend of Clonmethan: Ballyboghill, Ballymadun, Palmerstown, and Westpalstown. The prebend was in the gift of the Archbishop of Dublin. In 1842 the configuration of the Dublin baronies was simplified and Clonmethan was transferred to the barony of Balrothery West. The Manor Courts Abolition (Ireland) Act 1859 abolished the Manor of Swords.

=== Dalton's account ===
John D'Alton's History of the county of Dublin, published in 1838, describes Clonmethan thus:

Clonmethan ... forms a prebend in St. Patrick's Cathedral, valued at £638 per annum, and paying £5 8s. 1 1/2d. to the First Fruits. Its rectory and vicarage were united in 1675 with the vicarages of Palmerstown, Greenock, Westpalstown, Ballymadun, and Ballyboghill, but Greenock has been latterly severed from the union. The church here is a small, unadorned structure, for the repairs of which the Ecclesiastical Commissioners have granted £175 4s. 11d. It contains no monuments, nor are there any in the surrounding graveyard. Near it is the glebe house, with 55a. of glebe attached to it. In the adjacent Oldtown is a plain Roman Catholic chapel, in the vestry of which a poor school is kept, which is attended by about forty children.

The parish comprises 3027a., 3r., 19p., in ten townlands; the half of this tract belongs to the see of Dublin. The population of the whole was returned in 1821 as 440, and in 1831 as 677, while a later report states that there are not ten Protestants in this census. Rent here varies from £1 5s. to £2 per acre.

The church here was dedicated to the Blessed Virgin, and was one of the thirteen originally granted to St. Patrick's Cathedral by the founder. It is called by Allen a sacerdotal prebend, and is placed by him next after St. Audeon's. To it was subservient the chapel of Fieldstown.

Early in the thirteenth century, the canons of St. Patrick's Cathedral were engaged in two controversies with the prior and canons of Lanthony near Gloucester, in reference to the prebend of Clonmethan. The first concerned the right of burial at Grallagh, which the former claimed as belonging to said prebend, and the latter as appertaining to the church of Hollywood, of which they were rectors. The second difference was about a similar right to the burials in the chapel of St. James's, Palmerstown near Greenock, which the canons of St. Patrick's claimed as an appendage of the prebend of Clonmethan, and the Prior of Lanthony as appertaining to the church of Garristown. Both matters were submitted to the Metropolitan, who determined in the former case that the burials of the chapel of Grallagh should belong to the mother church of Hollywood, but that the vicar should pay four shillings per annum to the Prebendary of Clonmethan. In the latter he decided that the chapel of Palmerstown, Fingal near Greenock, with its burials, should belong to the church of Garristown, but that the prior and convent of Lanthony should pay to the vicar of that chapel four marks yearly; the vicar was moreover to pay a pension of five shillings yearly, at the feast of St. Michael, to the Prebendary of Clonmethan, as a full compensation for any right he might have to the said burial.

In 1216 Pope Innocent the Third confirmed to the see of Dublin, amongst other possessions, Clonmethan with its appurtenances.

In 1306 the prebend was valued at twenty marks, and in 1538 at £28 6s. 9d,

In 1317 the Archbishop of Dublin being seised, in right of his see, (inter alia) of the manor, a carucate, and 111 acres of land in Lusk, 125 acres of land in Clonmethan, &c., obtained a grant of the same for ever, from the crown, reserving services to the king and his successors, on vacancies of the see occurring.

In 1414 Thomas Cranley, Prebendary of Clonmethan, was sued for two-thirds parts of the issues and profits of said prebend for two years, having been an absentee therefrom, but, on production of the king's letters patent licensing his absence, the claim was given up.

In 1475 Nicholas Dowdall, Prebendary of Clonmethan, had license of absence for eight years to enable him to prosecute his studies at Oxford. The Begge family were at this time seised of certain lands here.

At the dissolution Nicholas Lyn was Prebendary of Clonmethan, at which time an inquisition taken stated the possessions of the prebend as one manse and eight acres of land, value 8s; the tithes of the hamlets of Clonmethan, Old-town, Killeene, Cabragh, Morton, Jordanstown, Cotterelstown, Newinnings, Wyanstown, and the fifty acres near Morton, worth per annum (exclusive of the altarages and demesne assigned for the curate at Clonmethan and repair of the chancel) £17 5s. together with the tithes of Fieldstown (exclusive of the altarages and stipend assigned to the curate,) In 1547 the rectory of Clonmethan was leased to John Talbot of Malahide, and by him assigned to Patrick Barnewall of Grace-Dieu for twenty-one years at £21 5s. 4d. annual rent.

In 1560 Alexander Craike, Prebendary of Clonmethan and Dean of St. Patricks, was promoted to the see of Kildare, retaining, however, the deanery of St. Patrick's therewith, "inasmuch As the said bishopric as well in spirituals as temporals, by continual and intolerable oppression of the Irish rebels, is become so small and poor as to be inefficient for keeping of hospitality, and maintaining other charges which the said bishop is obliged to support." In 1561 Walter Hill was prebendary. He was also vicar of Lusk, and contributed largely towards the repair of that church. In 1564 Robert Daly, who had been prebendary of this place, was consecrated Bishop of Kildare, and held this prebend with the vicarage of Swords in commendam. The queen's letter of this year mentions, that he "is well commended to her for his good name and honest living, and the rather because he was well able to preach in the Irish tongue."

The regal visitation book of 1615 states this prebend as of the yearly value of £55, and that Thomas Richmond was then curate here. In 1667 the Archbishop of Dublin had a grant of fifty acres plantation measure here, with various other lands in augmentation of his see; and in 1675 the parishes of Clonmethan, Balmadun, Falmerstown, Grenogue, Westpalstown, and Ballyboghill, were united by act of council.

In 1695 Henry Rider, Bishop of Killaloe, was buried in this church.

In 1697 the Reverend Edmund Murphy was returned as the Roman Catholic pastor of this parish, together with those of Palmerstown, Killsallaghan, and Killester.

In 1716 Archbishop King, by virtue of a power vested in him by act of parliament, granted to the Prebendary of Clonmethan and his successors for ever as a glebe for that parish, the following lands, viz. the five-acre park with garden and cabin adjoining thereto; the two-acre park, and four acres and a half adjoining to the five-acre park, and the rest of Begge's land, being eight acres and a half, all lying near the church of Clonmethan, for which the incumbent was to pay £1 10s. yearly to the archbishop. In 1720 John Grattan, A.M., was installed into this prebend. It was to him Dean Swift bequeathed the silver box, in which the freedom of the city of Dublin had been presented to him, and in which, says the testator, "I desire the said John to keep the tobacco he usually cheweth called pig-tail." The dean also nominated this Mr. Grattan one of his executors. In the same year Doctor Harrison built a glebe house here, and obtained a certificate from the archbishop of having expended thereon £800.

A terrier of 1754 with a map annexed, and lodged in the diocesan registry office, specifies the extent of the rector's glebe here as 34a. 0r. 14p., and his glebe in Ballymadun as 19a. 2r. 5p.

The ecclesiastical report of 1807 notices only the last-mentioned glebe. There was at that time no glebe house, but the Board of First Fruits has since granted £1350 for the erection of one and in 1808 further granted £500 for enlarging the church; but the parish resisted payment of cess therefore, and the question being at issue in the courts of law the church remained unfinished.

The succession of the Prebendaries of Clonmethan was as follows, as far as can be ascertained:—

1275 J. de Nottingham.
1402 Thomas de Everdon
1410 Thomas Cranley
1475 Nicholas Dowdall
1546 Nicholas Lyn
1555 George Browne, removed as Archbishop of Dublin by Queen Mary
1559 Alexander Craike, served as Dean of St. Patrick's, and Bishop of Kildare
1561 Walter Hill, with Lusk
1561 Robert Daly
1615 Nicholas Robinson
1619 William Pulley
1628 Richard Powell
1642 Robert Boyle
1661 John Brereton
1663 John Brereton
1702 Theophilus Harrison
1720 John Grattan
1741 Bryan Robinson
1743 Caleb Cartwright
1763 Patrick Kenny
1789 Robert Baylis Dealtry
1795 Lionel Smythe 5th Viscount Strangford
1801 John Beresford Hill
1803 Storer Charles Littlehales
1811 William Hughes
1813 Thomas Radcliffe
1835 Montague Leaver Short

Near Clonmethan is Wyanstown, an estate also belonging to the see of Dublin.

—

During the reign of James II, the future Catholic Archbishop of Dublin Edward Murphy from Balrothery, was Prebend of Clonmethan in 1688, as Dalton states he returned to serve as Catholic pastor to the area in 1697–1715, while Vicar General of Dublin.

Clonmethan and Fieldstown

Continuing on from Daltons list of Prebends the Rectors/Vicars of Clonmethan were.

- 1841 Robert Quaile Shannon, B.A.
- 1846 R. M. Kennedy, M.A.
- 1848 J. W. LaTouche, LL.D.
- 1870 Robert W. Whelan, M.A.

Clonmethan Union and Garristown

Incumbents

- 1871 James Burnet, A.B.

Clonmethan Union and Hollywood Union

- 1883-18?? - Guy P. L'Estrange A.B.
- 1900-1902 - Thomas Ernest Rudd B.A.
- 1914-1949 - Fredrick Henry Aldhouse, M.A. (1873–1949), served until his death in 1949, the last resident rector, and is buried in the churchyard.

=== St. Mary's Church, Clonmethan ===
The existing structure was built in 1818 with the help of the board of first fruits, and consecrated on August 5, 1821. The Glebe house had been built in 1817. The church closed in 1960 and has fallen into disrepair and no longer has a roof. The Friends of Clonmethan was set up to preserve the church and burial grounds. The chapel of Fieldstown (Glynsurd), which was dedicated to St. Catharine with its small graveyard, was subordinate to Clonmethan, it was in ruins by the 17th century. It was associated with St. Catherine's Well (sometimes called St. Bride's), a holy well, was on the land of Fieldstown House.

=== Modern Prebends of Clonmethan ===
Since the Union with Swords (itself a prebendary of St. Patrick's), the nominal title of Prebend of Clonmethan has been issued to clergy serving in other parishes.

- 1993-2002 - Rev. John Mann, Rector of Cloughfern (Connor)
- 2007–Present - Rev. P. K. McDowell, Rector of Ballywillan (Connor)

== Subdivisions ==
The parish comprises 10 complete townlands (Brownscross, Cabragh, Clonmethan, Fieldstown, Glebe, Killeen, Moortown, Oldtown, Wolganstown, and Wyanstown) and part of an eleventh (Jordanstown). Many of the townlands are named after former proprietors. Clonmethan gives its name to an electoral division in Fingal, comprising six townlands in the parishes of Clonmethan and Palmerstown: Cabragh, Glebe, Jordanstown, Oldtown, Palmerstown, and Whitestown.
