= Pálmason =

Pálmason is an Icelandic patronymic meaning "son of Pálmi".

== People with the name ==
- Finnur Tómas Pálmason (born 2001), Icelandic footballer
- Guðmundur Pálmason (1928–2004), Icelandic chess player
- Hlynur Pálmason (born 1984) is an Icelandic film director
- Pálmi Rafn Pálmason (born 1984), Icelandic footballer
- Sigurður Helgi Pálmason, Icelandic politician

== See also ==
- Palmason Model
- Palmerston
