= Balrothery West =

Balrothery West (Irish: Baile an Ridire Thiar) is one of the baronies of Ireland. Originally part of the Lordship of Meath, it was then constituted as part of the old county of Dublin. Today, it lies in the modern county of Fingal.

The barony of Balrothery was created by Hugh de Lacy, Lord of Meath as his own feudal barony, held directly from himself in capite. His vassals were commonly called "De Lacy's Barons". Balrothery, thus once a feudal title of nobility, was later split into eastern and western divisions.

== Location ==
It is bordered by the baronies of Balrothery East to the west and Nethercross to the south; by the county of Meath to the north and west.

== History ==
The barony was created soon after the Norman invasion of Ireland by Hugh de Lacy, Lord of Meath as his own feudal barony, held directly from himself in capite. His vassals were commonly called "De Lacy's Barons". At the heart of the former barony was the civil parish of Balrothery. The barony was later split into the baronies of Balrothery West and Balrothery East. The village of Balrothery is now located in the neighbouring barony of Balrothery East.

== Civil parishes ==
There are nine civil parishes in the barony: Naul, Westpalstown, Ballyboghil, Garristown, Ballymadun, Palmerstown, Hollywood, Clonmethan, Grallagh. Population centres include Garristown, Naul, Oldtown and Ballyboughil.

== See also ==
List of subdivisions of County Dublin
