= Zoe Romano =

American ultra-distance endurance runner

Zoë Romano is an American ultra-distance endurance runner. Romano is the first and only person ever to run the Tour de France course of 2,000 miles at 30 miles a day, which she ran while the competing cyclists were racing on the course. She was also the first female to run coast-to-coast across the United States unsupported, pushing her gear in a running stroller from Huntington Beach, California, to Charleston, South Carolina.

== Childhood and education ==
A native of Maine, Zoë Romano graduated in 2009 from the University of Richmond in Richmond, Virginia, where she majored in Spanish and International Studies and began her running career. In 2014 she received the Distinguished Recent Graduate Award from the University of Richmond, her alma mater. Zoë is also a writer and currently in an MFA program in creative writing at Queens University of Charlotte, North Carolina, for which she attends summer residencies in South America. She has published in Marathon & Beyond, The Portland Phoenix, and University of Richmond Magazine.

== Ultra-distance challenges ==
Romano began her cross-country run from California. She followed that first big challenge soon after with a smaller ultra marathon. Romano ran the entire Tour de France course in 2013, pushing her gear in a running stroller. She started her 2,000 mile journey on May 18 in Nice and finished in Paris a day before the peloton, covering the course in nine weeks at the rate of 30 miles a day. The course involved climbing more than 100,000 feet of elevation, the equivalent of scaling Mount Everest three times. She was followed on this run by filmmaker Alexander Kreher, who is producing a film about Romano. A trailer for the film is ready, but the film has not yet been released.

"When she took the first steps of her 2,000-mile journey . . ., Zoe Romano wasn't sure she'd ever actually finish. She was buzzing with excitement as she stood at her start line in Cagnes-sur-Mer heading toward Marseille. But she was equally nervous and scared, rightly so for someone who was about to cover the entire Tour de France course on foot."

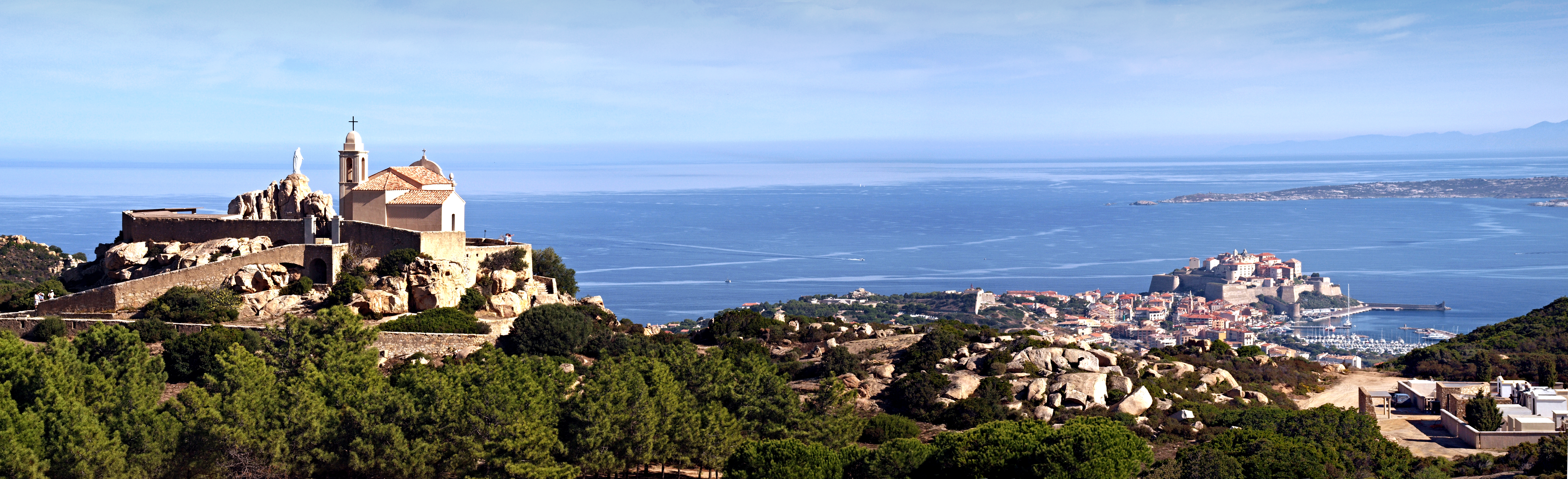
Calvi N-D de La Serra panorama

While standing in Calvi, Haute-Corse, a town on the northwest coast of the island of Corsica, she had finished 79 days of running, logging an average of 30 miles each day, and said, "This just feels surreal because there were so many times I had doubts and felt uncertain. There were times when I could hardly imagine being able to finish on time and in one piece. It feels impossible that it has actually happened."

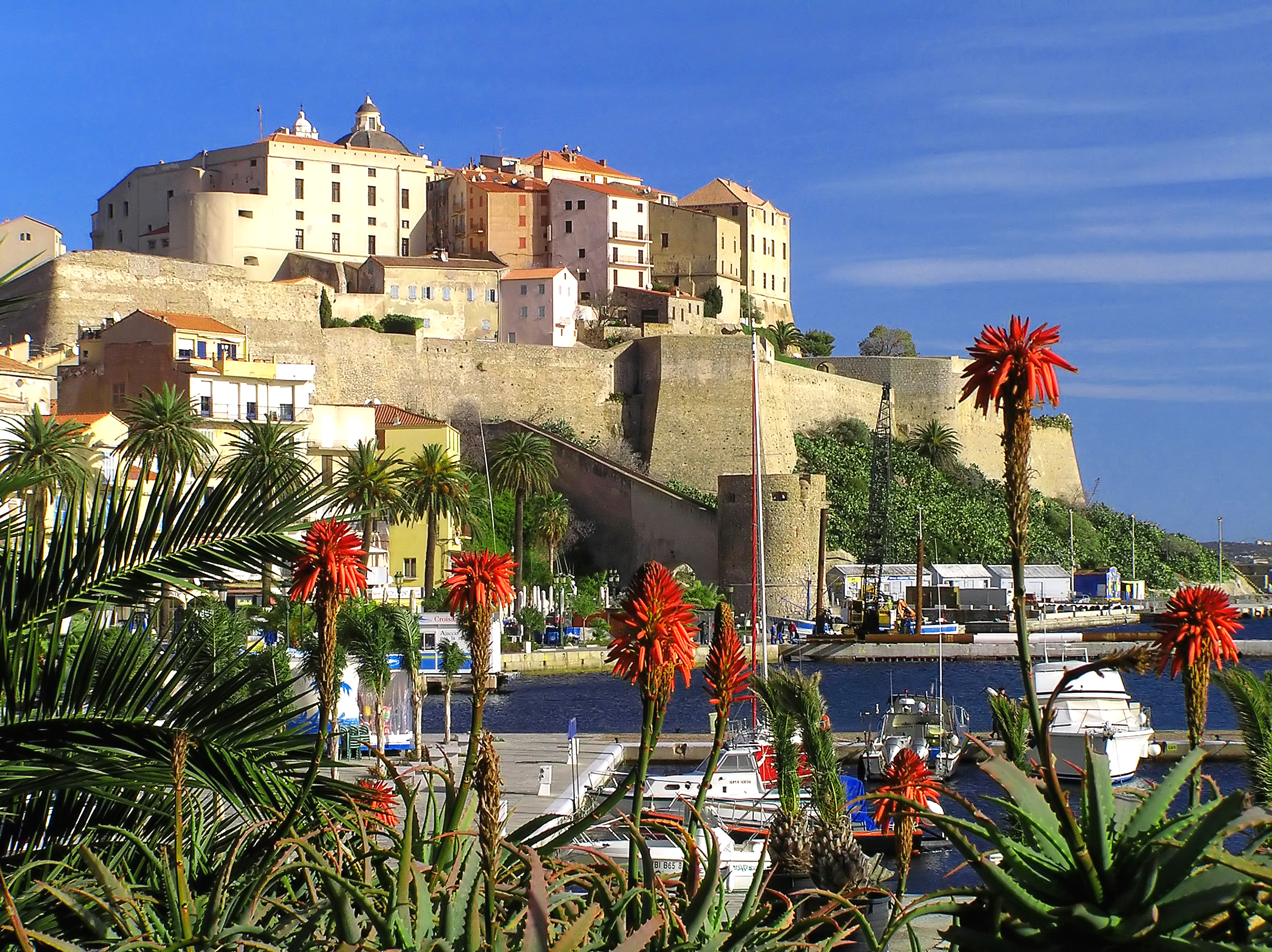
Calvi-Semper fidelis

== Community involvement and charity work ==
While living in Portland, she was a volunteer coach for TED (conference) TEDxDirigo and a Spanish tutor for students of Greater Portland. She is a former ambassador to the Boys & Girls Clubs and has presented inspirational and educational talks to many local running groups, schools, and community initiatives. Zoë received a Key to the City from Mayor Nick Mavodones and had a day of Portland named in her honor. Her fundraising has included work with sponsors and donors to organize giving and cause-marketing campaigns to raise $191,000 for the World Pediatric Project in 2013. She led grassroots efforts to raise $17,000 for Boys & Girls Clubs of America in 2011.

Romano formerly lived in Portland, Maine and in Richmond, Virginia. In 2013 she released her TedxRVA video. She gave an account of her adventure philanthropy at a Grand Prix banquet award ceremony of the Richmond Road Runners Club in 2017. She received an honorarium check from the RRRC for her charities and the next day led an early morning trail run near the James River with members of the club.

She and her accomplishments have been featured on the Today Show, NPR, CNN and in Runner’s World. Romano has been named to Richmond’s “Top 40 Under 40” list and is currently a Rotary Global Scholar.
