= Delvin River =

River in Leinster, Ireland

Coordinates: 53°38′N 6°13′W

River Delvin
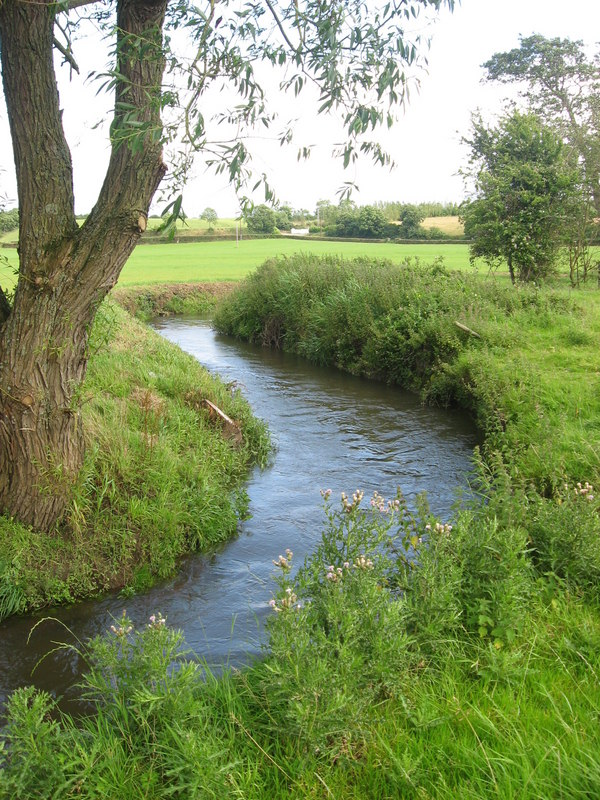
- At Gibblockstown, County Meath
- Etymology: Old Irish ailbine, supposedly from ollbine, "great crime"
- Native name: An Ailbhine

Physical characteristics
- Source
  - location: near Garristown, County Dublin (Fingal)
  - elevation: 120 m (390 ft)
- Mouth
  - location: Knocknagin, to the Irish Sea (County Dublin)
- Length: 18 km (11 mi)

Basin features
- Tributaries
  - left: Bartramstown River, Saddlestown Stream, Silver Stream
  - right: Garristown Stream

The River Delvin (Irish: An Ailbhine) is a river of northern County Dublin, about 18 kilometres (11 mi) long and forming much of the Dublin-Meath boundary; it is thus largely under the responsibility of Fingal County Council, sometimes shared with Meath County Council.

== Name ==
Delvin or An Ailbhine is derived from Old Irish ailbine, possibly from ollbine, that is "great crime." The river is also sometimes known as the Elvene, Elvin Water, Elvin or Delvyn.

== Course ==
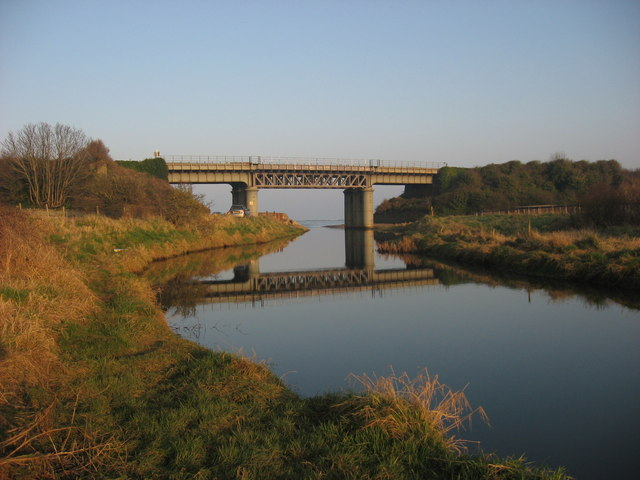
Railway bridge across the River Delvin near its mouth

The Delvin rises north west of the village of Garristown, and receives the Bartramstown River, which rises in County Meath and passes near the Fourknocks Passage Tomb. The Delvin passes Garristown, from which the Garristown Stream joins, and flows northeast, forming much of the Dublin–Meath county boundary. It passes along the northern edge of the village of Naul, where there are cliffs of around 20 metres, a 5-metre natural fall, and a small private hydro-electric plant on an artificial cascade. The river near Naul is sometimes known as "The Roche".

Downstream of Naul, small tributaries flow in. The river runs east, then north, passing Stamullen, then east again, crossing into the broad Gormanston area. It passes under the M1 motorway, where it marks the county boundary, and later receives a final tributary and flows under a viaduct to enter the Irish Sea at Knocknagin, at the southern end of Gormanston beach, south of Ben Head and some distance north of the village of Bremore, and the town of Balbriggan.

The Delvin has more than a dozen tributaries, including the Bartramstown River, Stablestown Stream, and Silver Stream. It once powered at least one mill, and today there is at least one small hydroelectric plant on its course. The main river body runs for about 18 km, while tributary lines total at least 10 km more.

== Fishing ==
Trout fishing on this river is from march 3rd to august 31st ,contact Gormanston district angling club for permits .most trout are 1/2lb or less with occasional 1lb+ in the deeper pools .

== See also ==
Rivers of Ireland
