= Knockbrack (disambiguation) =

Knockbrack is a 608 m (1,995 ft) mountain in Ireland, near Mangerton Mountain, County Kerry

Knockbrack may also refer to:

- Knockbrack (Dublin), 176 m (577 ft) summit in the Naul Hills, County Dublin
- Knockbrack (Galway), a 442 m (1,450 ft) subsidiary summit of Ben Brack, County Galway
- Knockbrack, a 459 m (1,506 ft) summit in the Slieve Mish Mountains, County Kerry
- Knockbrack East, County Kerry, a townland
- Knockbrack West, County Kerry, a townland
