= Dunne v Director of Public Prosecutions =

Irish Supreme Court case

- Coat of arms of Ireland
- Court: Supreme Court of Ireland
- Decided: 25 April 2002
- Citation: [2002] IESC 27

Case history
- Appealed from: Judgment of Geoghegan J (High Court) 29 July 1999
- Appealed to: Supreme Court

Court membership
- Judges sitting: McGuinness J, Hardiman J, Fennelly J

Case opinions
- Decision by: McGuinness and Hardiman JJ
- Dissent: Fennelly J

Keywords
- Evidence, Risk of unfair trial, Duty of An Garda Síochána, Prohibition, Delay in seeking evidence

Dunne v Director of Public Prosecutions, [2002] 2 IR 305; [2002] IESC 27; [2002] 2 ILRM 241, is a reported Irish Supreme Court case in which the Court held that fair procedure imposes a duty on the prosecution to seek out and preserve all evidence that has a bearing or a potential bearing on the issue of guilt or innocence.

== Background ==
The case centered on the robbery of the Parkway Filling Station in Palmerstown on 18 January 1998. The applicant, Robert Dunne, was charged with the robbery. Brian Torley, the owner of the filling station stated that the filling station was covered by video camera surveillance. Torley failed to recall whether the Gardaí requested or obtained video tapes of the robbery. The officer in charge of the investigation, Detective Garda Denis Kenny, admitted that no video tape of the events that occurred at the Parkway Filling Station was given to or obtained by any member of the Garda Síochana.

The only evidence presented against the applicant was an alleged written statement. It was argued that the failure to preserve the video recording for the applicant to view should be considered a breach of Garda obligation to preserve evidence potentially relevant to the issue of the guilt or innocence of the applicant. Arguing in favor of refusing the relief sought, the Director of Public Prosecutions (DPP) stated Dunne had been guilty of delay in seeking judicial review.

== Supreme Court Decision ==
The Supreme Court granted the appeal and subsequently made an order of prohibition. It was held that:

1. An accused person had a constitutional right to a fair trial
2. The applicant had not delayed in seeking the videos
3. It was the duty of the Gardaí to seek out and preserve all evidence having a bearing or potential bearing on the issue of guilt or innocence

In his judgment, Hardiman J referred to his prior ruling in Braddish v DPP where he initially stated:

"It is the duty of the Gardai, arising from their unique investigative role, to seek out and preserve all evidence having a bearing or potential bearing on the issue of guilt or innocence."

As there was no evidence that the Gardaí ever possessed the video tapes alleging to show to accused committing the robbery in question, there could not be a question of a failure to preserve that evidence. The most important aspect to consider was whether the Gardaí had failed in their duty to "seek out" evidence which had "a bearing or potential bearing on the issue of guilt or innocence."

Endorsing the use of new technology in efforts to prevent crime, Hardiman J. noted that science and technology can provide more certainty in important matters that should not be merely judged by humans. He pointed towards the repeated use of new technology in furthering the prevention of crime for the greater good, even when the processes involved can be seen to be somewhat intrusive to innocent people.

=== Concurrences ===
In his concurrence, McGuinness J stated that:

"Where the court was asked to prohibit a trial on the grounds that there was an alleged failure to seek out evidence, it would have to be shown that any such evidence would be clearly relevant, that there was at least a strong probability that the evidence was available and that it would in reality have a bearing on the guilt or innocence of the accused person."

=== Dissents ===
Fennelly J, dissenting in part, noted his concerns on imposing such a duty on Gardaí in relation to seeking out evidence. It represents a "very significant new step in the law" and that there is a danger that "there will develop a tendency to shift the focus of criminal prosecution on to the adequacy of the police investigation rather than the guilt or innocence of the accused."

Referring to the judgment of Hardiman J in Braddish v DPP it was reiterated that such a duty:

"Cannot be interpreted as requiring the Gardaí to engage in a disproportionate commitment of manpower or resources in an exhaustive search for every conceivable kind of evidence. The duty must be interpreted realistically on the facts of each case."

== Subsequent Developments ==
The ruling in this case was later affirmed in the 2003 Supreme Court case of Bowes v DPP. Its judgments were also followed in O'Brien v DPP and DPP v Browne.
