= Simon McKinley =

Irish racing driver

- Nationality: Irish
- Born: 3 April 1981 Naul, County Meath, Ireland
- Died: 25 April 2015 (aged 34) The Burren, County Clare, Ireland

Irish Hillclimb and Sprint Championship
- Wins: 4-time Irish Hillclimb and Sprint Champion

Simon McKinley (3 April 1981 - 25 April 2015) was an Irish racing driver and four-time Irish Hillclimb and Sprint Champion.

== Career ==
McKinley was from Naul, Ireland. He famously competed in a white 1980 Mk2 Ford Escort, which he began building with his father, Peter, at age 13, as well as the Lant RT4. He was the four-time winner of the Irish Hillclimb and Sprint Championship, and was reigning champion at the time of his death in 2015.

== Death ==
On 25 April 2015, McKinley was killed during the Clare Motor Club Annual Hillclimb, at an event held on Scalp Hill between Carran and Bellharbour in The Burren, County Clare, Ireland. The incident occurred during McKinley's final hillclimb run of the day around 5:30pm. His Lant RT4 lost control, and he collided with a stone cliff at 140 miles per hour. McKinley was brought to University Hospital Limerick, where he was pronounced dead.

== Personal life ==
He married Deirdre McKinley in 2012, and had a son Rory in 2014. Their family was dubbed, "Ireland’s fastest family" as Deirdre was one of the highest-ranking female motorists in the world, having placed third in the FIA International Hillclimb Masters in 2014.
