= Inventory of Church Property =

Record-keeping process

An inventory of church property is a process that is carried out periodically, or when there is a new ecclesiastical officeholder. In the Church of England the inventory is known as a terrier, from glebe terrier.

== Description ==
Within the Catholic Church, the inventory was significant to bishops and abbots in the Middle Ages, as they were often of noble birth and so would often have both property and recognised heirs. Under the Council of Trent, inventories were required of substantial officeholders on an annual basis, and were not to be self-administered, similar to modern company audits.

Canon law before the Council of Trent made no clear mention of the need for church inventories, although bishops were ordered to separate carefully their own property from that of their church office so that the bishop's heirs could not seize the church's goods, or the Church lay claim to the bishop's personal goods.

The most important document relating to the inventories of church property is the motu proprio "Provida", by Pope Sixtus V in 1587. Its original purpose was to establish a general ecclesiastical record office at Rome to store the inventories of all the church property in Italy. This goal was abandoned, as these inventories already existed in many episcopal archives, with bishops verifying the inventories during their pastoral visits. However, Sixtus still commanded all other bishops to create an inventory of the property of all the churches and ecclesiastical establishments within their dioceses.

This command was renewed by Pope Benedict XIII in 1725 and Pius X in 1904.

The expectation is that on assuming office, every administrator of church property must draw up an exact inventory of property from his office, with one copy sent to his archives, and the other to the relevant bishop (in some countries a third copy is sent to the civil authorities). When the term of office ends, the officeholder must hand over to his successor all articles entered in the inventory. This verification is done in a document which discharges the retiring official and places the responsibility on his successor. During the period of management the administrator must keep the inventory up to date, that is to say, he must make a record, with due legal formalities, of any changes to the inventory. A bishop is often expected to examine the inventory during visits.

The rise of financial reporting has meant that in many cases this is done through the production and often external auditing of church accounts. Although bishops still have a role within the Catholic Church as guardians of church assets, the role of episcopal visits and inventories are not as important, but may still be a symbolic part of an officeholder's induction.
