= Palmerston =

Palmerston may refer to:

== People ==
- Christie Palmerston (c. 1851–1897), Australian explorer
- Several prominent people have borne the title of Viscount Palmerston
  - Henry Temple, 1st Viscount Palmerston (c. 1673–1757), Irish nobleman and British politician
  - Henry Temple, 2nd Viscount Palmerston (1739–1802), British politician
  - Henry John Temple, 3rd Viscount Palmerston (1784–1865), British foreign minister and Prime Minister
- Charles P. Anderson (1865–1930), Canadian bishop

== Places ==
=== Australia ===
==== Australian Capital Territory ====
- Palmerston, Australian Capital Territory, a suburb of Canberra, Australia

==== Northern Territory ====
- County of Palmerston, a cadastral division
- Palmerston, the name used for Darwin prior to 1911
- Palmerston, Northern Territory, a city near Darwin
  - The City of Palmerston, a local government area

==== Queensland ====
- Palmerston, Queensland, a locality in the Cassowary Coast Region
- East Palmerston, Queensland, a locality in the Cassowary Coast Region
- Cape Palmerston National Park
- Palmerston Highway, connects Cassowary Coast Region with Tablelands Region

=== Canada ===
- Palmerston, Ontario, a town in Ontario
- Mount Palmerston on Vancouver Island, British Columbia
- Palmerston Boulevard, a notable residential street in the city of Toronto, Ontario
- Palmerston Lake, a lake located in North Frontenac Township, Ontario

=== Ireland ===
- Palmerston, County Mayo, in Ireland
- Palmerston Park, Dublin, Ireland, a park and suburb near Rathmines

=== New Zealand ===
- Palmerston, New Zealand, a town in the Otago Region of the South Island
- Palmerston North, a city in the Manawatū-Wanganui Region of the North Island

=== Elsewhere ===
- Palmerston, Mutare, a suburb of Mutare, Zimbabwe
- Palmerston Island, an island in the Cook Islands
- Palmerston Park, home ground of Queen of the South F.C. in Dumfries, Scotland

== Other uses ==
- Palmerston (car), a British car manufactured during the 1920s
- Palmerston (cat) (2014–2026), a mouser in the Foreign and Commonwealth Office at Whitehall, London
- Palmerston FC, an Australian association football team
- Palmerston Football Club, an Australian Aussie Rules team
- Palmerston Forts, also known as Palmerston's Follies, a series of 19th-century British defensive fortifications

== See also ==
- Palmerstown (disambiguation)
- Pálmason
