= Alexander Craike =

16th-century Scottish priest

Alexander Craike, B.D. was a 16th-century Scottish priest.

Craike was a Scotsman. He was appointed Prebendary of Clonmethan in St. Patrick's Cathedral, Dublin in 1559; its Dean on 21 August 1560; and Bishop of Kildare the next day. He died in 1564.
