= Honorarium =

Payment made when not set or required

An honorarium is an ex gratia payment, i.e., a payment made, without the giver recognizing themself as having any liability or legal obligation to the recipient for their volunteered services, or for services for which fees are not traditionally required. It is a common remuneration practice in schools or sports clubs, for teachers and coaches. Another example includes the payment to guest speakers at a conference meeting to cover their travel, accommodation, or preparation time. Services for funerals and/or memorial services are often paid by honorarium, as the clergy and other people such as musicians who commonly have roles at these events, out of care, do not have a set fee for services to grieving families. Likewise, wedding officiants are sometimes paid through honorarium. When required, honorariums may be termed altarages, although an altarage may be paid to a church or parish rather than a person.

== Taxation ==
=== Australia ===
An example of this is the payments made by Australian schools to their sporting coaches. They are ostensibly receiving a reimbursement for their costs in their voluntary roles as coaches. The concept of an honorarium has a tax implication. In Australia, recipients of these funds make a tax declaration (known as the hobbyist form) to the tax office and therefore do not have to include this money in their annual tax return.

=== Canada ===
In Canada, honoraria are considered salary and thus, taxable income under the Income Tax Act. In the case where a gift is substituted for honorarium (gift in lieu of money), it is still classified as a taxable benefit by Canada Revenue Agency.

In cases where an honorarium is paid to an individual who is not a resident of Canada, the honorarium is still subjected to income tax withholding (usually 15%) unless prior approval was obtained from Revenue Canada.

=== Hong Kong ===
Honoraria are subjected to taxation under HK Laws. Chap 112 Inland Revenue Ordinance and also subjected to the Mandatory Provident Fund, a compulsory saving scheme for retirement.

=== Indonesia ===
Under Indonesian National Laws, honorarium recipients are subjected to withholding tax under Income Tax Article 21.

=== New Zealand ===
When honorarium is paid to an employee, such as mayors, chairpersons, and local clubs and societies, it is not subject to withholding tax but is subject to income tax. However, if the payment was not made to the above-mentioned category of people, it is subject to withholding tax rate between 33c to 48c.

=== Sri Lanka ===
In Sri Lanka, remuneration received by Government Ministers and Members of Parliament (MPs) are considered by the President as Honoraria. As such deemed by him to be not subject to PAYE as MPs have honorific before their names as such receive honorariums and not salaries from the State.

=== United Kingdom ===
Honoraria to employees are subject to Income Tax and National Insurance contributions under PAYE. However payments are made based on services required and not bound by any contractual arrangements.

The British spy agencies euphemistically call a bribe an "Honorarium" or "King George's cavalry".

=== United States ===
An honorarium paid to a U.S. resident for services performed within or outside the U.S. is subject to federal (and in some cases state) income tax.

Members of the United States Congress are prohibited by law from accepting honoraria for things such as speeches or articles.

== See also ==
- Gift
- Tip (gratuity)
- Stipend
