= Fourknocks Passage Tomb =

Passage grave in County Meath, Ireland

- Tuama Pasáiste na bhFuarchnoc
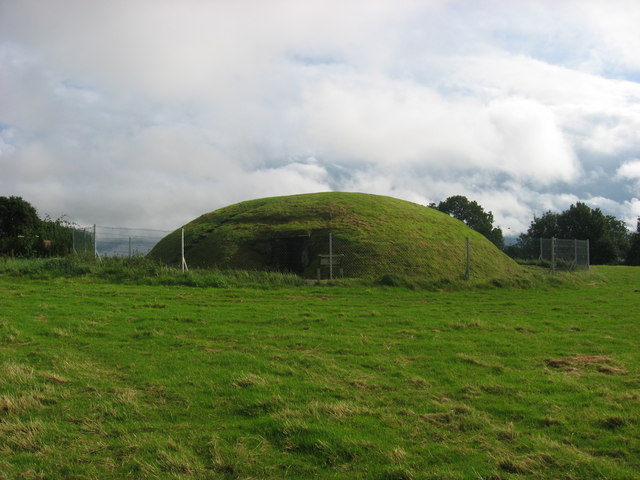
- The passage grave in 2007

- Location in Ireland
- 53.596583°N 6.326479°W
- Type: Passage grave
- Location: Fourknocks, Stamullen, County Meath, Ireland

History
- Built: c. 2750 BC

Site notes
- Material: Stone
- Elevation: 149 m (489 ft)
- Area: Delvin Valley
- Discovered: 1949

National monument of Ireland
- Official name: Fourknocks Passage Tomb
- Reference no.: 472

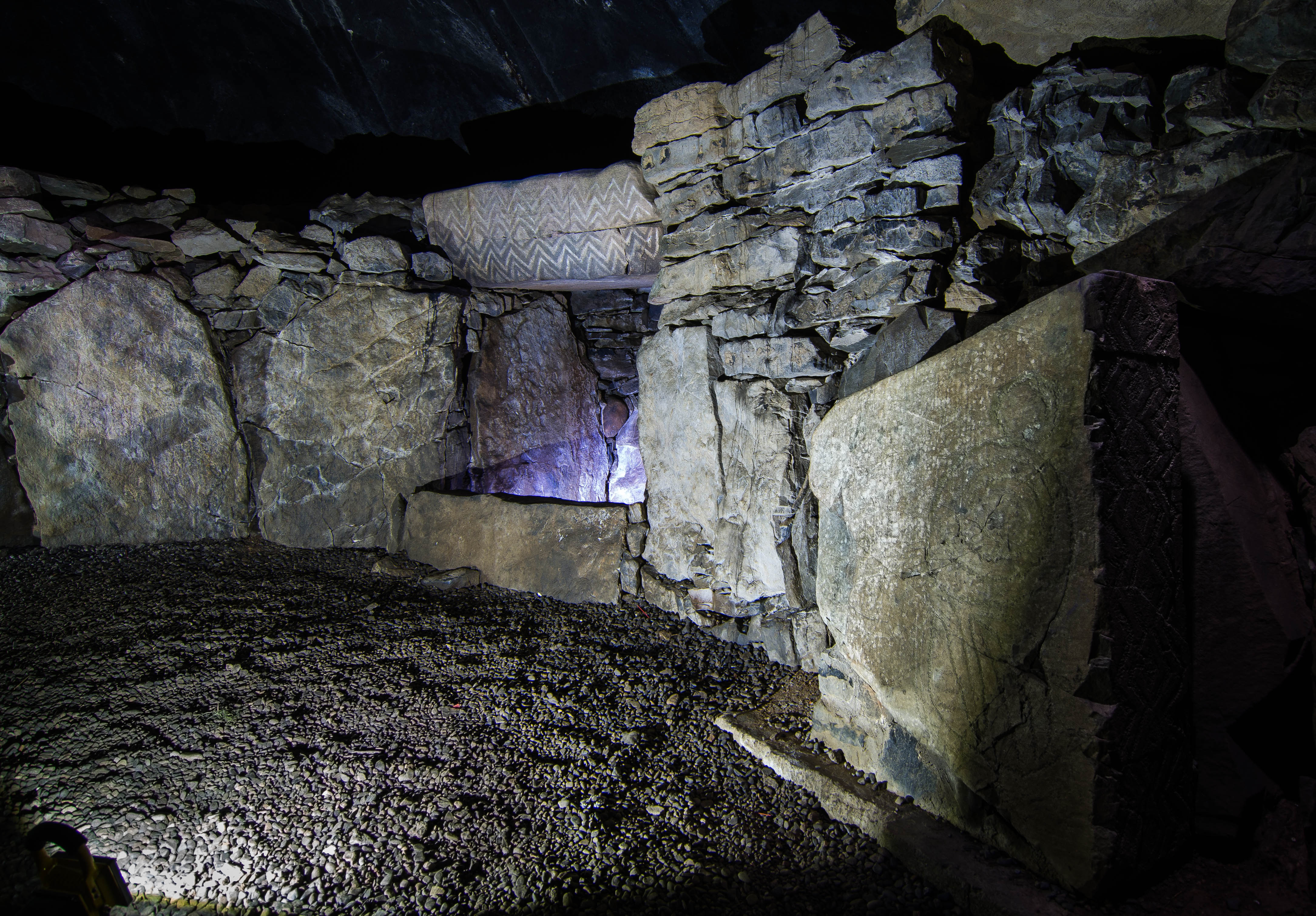
Western recess

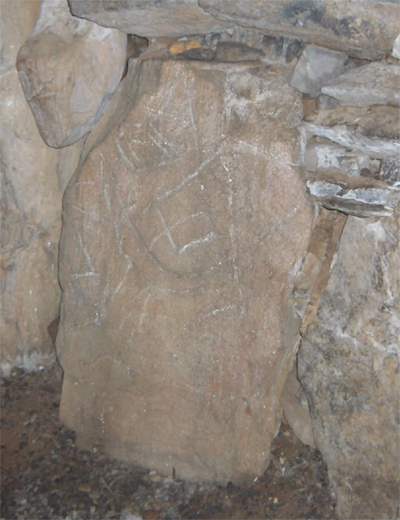
Carved stone, believed to represent a face

Fourknocks Passage Tomb is a passage grave and National Monument located in County Meath, Ireland.

== Location ==
is located 2.7 km (1.7 mi) northwest of Naul, near a hilltop overlooking the Delvin River. The placename means either "cold hill" or "bare/exposed hill."

== History ==
Fourknocks Passage Tomb dates to 3000–2500 BC.

It was unknown to archaeology until 1949, when a woman making a visit to Newgrange mentioned, "there are mounds like this on my uncle’s farm." It is not marked on any of the old Ordnance Survey maps. It was first excavated from 1950 to 1952 by PJ Hartnett. He found cists, grave goods including a foot bowl and a carved antler pin, urns containing cremated remains and a posthole. Unlike other passage graves, the tomb at Fourknocks is not believed to have been covered over with stones. A wooden pole may have held up a wooden or animal-skin roof.

During reconstruction after excavation, a concrete roof was placed over the chamber for protection.

== Description ==
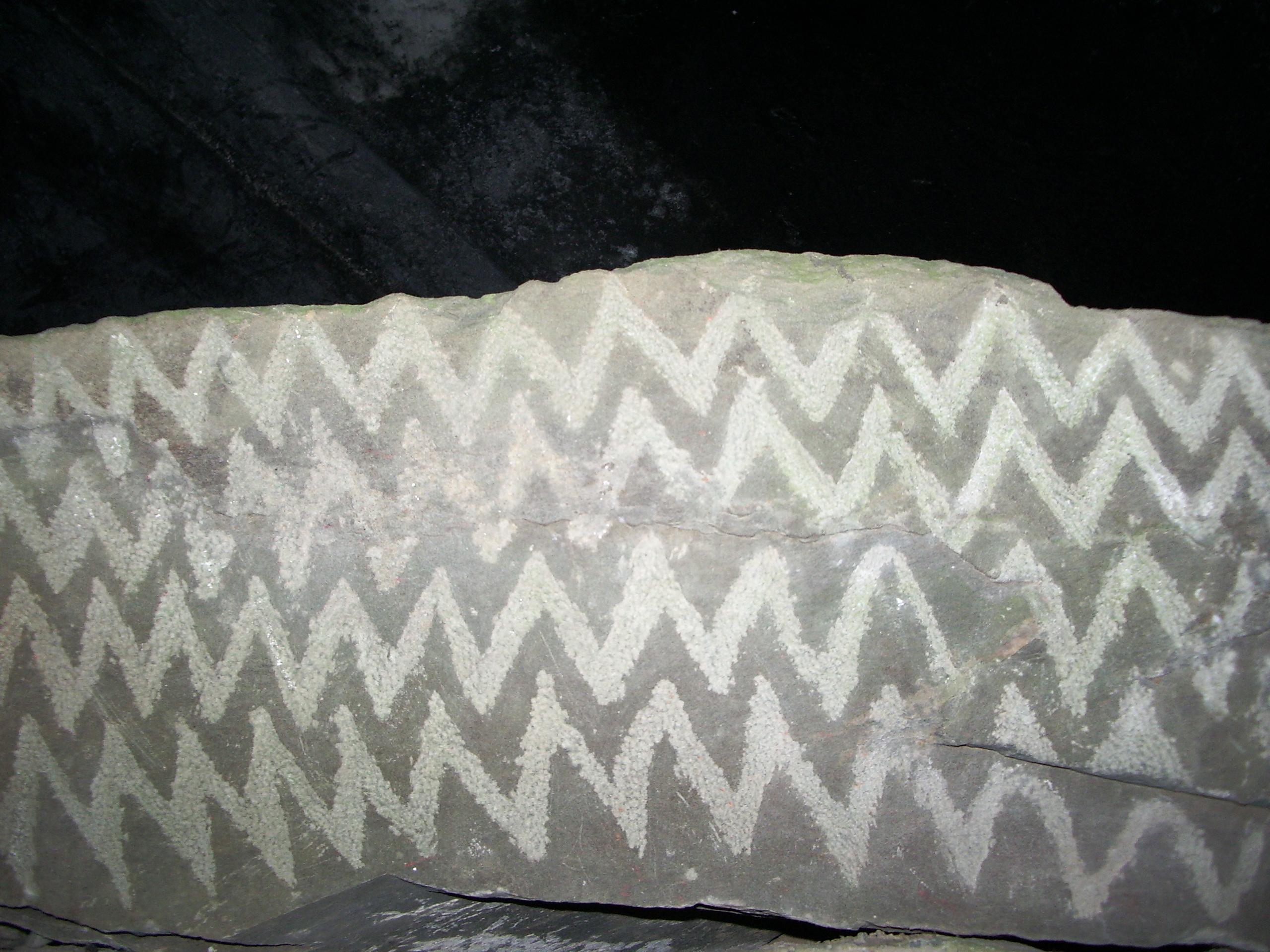
Carved stone at Fourknocks

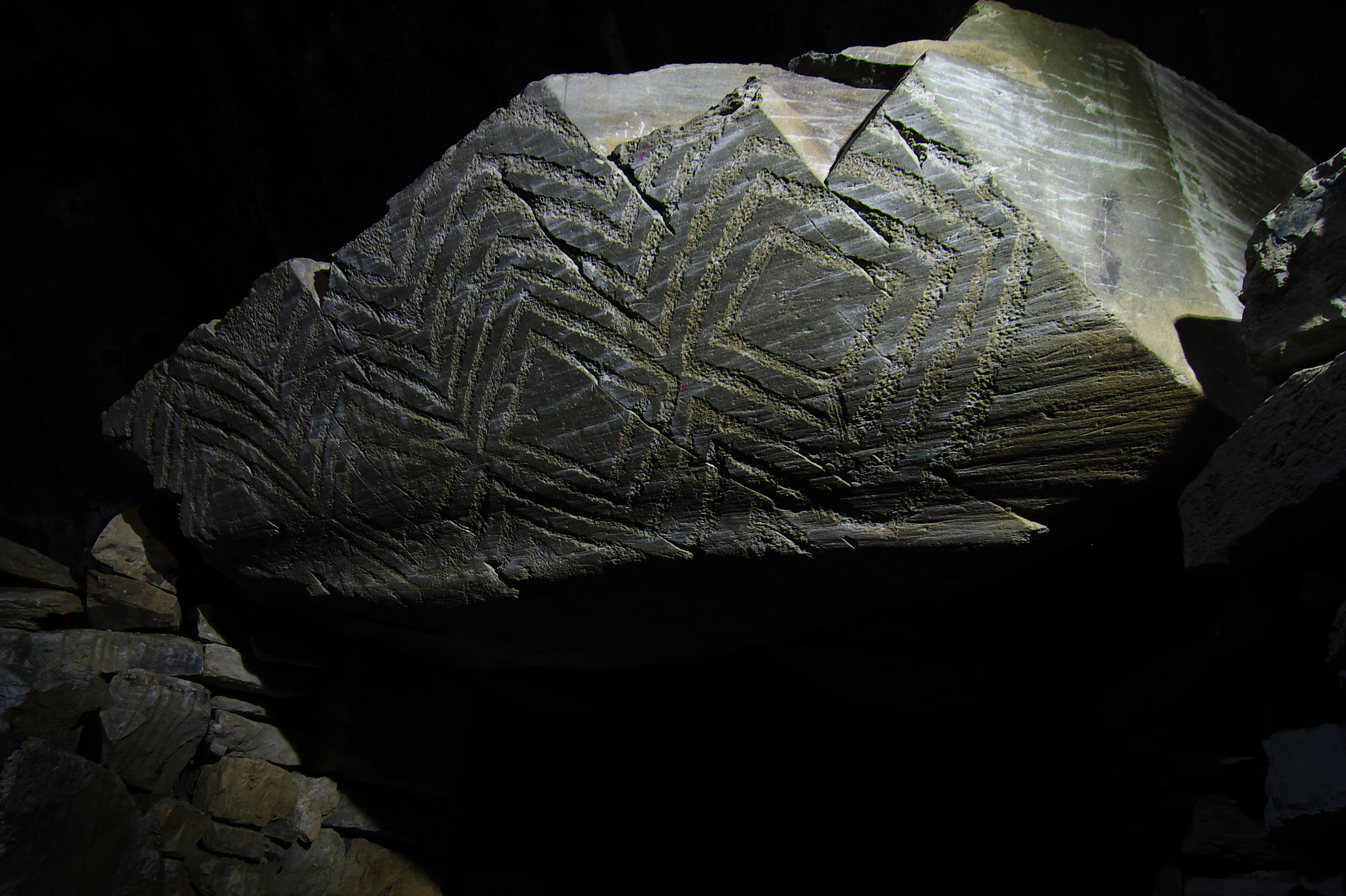
Southern lintel

Fourknocks has a 17 foot long passage leading into a wide, pear-shaped chamber (18 X 21 ft) with three smaller offset chambers. Fourknocks has a strong similarity to Cairn L at Loughcrew. The original roof was likely a wooden structure supported by a central pole.

Two of the lintels have chevron decoration and one of them has lozenge decoration.

Two other mounds in the Fourknocks complex were excavated. One of these likely served as the cremation site for the bones found in the main tomb and was used for later interments.
