= Theophilus Harrison =

Anglican priest in Ireland

Theophilus Harrison was an Anglican priest in Ireland during the late 17th and early 18th centuries.

Harrison was educated at Trinity College, Dublin. He was appointed the incumbent of St John, Dublin, in 1696; a prebendary of Christ Church Cathedral, Dublin in 1696; Dean of Clonmacnoise in 1697; and then Clonmethan, Co. Dublin, a prebendary of St Patrick's Cathedral, Dublin in 1702. He died in 1720.
