= Palmason Model =

The Palmason model is a depth, distance, temperature and heat flow gradient model of crustal accretion mechanism through the Iceland lithosphere which denotes the spreading material trajectories from a rift axis. The material erupting at the rift axis will tend to sink down, due to thermal subsidence and spreading, to a depth of many kilometers, while lava flows spreading to a distance of many kilometers away from the rift axis on the surface will sink down to shallower depth. Surface erosion can expose such preserved materials.

The model was developed in the 1970s and 80s by Guðmundur Pálmason (1928–2004), once one of Iceland's best chess players. The name given to the model, however, misrepresents Icelandic naming conventions; Pálmason is a patronymic, not a surname, and in Iceland he would have properly been referred to by his given first name, Guðmundur.
