= Oldtown, County Dublin =

Village in County Dublin, Ireland

Oldtown An tSeanbhaile (Irish)
- Village
- Location in Ireland
- Coordinates: 53°31′27″N 6°18′58″W
- Country: Ireland
- Province: Leinster
- County: County Dublin
- Local government area: Fingal
- Elevation: 63 m (207 ft)

Population (2022)
  - Urban: 523
- Time zone: UTC+0 (WET)
  - Summer (DST): UTC-1 (IST (WEST))
- Eircode (Routing Key): A45
- Irish Grid Reference: O115540

Oldtown (Irish: An tSeanbhaile) is a population centre and townland in County Dublin, Ireland. The R122 road runs through the village linking Balbriggan and Naul to St Margaret's and Dublin Airport. It is in the civil parish of Clonmethan and the local government area of Fingal.

== Physical features ==
The character of the landscape is Low-Lying Agricultural, as indicated in the County Development Plan. This area contains mixed pasture and arable farming on low lands, consisting of large fields with few tree belts or large settlements.

The village itself is situated in a shallow valley drained by a small river known locally as The Daws River and is surrounded by lands zoned as agricultural in the 1999 Fingal County Development Plan. It is the policy of the council to protect and provide for the development of agriculture and rural amenity within this zone.

== History ==
Oldtown is an example of a "chapel village", which led to widespread investment in chapel building following the re-emergence of institutional Catholicism in the late eighteenth century.

The original chapel, which was built in 1827, became the focal point of the village and attracted a range of other services such as the national school, community hall, priest's house, shop, public house and forge. The term "chapel villages" has been coined for settlements which evolved in association with the growing social and cultural importance of the Catholic Church in Irish society.

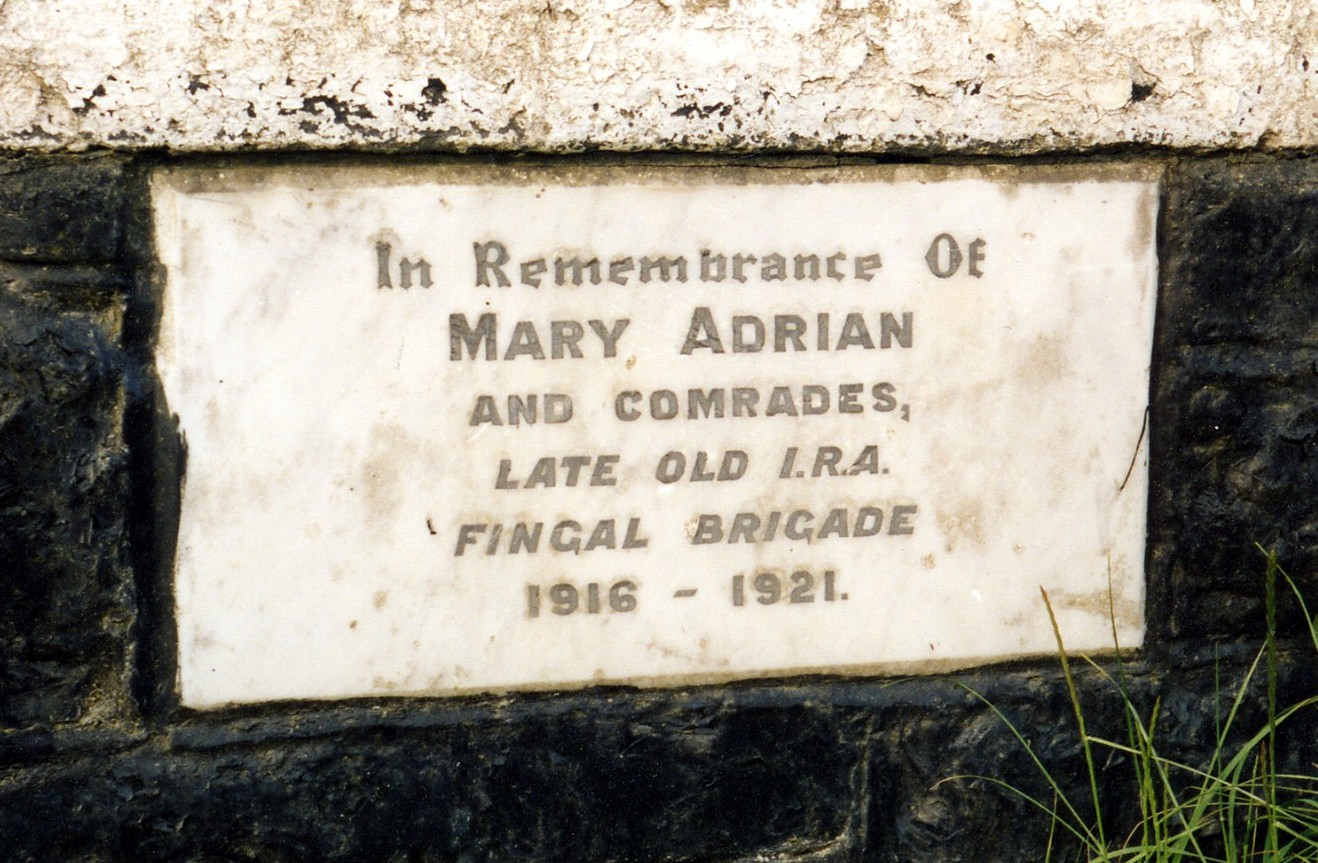
Commemoration plaque on the bridge in Oldtown

The Parliamentary Gazette of Ireland 1843–44 states that the population of Oldtown in 1841 was 156, and 27 houses were located within the village area of 10 acres (40,000 m^{2}). After the Great Famine of 1848 the census of 1851 states the population of the village as recorded as 32 people.

Molly Weston, a heroine of the 1798 rebellion, was born near Oldtown. She fought alongside her three brothers at Tara. A memorial was erected to her memory at Oldtown during the 1798 Bi-Centennial in 1998. "Arrayed in green... mounted on a white horse, [she] rode hither and thither upon the field with drawn sword in hand, rallying the pikemen and leading them in successive charges with the utmost fearlessness" (Patrick Archer, Fingal in 1798). She wore a green riding costume, with gold braid in the manner of a uniform and a green cocked hat with a white plume. She was armed with sword and pistols and was accompanied by her four brothers when she rode into battle. Weston rallied and regrouped the stricken pikemen; she placed herself at their head and led repeated charges against the Reagh Fencibles. "She fired a big gun captured from the Fencibles during the battle, killing eleven of their number. Molly died along with her four brothers at the Battle of Tara. Her side-saddle was recovered from the battlefield.

Oldtown was the first town in the State to benefit from the rural electrification scheme run by the Electricity Supply Board (ESB) from 1946 to 1979. The first electricity pole was ceremoniously erected in November 1946 at Kilsallaghan, and the first switch-on was in Oldtown itself, in January 1947. The 50th anniversary of the event was commemorated in the village, with the ESB hosting a dinner to which families living in the area since 1946 were invited.

In the winter of 1981/1982, a large snowstorm cut off the village for five days, with the Air Corps eventually flying in supplies such as food and medicine via helicopter to relieve the village.

== Modern development ==
Oldtown
Year	Pop.	±%
2002	162	—
2006	220	+35.8%
2011	455	+106.8%
2016	497	+9.2%
2022	523	+5.2%

The village core consists of a mix of two-storey nineteenth-century stone-built dwellings, single-storey cottages and bungalows. There are also new stone-built terraced dwellings within the village core.

A redeveloped thatched cottage and Oldtown Local Hall, a corrugated community hall, add to the identity of the village. The northern, western and southern approaches to the village are characterised mainly by low-density 'one-off' dormers and bungalows with the exception of Shamrock Park, a small council housing development to the south of the village.

== Facilities ==
Our Lady Queen of Peace, the local Catholic church, and presbytery are located south of the village core.

Commercial facilities in the village include a public house – The Oldtown House – and a veterinary surgery. Community facilities include the local primary school, the Catholic Church, the Oldtown Local Hall and a horse riding stable. The County Council's mobile library service visits the village on a weekly basis. The Oldtown Health and Care Centre is a Health Service Executive facility located to the south of the village which provides full-time care for disabled people and a community Health Centre where a variety of health and related services are provided.

Oldtown has a large playing field, close to the centre of the village, which is home to the Wild Geese GAA club. First founded in 1888, it is said to be one of the oldest Gaelic Athletic Association clubs in Dublin. The club won the Junior 'E' Dublin football championship in 2009, beating St. Brendans in the final. The club have underage teams, two adult men's teams and a camogie team. The field is also the location of an indoor handball alley. A number of former handball world champions are from the village. The alley is also used for racquetball.

== See also ==
- List of towns and villages in the Republic of Ireland
