= Glebe terrier =

"Glebe terrier" is a term specific to the Church of England. It is a document, usually a written survey or inventory, which gives details of glebe, lands and property in the parish owned by the Church of England and held by a clergyman as part of the endowment of his benefice, and which provided the means by which the incumbent (rector, vicar or perpetual curate) could support himself and his church.

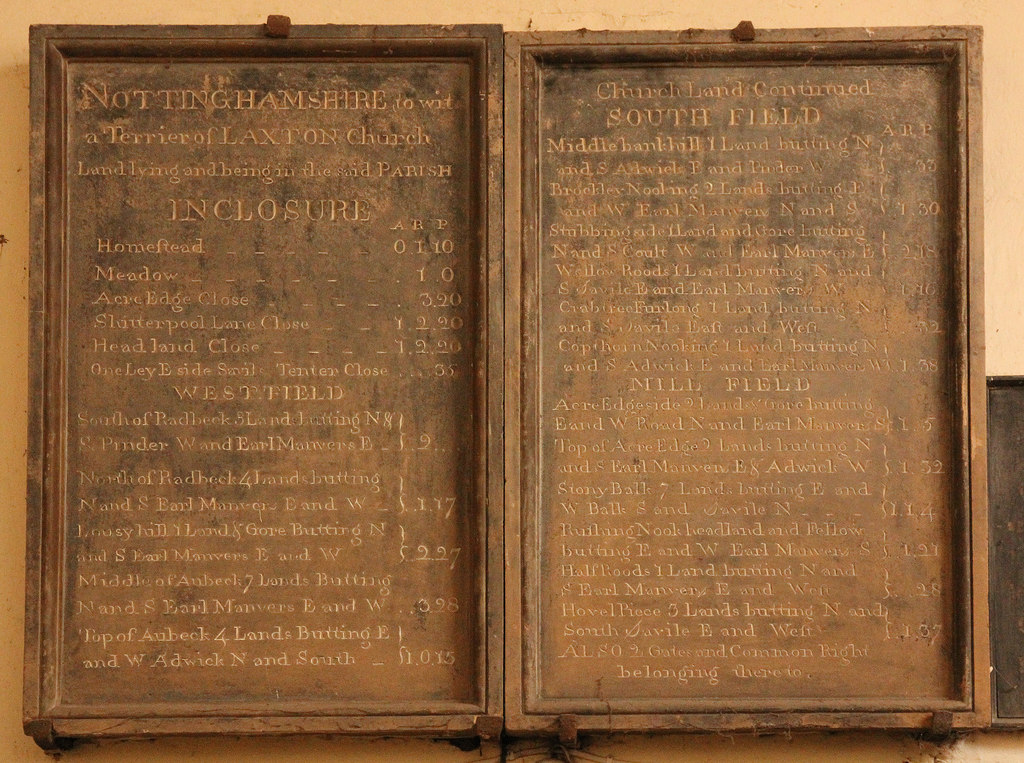
The glebe terrier of Laxton

== Overview ==
Typically, glebe would comprise the vicarage or rectory, fields and the church building itself, its contents and its graveyard. If there was an absentee rector the glebe would usually be divided into rectorial glebe and the rest. "Terrier" is derived from the Latin terra, "earth".

The glebe terrier would be drawn up at the time of each visitation, an official visit usually by the archdeacon. The archdeacon would visit each parish annually, and the bishop visited outlying parts of his diocese every few years to maintain ecclesiastical authority and conduct confirmations.

Each church was entitled to a house and glebe. The glebe lands were either cultivated by the clergyman himself, or by tenants to whom he leased the land. In those cases where the parsonage was not well-endowed with glebe, the clergyman's main source of income would come from the tithes.

Glebe terriers are useful historical documents as they may contain the names of tenants and the holders of adjoining lands. As the open field system comprised many narrow strips, often isolated from each other, within the larger fields, the terrier can provide useful information on the strips and furlongs in the parish. They may also contain information on how income from tithes was calculated and collected. The glebe terrier of Tintagel, Cornwall, compiled in 1679 is extant; in this parish the rectorial glebe was known as Trebissons and was owned by the Dean and Canons of St George's, Windsor.

Full lists of the holdings of each parish were first required in 1571. They vary greatly as the compilation of the survey was undertaken by and at the discretion of each individual clergyman. The surveys were then collected together in the Church of England Registries, but a copy was often kept in the parish. Many of the surveys are now kept in county record offices.

The churchwardens of every parish are now required to maintain a terrier of all church property in the parish, together with an inventory and log-book.

== Components ==
An ideal glebe terrier would comprise:

- The church and churchyard
  - a list of everything in the church itself, including its fabric, furniture, plate, bells and books.
  - the churchyard with special notes about customary obligations to repair walls or fences.
- The parsonage
  - a detailed description of the parsonage with its curtilage, a statement of how much of it is brick, wattle and daub, thatch, tile, plaster etc.
- Other properties
  - A detailed description of other buildings in the parish owned by the Church of England, and of the rents charged
- Glebe land
  - the amount of glebe which belonged to the benefice, often in yardlands, ploughlands or oxgangs, with all the abuttals and boundaries named.
  - how much meadow accompanied the ploughland and the method by which this meadow was re-allotted, usually annually.
  - how many cow-, horse- or sheep-gates were attached to the benefice and exercisable upon the common.
- Tithe revenue
  - description of the tithe revenue of the benefice, with details of tithe-free land and the customary arrangements as to the collection of tithe, or the payments in lieu of tithe.
- Use of the parish
  - notes regarding the use of the parish during Easter offerings, and mortuaries, surplice fees and other customary payments.
- Income and fees
  - a list of fees which the parish clerk could charge for such things as burial, funeral sermon, breaking the ground, marriage and tolling the bell. These fees were used to maintain the clerk, and the church clock.

== See also ==
- Inventory of Church Property
