= Garristown =

Village in County Dublin, Ireland

Garristown Baile Gháire (Irish)
- Village
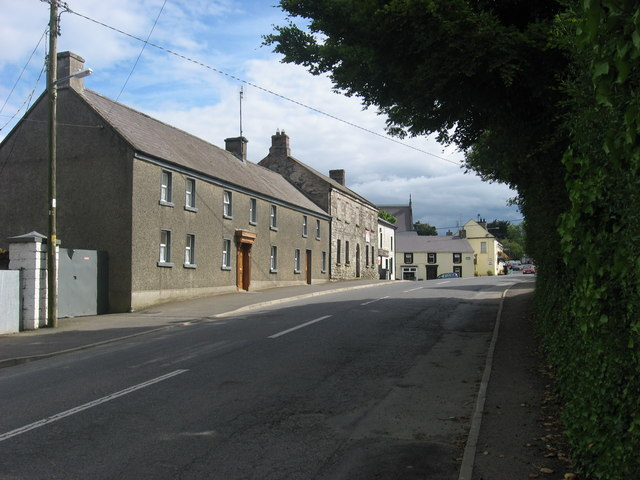
- Houses on Garristown's main street
- Interactive map of Garristown
- Coordinates: 53°34′0″N 6°23′00″W
- Country: Ireland
- Province: Leinster
- County: County Dublin
- Local government area: Fingal
- Elevation: 120 m (390 ft)

Population (2022)
  - Total: 619
- Time zone: UTC±0 (WET)
  - Summer (DST): UTC+1 (IST)
- Eircode routing key: A42
- Telephone area code: +353(0)1
- Irish Grid Reference: O071587

Garristown (Irish: Baile Gháire) is a village in County Dublin, Ireland. It is also a civil parish in the historic barony of Balrothery West. As of the 2022 census, the village had a population of 619.

Garristown
Year	Pop.	±%
1991	224	—
1996	228	+1.8%
2002	289	+26.8%
2006	257	−11.1%
2011	433	+68.5%
2016	509	+17.6%
2022	619	+21.6%

== Location ==
Garristown is 18 km north of Swords, and around 7 km northeast from Ashbourne, County Meath. It is also a short distance from Ballymadun. It is located in hilly country, sloping down from west to east, with views towards the hills around the Naul. The village centre is 120m above sea level.

== History ==
In the late 12th century, the area was associated with Richard Camerarius (chamberlain) who held "villa Ogari" and its church. Records from the late 12th and early 13th century indicate that John Comyn, Archbishop of Dublin, granted the church at Garristown to the priory of Lanthony. William de Bardelby, later a senior judge, was parish priest here in 1318. By 1607, features included a windmill at Holtrass hill and two other mills, with 326 acres (1.32 km^{2}) of land within the townland. The village was recorded in the Down Survey of 1654. The medieval church was later replaced by a Church of Ireland church.

Garristown's current street formation has not changed much since the Rocques map of County Dublin (c. 1746). In 1837, the village had a population of 741, and the surrounding civil parish 2,801. There was a police station, a dispensary, a windmill and churches of both the Church of Ireland (with a ruined residence constructed in 1791) and the Catholic Church (built in 1828), along with one national school for boys and two private schools. There were three fairs a year, and the area had natural resources in the form of stone and peat.

In the 1890s, there was a proposal to build a railway between Malahide railway station and Garristown. The line, which was proposed by the Malahide and Garristown Railway Company in 1894 and again in 1897, was not progressed.

The Church of Assumption, a Catholic church, was dedicated on 10 June 1906 on the site of the unbuilt railway station.

== Amenities ==
The main street of Garristown runs north to south, with a tree-lined mall on the western side, and the central area where Main Street meets the Naul Road. The police barracks in the centre of the village dates from the 19th century, and the Carnegie Library, still operational, from the early 20th century. The library was renovated in the 2000s.

Other amenities include a primary school (St. Mary's National School) and a community centre. The latter building was formerly used as a secondary school, Garristown VEC, which, after closure, was acquired by the community council and converted into a multi-purpose hall. The community centre is used by sub-groups of the community council, the local branch of the Irish Countrywomen's Association, a local scout group (76th Garristown) and the youth club. The base of the local windmill also survives.

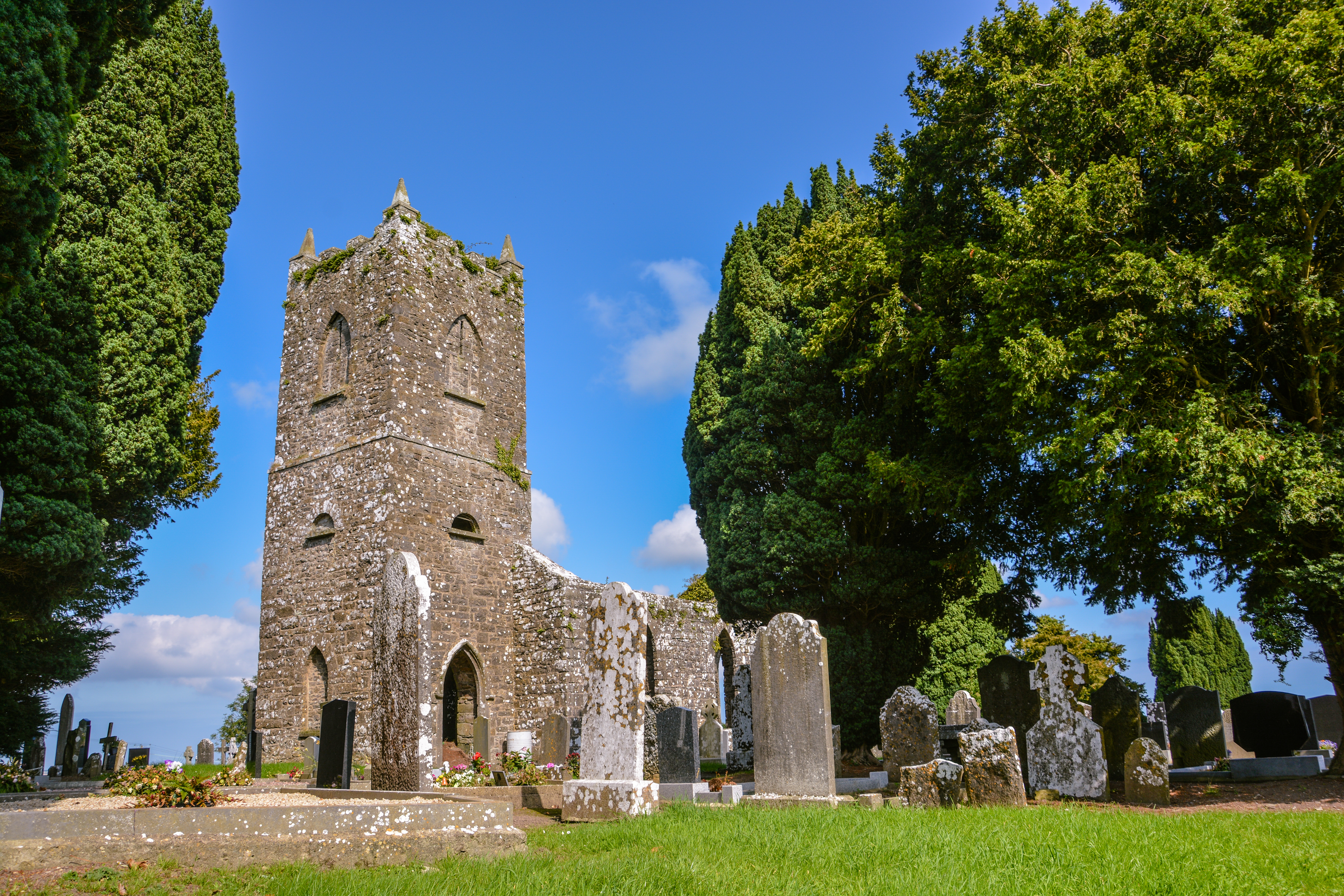
Former Church of Ireland (Anglican) church in Garristown

There is also a public house, butcher's shop, small supermarket, hairdressing salon and a service station. The village also has a Garda station.

The local Catholic church, the Church of the Assumption, is in Garristown parish in the Fingal North deanery. There is also a former Church of Ireland church and cemetery.

== Sport ==
The local GAA club, Garristown GFC, has its grounds to the east. It has 11 teams and a new clubhouse with a small gym. Other local groups include Garristown Gun Club and Garristown Historical Society and the Arena Airsoft Club.

Dublin Gaelic footballer Dean Rock is from the area.

== Administration ==
Garristown is in the local government area of Fingal and in the Dáil constituency of Dublin Fingal West. In 2005, Fingal County Council adopted an Urban Design Framework for an area immediately to the east of the village.

== See also ==
- List of towns and villages in Ireland
