= Guðmundur Pálmason =

Icelandic chess player (1928–2004)

Personal information
- Born: 11 June 1928
- Died: 11 March 2004 (aged 75)

Chess career
- Country: Iceland

Guðmundur Pálmason (11 June 1928 – 11 March 2004) was an Icelandic chess player and geologist. He is the author of Palmason Model.

== Biography ==
In 1949, Guðmundur Pálmason graduated from Menntaskólinn í Reykjavík. In 1955, he graduated as a physics engineer from the Royal Institute of Technology in Stockholm. Pálmason became its director in 1964 and held that position until the end of 1996. In parallel with his work, he served United Nations consultative work in the Philippines, Mali, El Salvador, Taiwan and North Korea. From 1973 to 1974, Guðmundur Pálmason was a visiting professor at Columbia University in New York.

=== Geological models ===
In 1971, he defended his doctoral dissertation at the University of Iceland about the construction of Iceland's crust based on wave refraction measurements. There Guðmundur Pálmason explained the first human outline in the construction of Iceland's crust. A few years later, he developed a computational Palmason Model that explained the main features of the geology of Iceland.

=== Awards ===
Guðmundur Pálmason received various awards for his work. He received the dr. phil. Ólafur Daníelsson and Sigurður Guðmundsson, the Ása Guðmundsdóttir Wright honorary award and the Icelandic Society of Engineers' badge of honor. He was elected a member of the Swedish Academy of Engineering Sciences and an honorary member of the Icelandic Geothermal Association.

=== Chess activities ===
From the mid-1950s to the end of the 1960s Guðmundur Pálmason was also one of the leading Icelandic chess players. In 1954, he participated in World Chess Championship Zonal Tournament in Mariánské Lázně. Guðmundur Pálmason regularly participated in Icelandic Chess Championships and Reykjavík International Chess tournaments (1964, 1966).

Guðmundur Pálmason played for Iceland in the Chess Olympiads:

- In 1954, at third board in the 11th Chess Olympiad in Amsterdam (+2, =4, -3),
- In 1958, at second board in the 13th Chess Olympiad in Munich (+3, =12, -1),
- In 1966, at third board in the 17th Chess Olympiad in Havana (+4, =5, -7).

Guðmundur Pálmason played for Iceland in the World Student Team Chess Championships:

- In 1954, at first board in the 1st World Student Team Chess Championship in Oslo (+4, =2, -3),
- In 1955, at first board in the 2nd World Student Team Chess Championship in Lyon (+4, =7, -1),
- In 1956, at second board in the 3rd World Student Team Chess Championship in Uppsala (+6, =2, -1) and won individual gold medal,
- In 1957, at second board in the 4th World Student Team Chess Championship in Reykjavík (+2, =10, -1).
