= Palmerstown, Fingal =

Civil parish in Fingal (and the traditional County Dublin), Ireland

Palmerstown (Irish: Baile Phámar) is a civil parish in the barony of Balrothery West in the modern county of Fingal, Ireland. It comprises six townlands: Cottrelstown, Folly, Jordanstown, Palmerstown, Whitestown, and Wolganstown. It is surrounded by the parishes of Clonmethan to the east, Grallagh to the north, Ballymadun to the northeast, Donaghmore to the southeast, and Greenoge to the south; the last two being in County Meath. Samuel Lewis recorded in 1837, when the Church of Ireland was the established church and the civil parish was conterminous with the ecclesiastical parish:

Good building stone is found in the parish. It is a rectory and vicarage, in the diocese of Dublin; the rectory is appropriate to the vicars choral of the cathedral of Dublin, and the vicarage forms part of the union and corps of the prebend of Clonmethan: of the tithes, amounting to £135, two-thirds are payable to the vicars choral, and the remainder to the vicar.

== See also ==
- Palmerstown, a southside suburb of Dublin
