= Naul Hills =

Hills in County Dublin, Ireland

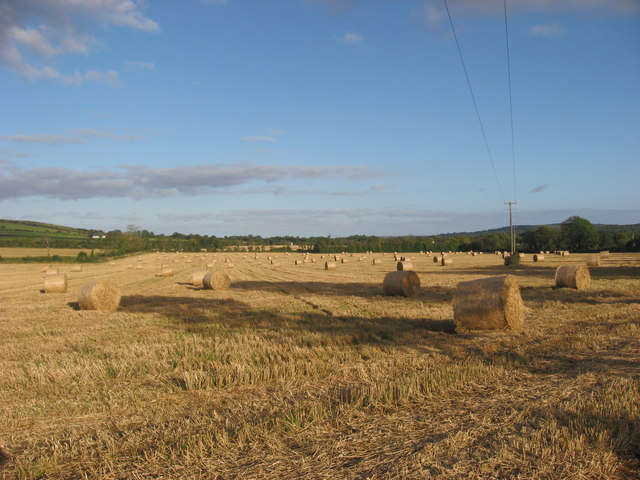
- View from Flemingtown, County Meath, towards the Naul Hills, with Knockbrack to the right

Highest point
- Elevation: 176 m (577 ft)
- Coordinates: 53.571871°N 6.258884°W

Naming
- Language of name: English

Geography
- Location within Ireland
- Location: County Dublin, Ireland
- Parent range: Naul Hills
- OSI/OSNI grid: O133602
- Topo map: OSI Discovery 43

Climbing
- Easiest route: West from M1 on R122, then south on R108.

The Naul Hills, or Man-of-War Hills are low-lying hills in north County Dublin, Ireland, close to the village of Naul, formerly called The Naul, (Irish: An Aill, meaning 'the cliff'). They lie beside the County Meath border, 30 kilometres north of Dublin City (17 km north of the airport), 16 km north-northwest of Swords, and 8 km southwest of Balbriggan.

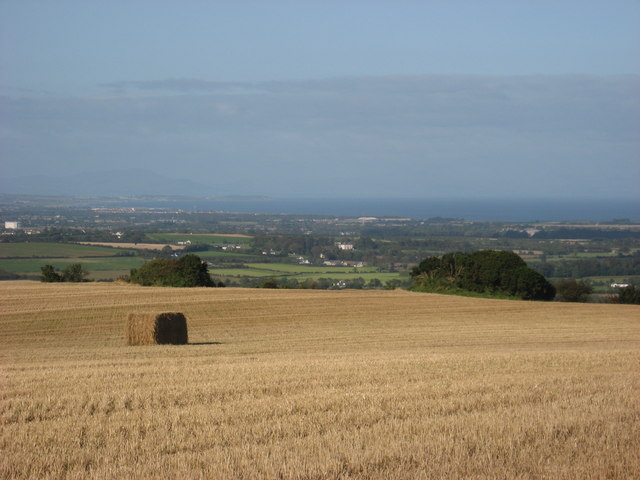
Mounds near Knockbrack hill

Typical hill elevations run between 140 and 150 metres, with the highest point in the area being the 176m Knockbrack (Irish: An Cnoc Breac, meaning 'the speckled hill'). Limestone quarrying has been carried out in the hills, and the London Encyclopaedia (1829) remarked, "there are coals at Naul...but the coal vein is not worked."

As a result of the COVID-19 pandemic, the temporary reduction in emissions as well as a period of sustained fine weather meant that Knockbrack was visible across the Irish Sea from Anglezarke, Lancashire for a period in May 2020.

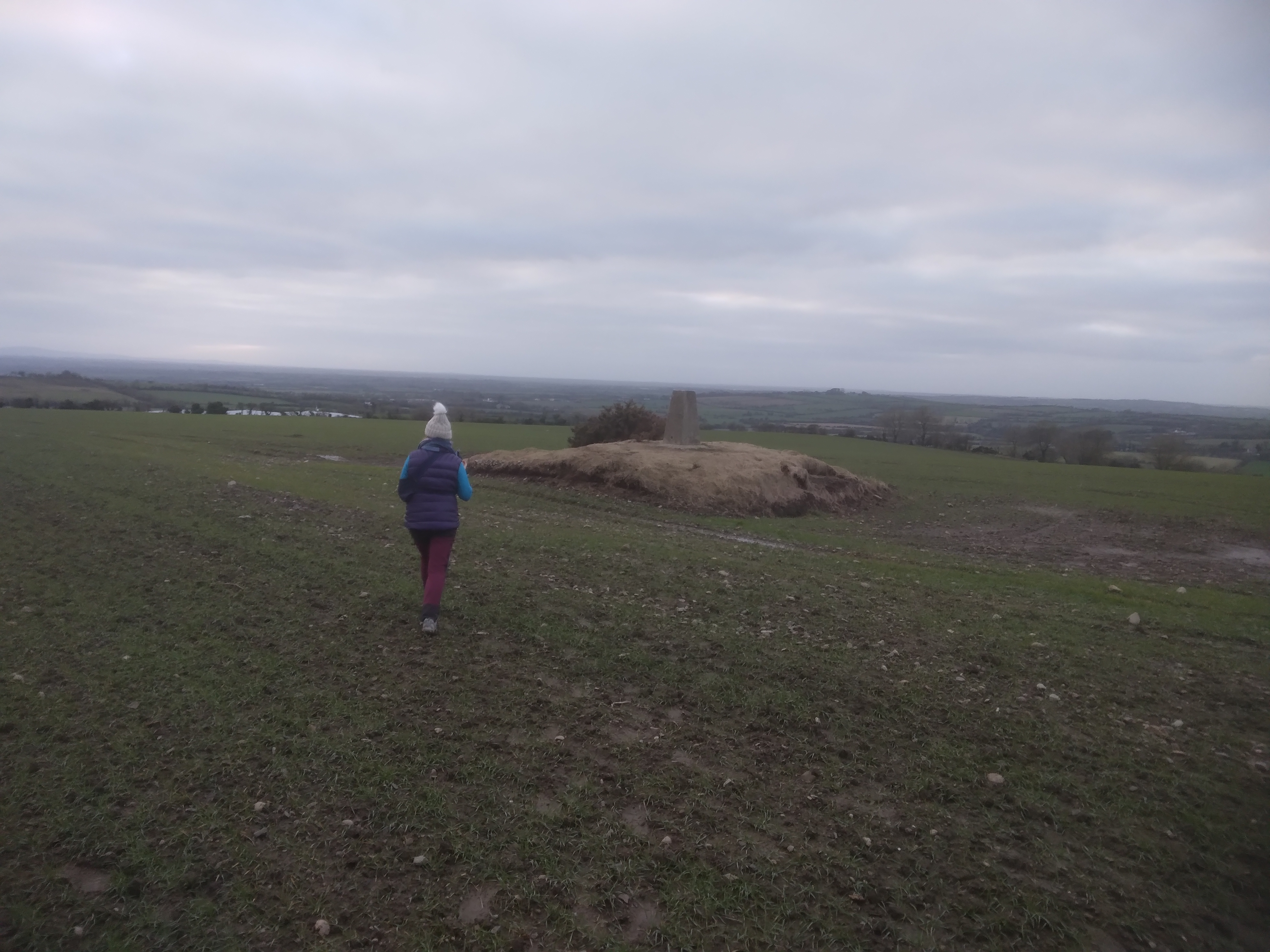
Summit of Knockbrack (An Cnoc Breac) in Jan 2022

== See also ==
- List of mountains in Ireland
