= Altarage =

Payment to priest for mass

Altarage is a term once commonly used in an ecclesiastical context to signify the revenue reserved for the chaplain (altarist or altar-thane) in contradistinction to the income of the parish priest — it came to indicate the funds received by a priest from the laity when discharging a particular function for them, e.g., marriages, baptisms, and funerals. The term is largely obsolete, having been replaced by the more specific honorarium, stipend, or stole-fee.

== History ==
"The word 'alterage' can be given no very hard and fast meaning, although possibly local usages were quite fixed." In 1371, testimony was taken indicating that at Sudbury, the chaplain who served the chapel at Salcote was maintained by the rector out of the alterage. The rectors generally took the profits from the glebe and a tithe of corn and hay, leaving the small tithes to the officiating priest. Small tithes were often paid in beans or hops. As the alterage was intended for the support of the priest conducting the service, often instead of or on behalf of a rector or prebendary, it sometimes became the practice to assign to the officiating priest a portion of land and the profits derived therefrom.

The lack of clarity in failing to distinguish between "alterage", "small tithes", and "altar dues" and which rightfully belonged to the vicar and which to the rector and for what use caused a number of legal cases to be brought before the Exchequer in the reign of Elizabeth I. The courts came to rely on documents which defined the respective rights of the parties.

Around 1517, Cardinal Otho found members of the clergy abusing the custom to the extent of requiring a donation before they would take a confession. He issued a decree that any priest found guilty of such conduct should be removed from and deprived of all benefices, be barred from any further appointments and have their priestly faculties forever suspended.

In his 1537 Smalcald Articles,Martin Luther noted that "innumerable and unspeakable abuses have arisen in the whole world from the buying and selling of masses". On another occasion, he was recorded as once saying, "The mass has devoured infinite sums of money".

The Italian priest Pino Puglisi refused money from Mafia members when offered it for the traditional feast day celebrations and also resisted the Mafia in other ways for which he was martyred in 1993.

== Present day ==
In 2014, Pope Francis criticized a tendency on the part of priests and laity to become overly business-oriented by charging a fee for the use of a church for weddings, and posting a price list for baptisms, blessings and Mass intentions. He reminded all pastors that "redemption is free; it is God’s free gift".

He reiterated this during a general audience in March 2018. When speaking of the Eucharistic Prayer, he said "the Mass is not paid for, redemption is free, if I want to make an offering, well and good, but Mass is free." In response to inquiries, the bishops of Peninsular Malaysia issued a statement clarifying that "The practice of Mass offerings, which is an ancient one that dates back to the early Church, does not constitute “paying” for the Mass. It is not a “fee” for the Mass, which is always free." According to canon law, "any priest celebrating or concelebrating is permitted to receive an offering to apply the Mass for a specific intention."

Most churches in the Philippines charge a wedding fee with discounts for parishioners or weekday weddings. Air-conditioned churches charge extra to cover electricity and other operational costs. In 2019 a parish in the exclusive Forbes Park village in Manila withdrew a planned fee hike for weddings after widespread opposition on social media. The fee, about $6,000 per wedding, was being increased to $9,800.
