= Palmerstown =

Suburb of Dublin, Ireland

Palmerstown Baile Phámar (Irish)
- Suburb
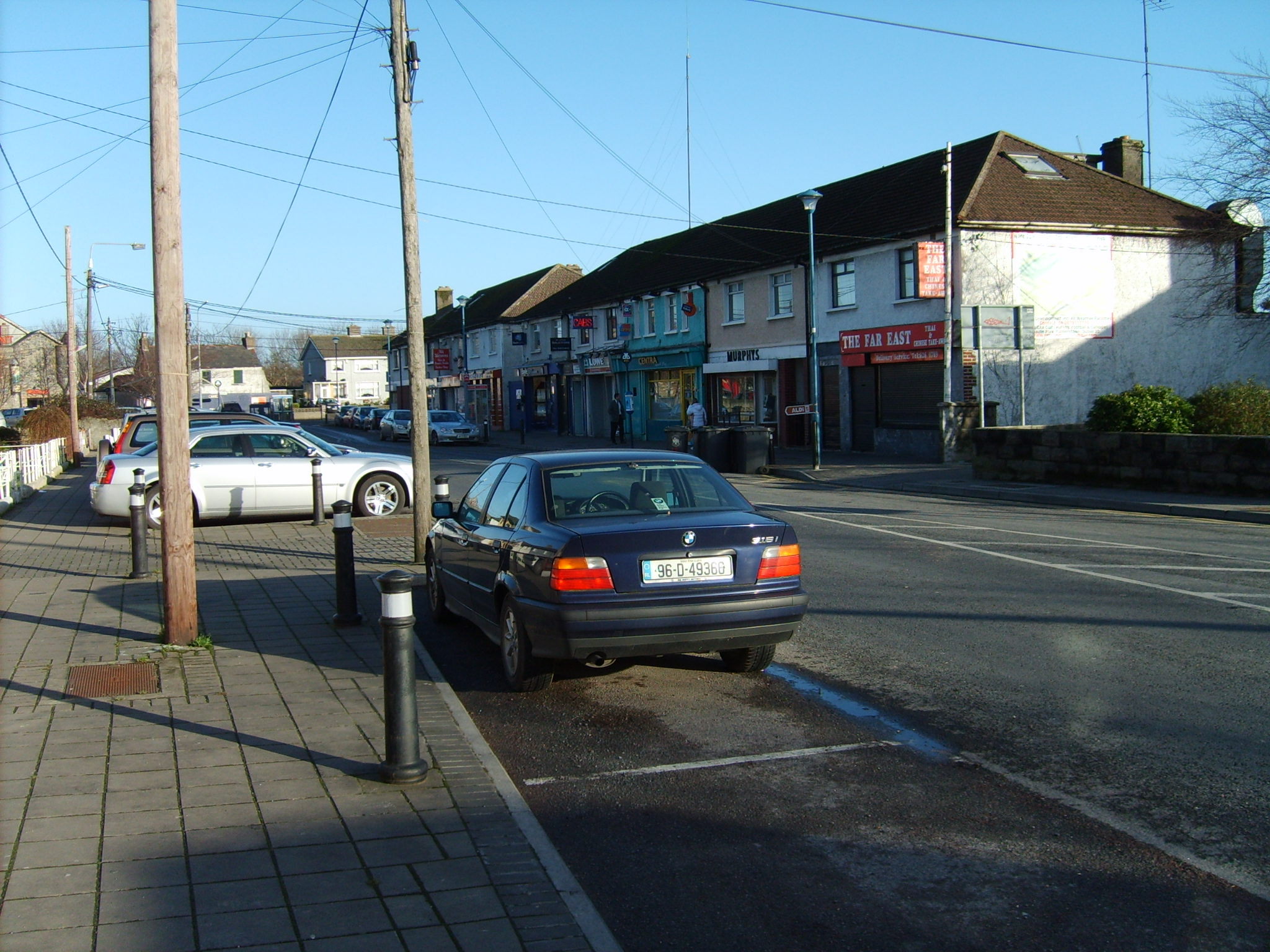
- Street and storefronts in Palmerstown in 2007

- Location in Dublin
- Coordinates: 53°21′00″N 6°22′44″W
- Country: Ireland
- Province: Leinster
- County: County Dublin
- Dáil Éireann: Dublin Mid-West
- European Parliament: Dublin
- Elevation: 17 m (56 ft)

Population (2016)
  - Urban: 11,130
- Time zone: UTC+0 (WET)
  - Summer (DST): UTC-1 (IST (WEST))
- Eircode routing key: D20, D22
- Irish Grid Reference: O082345

Palmerstown (Irish: Baile Phámar; officially Palmerston, see spelling) is a civil parish and suburb in western Dublin, Ireland on the banks of the River Liffey. It lies within the Dublin Mid-West parliamentary constituency and forms part of the South Dublin local authority area. The area is bordered to the north by the River Liffey and the Strawberry Beds, to the west by Lucan, to the south-west by Clondalkin, to the south by Ballyfermot and to the east by Chapelizod. Palmerstown village is situated near the Liffey Valley Shopping Centre. The area is near the junction of the M50 motorway and the N4 road. It lies approximately 7 km west of Dublin city centre. The Old Lucan Road, once the main western route out of the city, passes through the centre of Palmerstown village.

== Name origin and spelling ==
A "palmer" in medieval times was a pilgrim who returned from the Holy Land with a palm branch or leaf. Between 1185 and 1188 Ailred the Palmer and his wife took religious vows and founded a priory and monastic hospital of Crutched Friars outside the West Gate of Dublin, on the road to Kilmainham, which they endowed with all their property. In 1188 Pope Clement III confirmed the priory's grants, including both the parish of Palmerstown west of Kilmainham and the other parish of Palmerstown northwards in Fingal. Gerard Lee notes an association of palmers with leper hospitals, of which there was one dedicated to Saint Laurence in the townland of the Saint Laurence in Palmerstown.

The spelling "Palmerston" rather than "Palmerstown" was fixed by the Ordnance Survey of Ireland in the 1830s; this remains the legal spelling and is officially recognised by South Dublin County Council. Locals generally use "Palmerstown", and road signs have used both. A plebiscite of residents is required for a legal name change. (Note: Technically, the plebiscite is of ratepayers, both business and domestic, as required by the Local Government Act 1946 and detailed in a 1956 statutory instrument. Domestic rates have not been levied since 1978 but residents are still legally classed as ratepayers. The relevant provisions of the 1946 act are replaced by Part 18 of the Local Government Act 2001, itself amended in 2011. However, the 1956 provisions were used for the Palmerstown plebiscites held in 2009 and 2014, because Part 18 had not commenced.) In 2009, a plebiscite to change to "Palmerstown" received a majority of votes cast but not of eligible voters. The area concerned was the townlands of Palmerston Upper and Palmerston Lower with an estimated electorate of 8,000. Supporters of the change argued that the wording of the ballot confused some voters who wanted "Palmerstown" but voted No. They also argue the spelling without W creates confusion with Palmerston Park further east in Rathmines. Opponents argue the cost of changing road signs is prohibitive. Others argue that the name "Palmerston" legally applies only to the civil parish and townland, and that the locality known as "Palmerstown" has a separate identity. In 2014, another plebiscite was held, restricted to the electoral division (ED) of Palmerston Village (bounded by the Liffey, M50, and N4) and excluding the adjoining ED of Palmerston West. The electorate was 641, of whom 425 voted in favour and 17 against; the change to "Palmerstown Village" was formally approved at the county council meeting in January 2015.

The title Viscount Palmerston created in 1722 in the Peerage of Ireland derives from the place; its spelling also varied, but the form "Lord Palmerston" is now usual for the Victorian prime minister.

== Townlands ==
The civil parish of Palmerstown is the most northerly parish in the former Barony of Uppercross. Much of Palmerstown has been developed for residential, transportation and commercial purposes over the last half century. Townlands include:

- Palmerston Lower
- Palmerston Upper
- Irishtown
- Saint Laurence
- Johnstown
- Palmerstown Manor
- Yellow Walls
- Fonthill
- Redcowfarm
- Woodfarm
- Quarryvale
- Brooklawn
- Liffey Valley

=== Palmerstown village ===
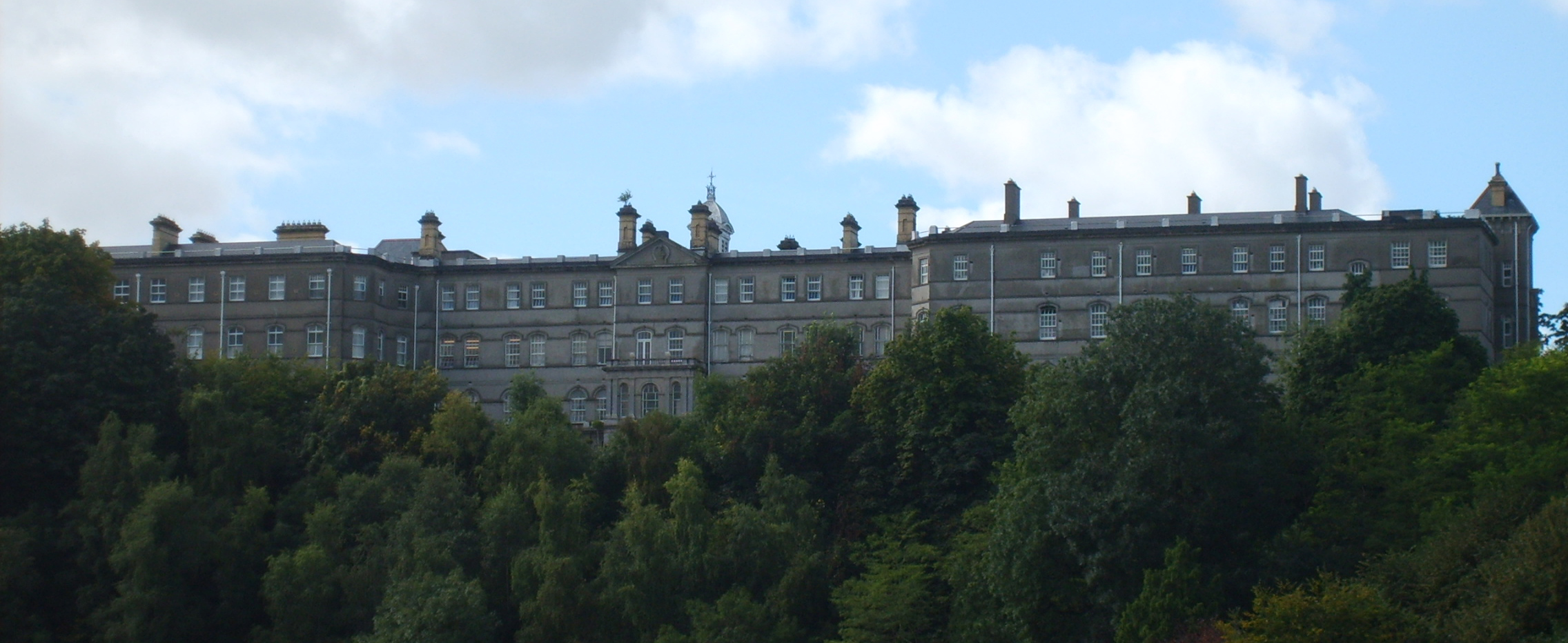
The main building of Stewarts Care and HSE from Mill Lane

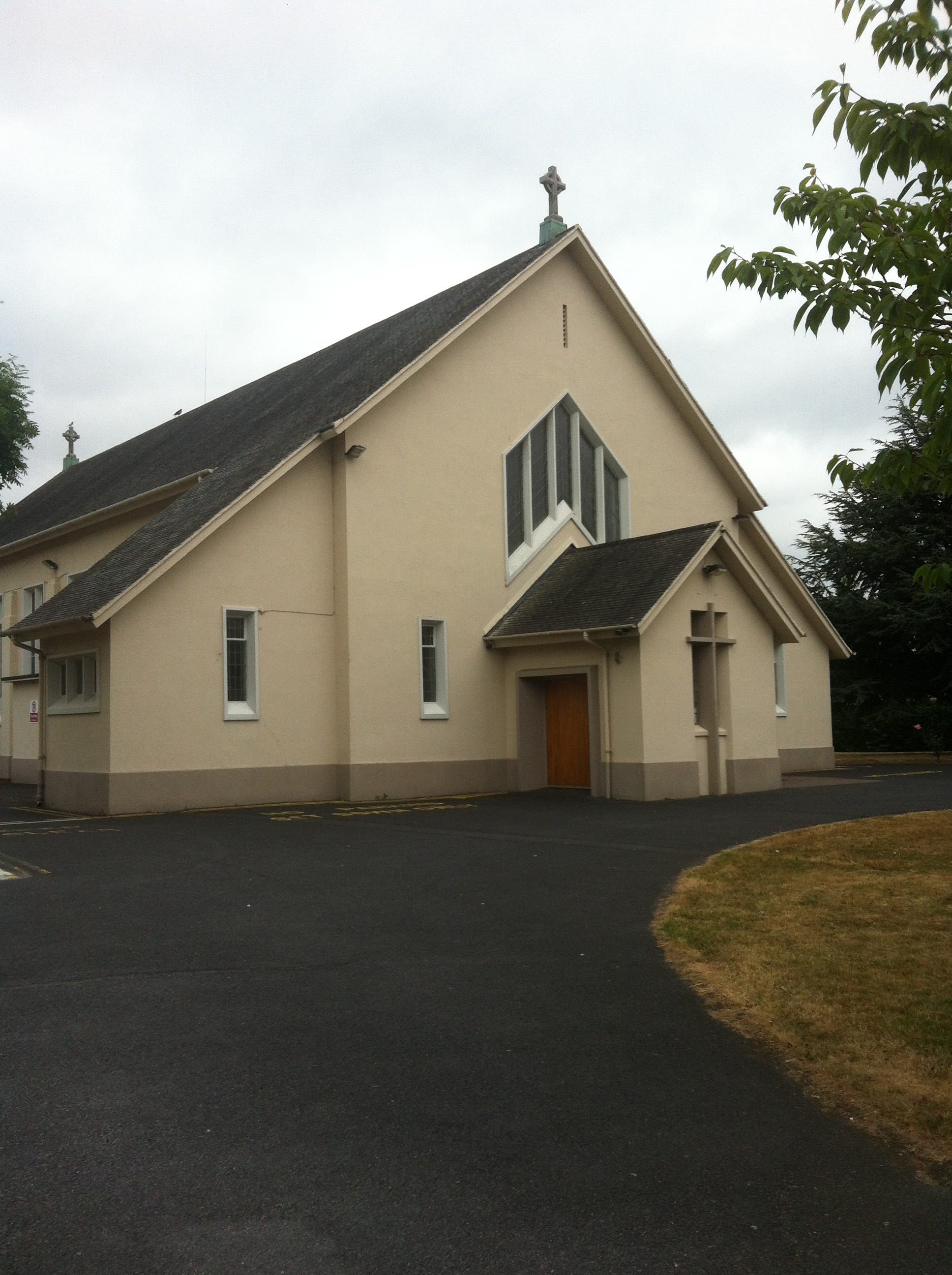
St. Philomenas Roman Catholic Church in Palmerstown Village

The townlands of Palmerstown Upper and Palmerstown Lower straddle the old Lucan Road, which was the ancient western highway. Many of Palmerstown's local amenities are located in a cluster along the road. Robin Villas and Hollyville were labourers' cottages built at the beginning of the last century. The old national school is now a community centre. Stewarts Hospital, (formerly the residence of the Hely-Hutchinson family, the Roman Catholic Church of St. Philomena, the National School and a variety of general enterprises, including a bank and convenience stores, are located here. Stewartscare is a health care facility at the Stewarts buildings and grounds, which overlook the meandering Liffey valley. The Stewarts complex houses the administration of the Irish Health Service Executive. Stewarts Sports and Leisure centre is open to the general public. It also hosts an annual summer camp.

=== Redcow Farm and Glenaulin Park ===
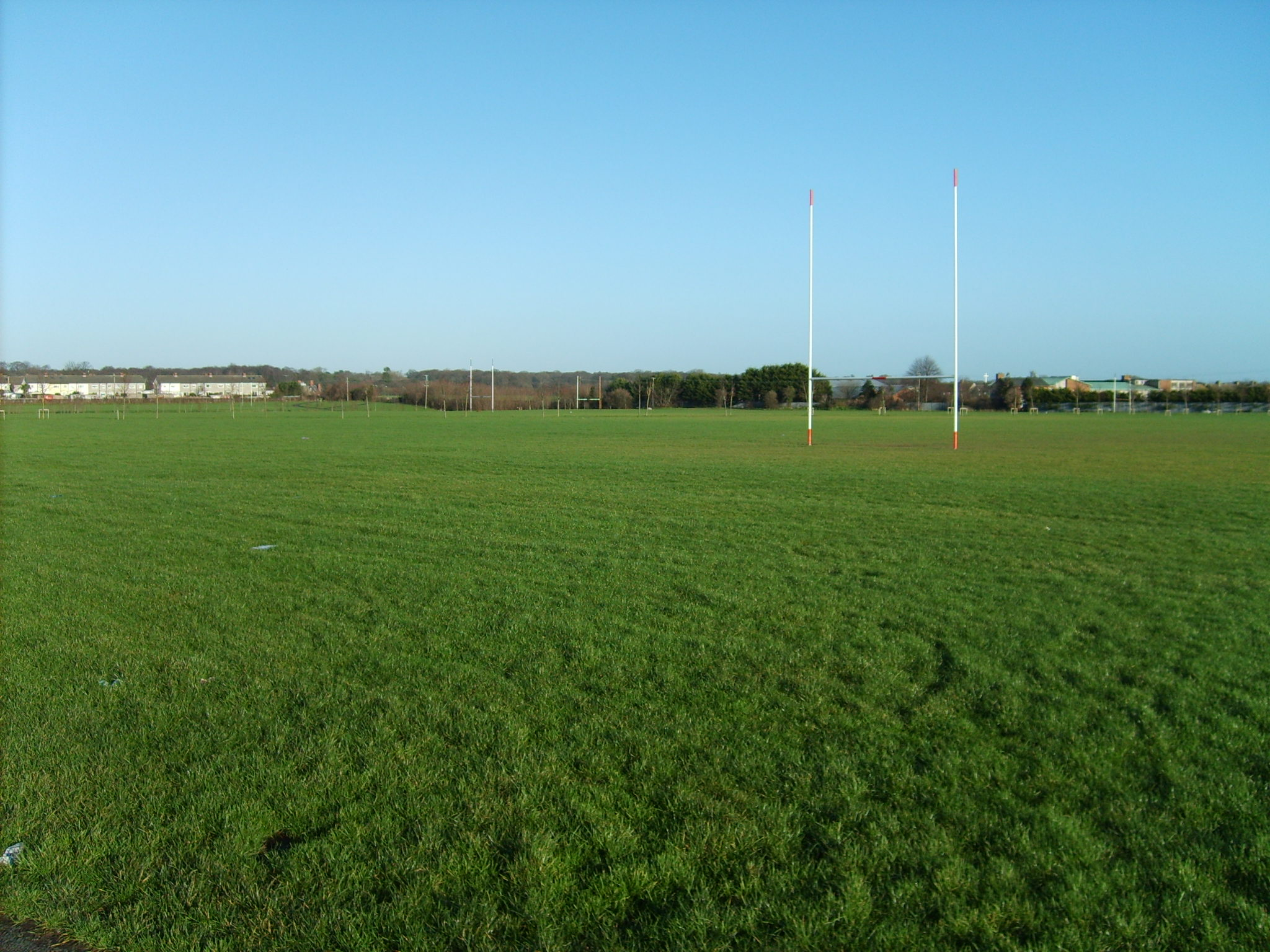
Glenaulin Park, adjacent to St. Patrick's GAA Club and home to many local sports fixtures

This area was the location of the first modern housing development in Palmerstown, constructed between 1955 and 1965. Centred on Manor road, this area contains several shops, the local credit union and a doctor's surgery. To the east of Redcow Farm, adjacent to the "California Hills" Park, is Glenaulin Park, a public park also home to St. Patricks GAA club. The park contains a short stretch of a local stream, the Glenaulin Stream, a Liffey tributary most of which runs in culvert.

The name 'California Hills' was given by the children of the area to a small wasteland in Ballyfermot to the northeast of Glenaulin Park, which had been a builders' dump during the construction of the main Palmerstown Estate in the mid to late 1960s. The wasteland had a series of small hills, which were in fact mounds of rubble which had been buried under clay and eventually over grown with wild grass. The children of the area sometimes shortened the name to 'The Caliers' and this name is also still in use today. The hills or mounds were flattened some years ago, and the area was landscaped for communal/public use.

=== Palmerstown Lower ===
Mill Lane leads to the original Palmerstown settlement and the centre of industry, which once employed over 600 millhands, craftsmen, and labourers. This seventeenth-century low-lying waterside industrial village was complete with flax, seed, oil, flour and cloth mills. The ruin of a pre-Norman church and the remains of the once prosperous thriving community are situated near the river. A small ferry crossed the Liffey here, to where the Wren's Nest pub was situated on the North side. A football ground opposite the river Liffey is home to Palmerstown F.C. Muhammad Ali visited Stewarts Hospital on 15 July 1972 when the hospital was hosting its annual sporting fete.

=== Palmerstown Manor ===
Palmerstown's largest housing estate was built in the early 1990s in the south east of the area. Adjacent to the Coldcut and Kennelsfort roads and the M50 motorway, the estate marks the 'border' between Palmerstown with Ballyfermot and Clondalkin.

=== Woodfarm Acres ===
The townland of Woodfarm Acres was mostly farmland, with a few council cottages that previously existed on the site. This housing development was built during the 1970s. The estate is bounded by the M50 motorway and N4. Adjacent to Woodfarm Acres is another shopping centre containing a grocery store, a gym, the youth centre, and other amenities. Access to the local cemetery is adjacent to this centre. Also located nearby is Pobalscoil Isolde, a secondary-level community school which opened in the 1980s.

=== Oakcourt ===
The Oakcourt housing estate lies in the western part of the 59-acre Johnstown townland, behind Pobalscoil Iosolde. It was originally developed in the 1970s, and expanded in the mid-1990s. The Johnstown townland extends due west from the Georgian Johnstown House (now St. John's College) on Le Fanu Rd. It runs west to Kennelsfort Road and lies between St. Laurence townland (the St. Laurence House is now the West County Hotel) from the River Liffey and Chapelizod in the north, to Ballyfermot Upper/Blackditch in the south.

== Transport ==
=== Bus ===
Dublin Bus provides services east to Dublin city and west to Lucan, Celbridge, Leixlip, and Maynooth.

Route 80 operates from Liffey Valley to Palmerston Park in Rathmines via Kennelsfort Road Upper and Chapelizod.

Route L55, a local route, runs from the Old Lucan Road to Chapelizod via Ballyfermot.

Route G2 operates via the Coldcut road to Spencer Dock via Dublin city.

Routes C1, C2, C3 and C4 operate via the Chapelizod Bypass to Ringsend or Sandymount via Dublin City.

=== Former rail station ===
Palmerstown railway station on the Dublin and Lucan tramway, later part of the Dublin United Transport Company tram system, opened in November 1881 and closed on 13 April 1940.

== Waterstown Park ==
Waterstown Park is a public park on the right bank of the River Liffey (53.36°N 6.37°W). It was a farm until the 1980s.

The park consists of woodland, wet grassland, and mature hedgerows, and it contains 300 species of plants, animals, birds, and insects. Bird species include blackbirds, blackcaps, bullfinches, buzzards, chiffchaffs, dunnocks, jays, kingfishers, long-tailed tits, ravens, robins, siskins, sparrowhawks, and willow warblers.

There is a 5 km track for walking, jogging, and cycling; a dog park; exercise equipment; a picnic area; and a children's playground was added in September 2019.

== Palmerstown Cemetery ==
Palmerstown Cemetery on Kennelsfort Road opened in 1978. It is managed as part of the Dublin Cemeteries Trust.

== See also ==
- List of towns and villages in the Republic of Ireland
