= Naul, County Dublin =

Village in County Dublin, Ireland

Naul An Aill (Irish)
- Village and district
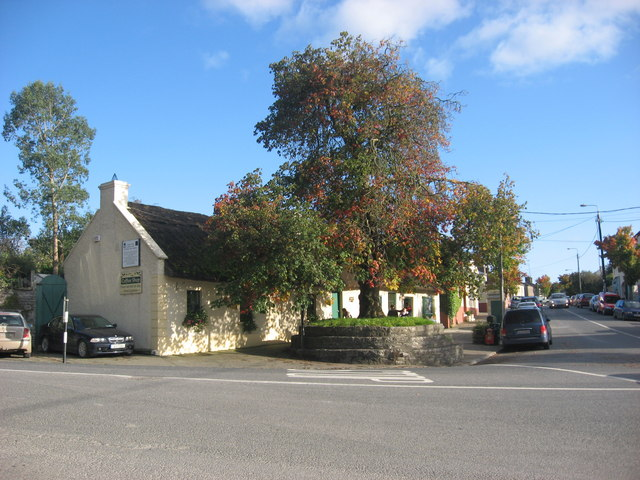
- Séamus Ennis Arts Centre, Naul

- Location in Ireland
- Coordinates: 53.586°N 6.290°W
- Country: Ireland
- Province: Leinster
- County: County Dublin
- Local government area: Fingal
- Elevation: 75 m (246 ft)

Population (2022)
  - Urban: 684
- Irish Grid Reference: O130609

Naul (Irish: An Aill, meaning 'The Cliff', also known as "The Naul"), is a village, townland, and civil parish at the northern edge of the traditional County Dublin (in the modern county of Fingal) in Ireland. The Delvin River to the north of the village marks the county boundary with County Meath. Naul civil parish is in the historic barony of Balrothery West.

== Location and geography ==
The village sits on the crossroad of the R122 and R108 regional roads, the latter being the traditional route between Dublin and the port of Drogheda, while the R122 travels from Finglas in the south to Balbriggan.

The River Delvin passes through Naul at the north, through a deep valley known as 'The Roche' which is hemmed in by steep banks and rocky cliffs which rise to 20 metres at one point. In the valley, there is a natural waterfall known as 'Waterfall of The Roches'. Further downstream, the river has been dammed, forming an artificial pond and cascade with a small private hydroelectric plant.

Naul village and the surrounding townlands, which comprise the area of Naul, sit on the Northern border of County Dublin and Fingal. However, the area locally known as Naul also extends north of the county border into county Meath. The area of north county Dublin comprises 2,627 acres and includes 15 townlands: Naul (An Aill), Hazardstown (Baile an Hasardaigh), Reynoldstown (Baile Raghnaill), Coolfores (An Chúil Fhuar), Doolagh (Dúlach), Fortyacres (Daichead Acra), Winnings (Uininn), Hynestown (Baile Héin), Cabin Hill (Cnoc an Chábáin), Flacketstown (Baile Fhlaicéid), Lecklinstown (Baile Leithghlinne) and Westown (An Baile Thiar).

== Name ==
The name is anglicised from the Irish An Aill meaning "The Cliff" as there is a substantial cliff on either side of the River Delvin just outside the village.

The village is still widely known as The Naul as a throwback to the original Irish name, although this is not recognised officially.

== History ==
The area is thought to have been occupied since the Stone Age – archaeological finds include numerous prehistoric earthworks, and the nearby megalithic passage tomb and chambered cairns at Fourknocks, around 2.5 km north into Meath from the village, discovered in 1949 on the lands of Thomas Connell. Four prehistoric tumuli, or mounds, were discovered. They contain a chamber wider than the one at Newgrange, and within the passage are strange stone engravings, indicating that the chambers were built about 4,000 years ago.

=== Black Castle ===
Less than a hundred metres north of the graveyard, now completely shrouded under the tight grip of ancient ivy, stands the ruins of the Black Castle. Once described as "one of the most picturesque ruins of its kind in Ireland".

The Black Castle, also known as Castle of the Roches, Cruise's Castle or Naul Castle is "boldly situated on a rocky precipice on the brow of a chain of hills, commanding a fine view of the vale of Roches, above which it towers at a height of upwards of 150 feet". The Black Castle sentinels the Dublin side of the valley, as did the White Castle over the Delvin River, on the opposing Meath bank of the valley, both owing their names due to the hue of the stone they were built from.

The castle is supposed to have been a strong castle, built by the Norman De Geneville family towards the close of the 12th century. It was protected on its north and east sides by a sheer cliff and on the west by mighty walls, with a spacious bawn to shelter its cattle herd. Around the year 1200, the castle passed, through marriage, to Stephen De Crues of the Cruise family, who were amongst the first Norman settlers in Ireland. His descendant, Sir John Cruys or Cruise (died 1407), was a distinguished soldier and diplomat. Naul was one of his many estates, which also included Mount Merrion, Booterstown and Donnybrook.

In a deed of John, Lord of Ireland from 1200, the church of Stephen de Crues is mentioned, which is thought to have replaced the ruins of an earlier Celtic shrine on the site of the present graveyard. The Catholic church was served by resident vicars for three hundred years, becoming a Protestant church during Elizabeth I's reign. It was recorded as ruinous by 1630, and mass was said on alternate Sundays in either the Black or White castles. The ruins were later replaced with a Protestant church in 1818 which used to stand in the graveyard until it became redundant and was demolished in 1949.

In the year 1641 Christopher Cruise is recorded as owning "one old castle with an old hall covered in straw, one orchard, one garden plot, ten tenements and the walls of ye parish church" as his inheritance. However, dusk was swiftly closing in on the Cruise family of Naul. When they participated in the rebellion of 1641, they were dispossessed of their castle and lands. Cromwell attacked and destroyed the castle in 1649 'when 40 of its defenders were put to the sword – a lone female escaping'. This marked the end of the Cruise family and their lordship of Naul.

Later Oliver Plunkett is reputed to have been a frequent visitor to the Black Castle and, according to legend, is supposed to have been captured here for preaching during penal times. Plunkett was the last religious martyr to be hung, drawn and quartered in England. His head is now on display in St. Peters's church in Drogheda.

During his visit to Ireland in 2013 to promote the premiere of Oblivion, American actor Tom Cruise was told his ancestors were Cruises of Naul, which was uncovered by a genealogical project commissioned as part of The Gathering by Tourism Ireland.

In 1966, a large portion of the castle containing the southern spiral stairwell collapsed; it is now half the size it was then. Large parts of the north and east walls remain, however, ivy compromises the 800-year-old ruins.

=== White Castle ===
North-West of the Black Castle, on the opposing bank across the Delvin river in County Meath, the White Castle once stood. The White Castle or Snowtown Castle is believed to have been built in the 13th century by the Caddell Family who were granted land along the Meath border of Naul from their relative Hugh De Lacey.'Snowtown Castle' is shown on Roque's 1760 map of the area.

When visiting Naul on 10 August 1781, Austin Cooper wrote; "... On the Hill over the Glen, is an oblong Castle in ruins with gable ends. On the Meath side is a large square castle, with towers at each corner, whose diameter are equal to the spaces between them. It is very ruinous as well as some mural enclosures about it. By the boldness of the situation over the river, & remains of Gardens, Terraces and Walks &c., I imagine it to have once been a place of some Elegance & Note."

The Caddells were evicted by Oliver Cromwell's general, De Fyne, in 1649. The lands were later released to Arthur Mervyn, who built the three mills in Naul. The Pollard family later inherited the White Castle and surrounding land, and in 1787, the castle was demolished. A remaining portion of the east face of the castle was later incorporated into Naul Park House c. 1800 when the Ennis family acquired the lands. The gardens experienced a revival of their former grandeur and were award-winning gardens for a time. The Woods family later owned Naul Park house until the property was sold in 1961. Naul Park house and the final remains of the castle were flattened c. 1980. All that remains are some ground floor footings, some stone walls and overgrown shrubbery from the former gardens.

Legend has it that Nellie Netterville, on fleeing Cromwell's attack on the Black Castle, placed a curse on the White Castle as she was heading west for revenge on the White Castle, which was spared shelling. Subsequently, anyone who owned the Castle and grounds suffered bad fortune from there on. The site of the castle was left aside when the land was sold in recent years (Nulty, 2008). It now lies overgrown with briars.

Caddell's Folly a Georgian temple constructed by the Caddell family in the 1840s, still stands in moderate condition in lands nearby the old castle on the Meath side of the Delvin river.

== Arts ==
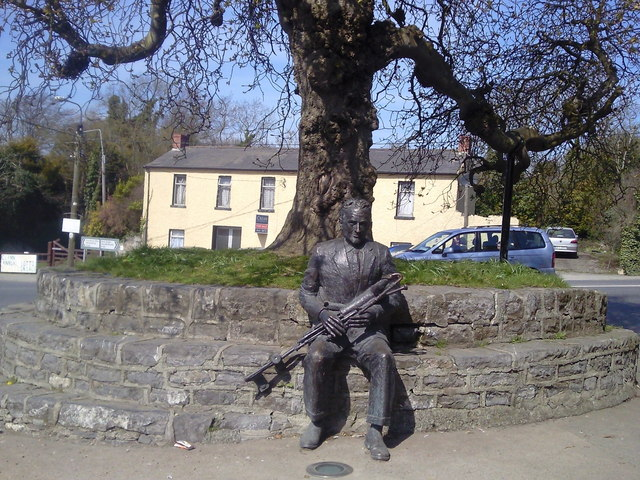
Seamus Ennis statue

The Séamus Ennis Arts Centre (SEAC), which was officially opened in October 2001, promotes and develops the traditional arts, and organises and hosts recitals, music sessions, workshops and classes. The idea for a cultural centre based on the achievements of Séamus Ennis had its origins in the Scoil Shéamuis Ennis, a festival held every October in the Naul area. This non-profit organisation was set up to commemorate the work and life of the musician, organise the running of events and classes and create training and employment opportunities for those involved in community development.

== Sport ==
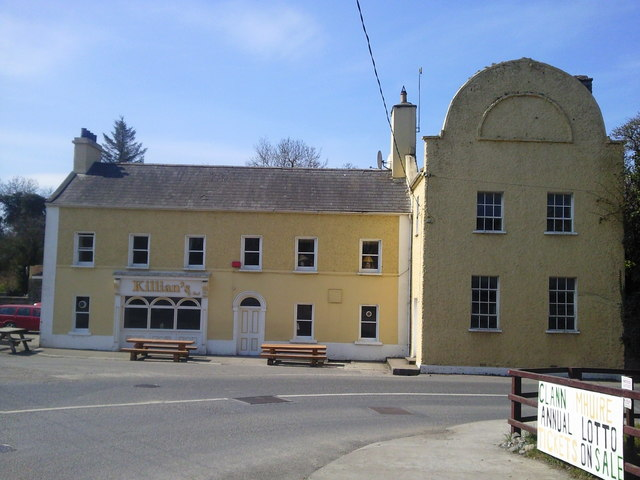
Killian's Bar in the village

Clann Mhuíre CLG is the local Gaelic Athletic Association club. It was founded in 1957 and currently fields football teams from Under-8 to Under-18. There is an adult male football team that plays in Division AFL4, and a ladies' football team.

== Religion ==
Naul is a parish in the Fingal North deanery of the Roman Catholic Archdiocese of Dublin. There is a Catholic church in the village, named for the Nativity of Our Lady. The church was erected in 1821, as inscribed on the diamond-shaped limestone plaque on its front façade.

Up until 1949, there was a Church of Ireland church building in Naul; it was demolished due to the decline of the religion in the area and the insufficient number of worshipers/attendees. The church used to stand on the west side of the graveyard and was accessed from a flight of steps off the laneway. The former church was built in 1818 during the reign of Elizabeth I, replacing an earlier ruinous Catholic church on the site. The earlier catholic church was recorded as being in good condition in 1615, however, it was ruinous in 1630. In 1537 Nicholas Bellew of Westown established a chapelry in Naul. The original Catholic Church on this site is believed to have been built by Stephen De Crues (Cruise), of the 'Black Castle' in Naul in AD1200 which is believed to have replaced an earlier Celtic church or shrine on the site.

== See also ==
- Naul Hills
- List of towns and villages in Ireland
