= Enfield railway station (Ireland) =

Railway station in Enfield, County Meath, Ireland

Enfield An Bóthar Buí
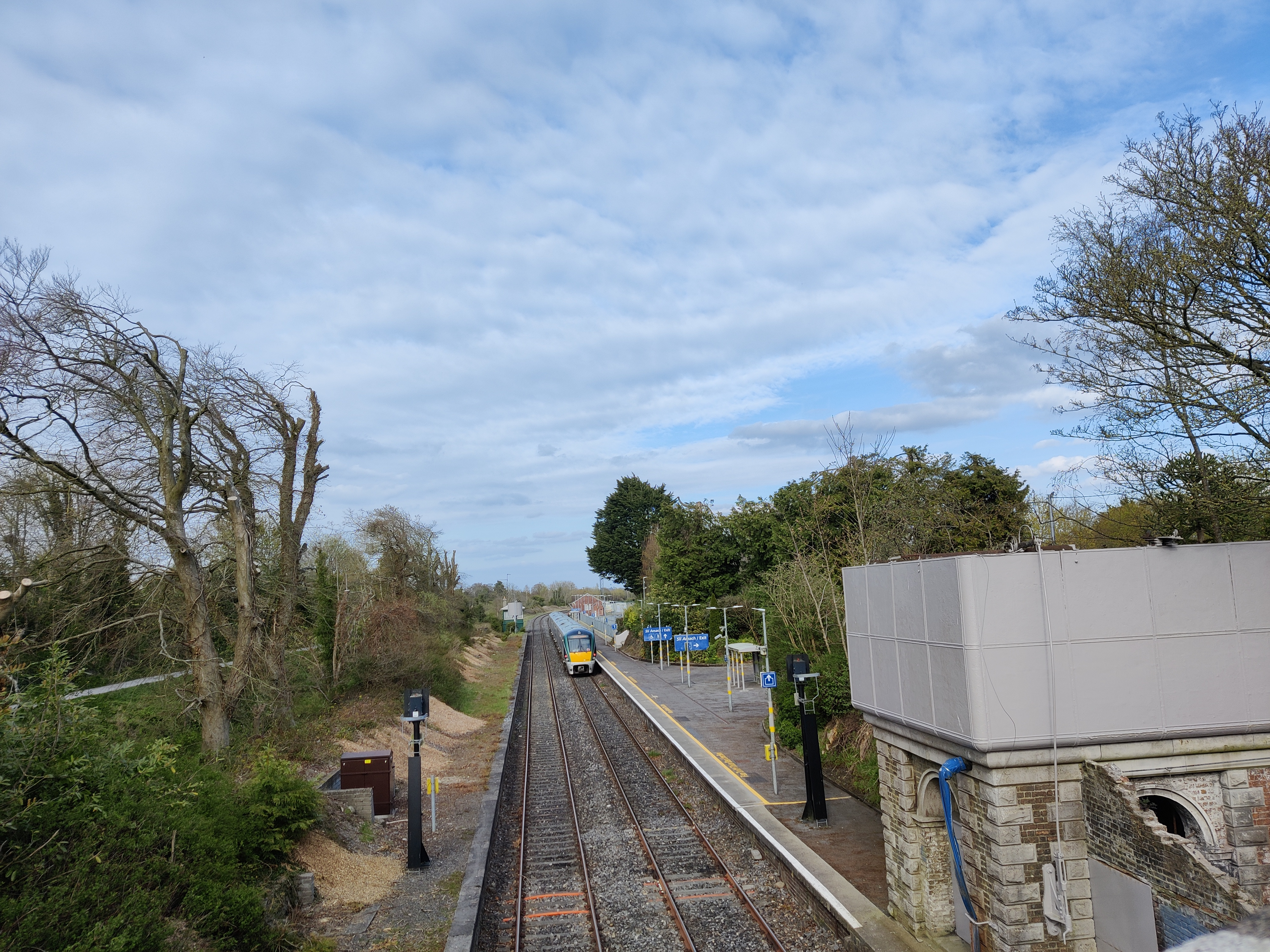
- Enfield, County Meath railway station in 2021.

General information
- Location: Station Yard, Enfield; County Meath, A83 FH48; Ireland
- Coordinates: 53°24′56.7″N 6°50′02.2″W
- Operator: Iarnród Éireann
- Platforms: 2, one abandoned
- Tracks: 2
- Bus operators: Bus Éireann; TFI Local Link
- Connections: 115; 189

Construction
- Structure type: At-grade

Other information
- Station code: ENFLD
- Fare zone: D

Key dates
- 1847: Station opened
- 1963: Station closed
- 1988: Station reopens
Location

Enfield railway station (Irish: Stáisiún traenach Bhóthar Buí) serves the town of Enfield in County Meath, Ireland.

It is a station on the Dublin Connolly to Longford commuter service and Dublin to Sligo Intercity Service. Passengers change at Maynooth to travel to stations on the Dublin to Maynooth and Dublin to M3 Parkway commuter services.

== Description ==
A water tower exists at the Mullingar end of the station, which is now disused. There is also a passing loop. Although no stations now exist between here and Mullingar, a passing loop remains in use at Killucan, between Enfield and Mullingar.

Within Enfield railway station, there are two Porter's Houses, owned by Cravens and McDonalds. The two houses are owned by the families and leased to C.I.E. The McDonald family worked at Enfield railway station within the signal cabin, the Craven family come from a long tradition of families that worked on the railway and built coaches that ran on the railway.

== History ==
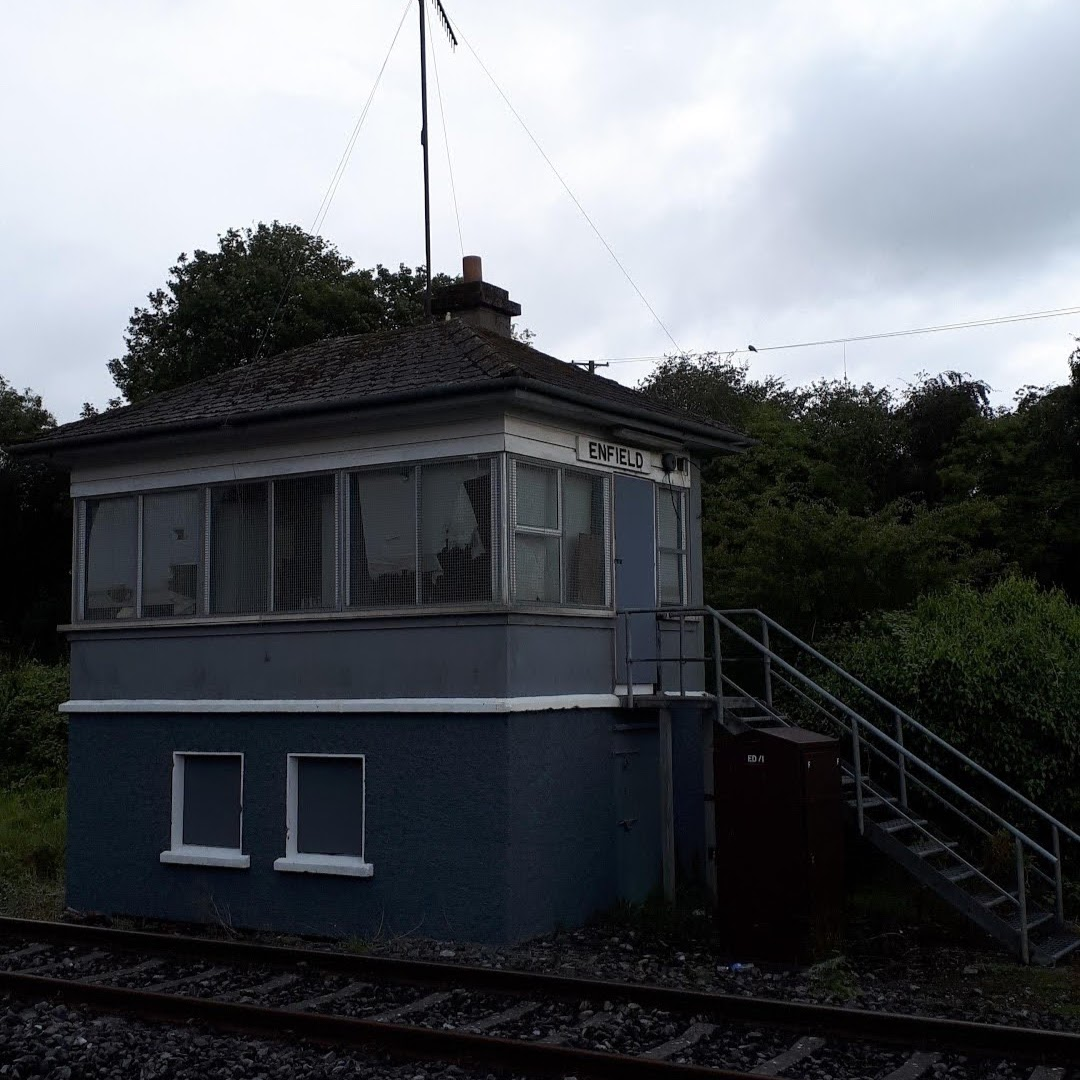
Signal box at Enfield railway station in 2020, now disused.

The railway reached Enfield in 1847, when the Midland Great Western Railway opened between Broadstone Station in Dublin and Enfield railway station (opened on 28 June 1847).

Upon the opening of the railway, canal boats ceased all passenger traffic between Dublin and Enfield. Passengers travelling west used the train to Enfield and transferred to the canal in the town. Both the canal and the railway having stop over points in Enfield, this contributed to the development of the area.

The line was extended to Hill of Down by the end of 1847 and to Mullingar in October 1848. In 1877, a branch line from Nesbitt Junction (about 2 km (1.2 mi) west of Enfield) to Edenderry was opened. The Edenderry branch line and Enfield station closed in 1963, although there had been no regular passenger service to Edenderry since 1931.

Passenger services from Enfield resumed in 1988.

A park and ride facility was opened in 2009.

== See also ==
- List of railway stations in Ireland

Preceding station	Iarnród Éireann	Following station
Kilcock	InterCity; Dublin-Sligo railway line	Mullingar
Kilcock	Commuter; Western Commuter	Mullingar
	Disused railways	
Kilcock	Midland Great Western Railway; Dublin-Galway/Sligo	Moyvalley
