= Leixlip railway station =

Leixlip railway station may refer to one of two stations in Leixlip, County Kildare, Ireland:

- Leixlip Louisa Bridge railway station, opened in 1848
- Leixlip Confey railway station, opened in 1990
