= Parsonstown (disambiguation) =

Parsonstown is the former name of the town of Birr, County Offaly in Ireland.

Parsonstown may also refer to:

- Two townlands in County Kildare:
  - Parsonstown, Ardkill, in the civil parish of Ardkill, barony of Carbury
  - Parsonstown, Donaghcumper, in the civil parish of Donaghcumper, barony of North Salt
- Parsonstown, County Louth, a civil parish and townland in County Louth in the barony of Ferrard
- Parsonstown, County Meath, a townland in County Meath in the civil parish of Rathregan, barony of Ratoath
- Parsonstown, County Westmeath, a townland in the civil parish of Tyfarnham, barony of Corkaree

== See also ==
- Leviathan of Parsonstown, the unofficial name of the Rosse six-foot telescope.
