= Confey College =

Coordinates: 53.373106°N 6.498174°W

- Coláiste Chonfaí
- Leixlip, County Kildare; W23 VH66; Ireland

Information
- Motto: "Meas ar Chách" (Irish for "Respect for all")
- Established: 1986
- Principal: Mike O'Byrne
- Faculty: 50
- Gender: Mixed
- Enrollment: c. 900
- Language: English
- Colours: Blue and white
- Website: www.confeycollege.org

Confey College ^{(Coláiste Chonfaí)} is a co-educational interdenominational vocational school in Leixlip, County Kildare, Ireland. The school opened to 36 students in September 1986 and has approximately 900 students at present and about 80 staff members.

The school is situated at the end of the River Forest Estate. It is one of two secondary-level schools in Leixlip, the other being Coláiste Chiaráin.

== History ==
Before the construction of the original school building in Riverforest in 1994, Confey College teachers taught in nearby Scoil San Carlo on a part-time basis after the primary school closed for the day at 3 pm. After lobbying from teachers and parents, prefabricated buildings were provided on the site which the school currently occupies. With the growth of Leixlip and an expanding teenage population, these facilities were inadequate. With much further teacher and local pressure, what is now the older of the two school buildings was built in 1994, with three prefabs remaining in use as classrooms. The remaining prefabs were removed in 2001 with the construction of a new, larger building.

In February 2011, Mary McAleese made a presidential visit to the school in honour of its 25-year anniversary.

== Green-Schools ==
Confey College has a Green-Schools committee made up of students and teachers, launched in 2009. In 2017, the committee won the Water School of the Year award in the Eastern Midlands region.

== Sport ==
Confey College have an all-weather 'astro turf' pitch. The pitches are used for school teams as well as PE.

In 2010, Confey College's futsal team won the Kildare & Leinster Post Primary Schools Futsal title. They defeated St. Peter's College of Dunboyne 1–0 in the final.

== Notable alumni ==
- Trevor Brennan - rugby player
- David Geraghty - musician
- Jake Carroll - footballer
- Nathan Collins - footballer
- Max Kovalevskis - footballer
