= R149 road (Ireland) =

Road in Ireland

R149 road
- Bóthar R149

Location
- Country: Ireland

Highway system
- Roads in Ireland; Motorways; Primary; Secondary; Regional

The R149 road is a regional road in Ireland from Leixlip, County Kildare to Clonee, County Meath. It starts in Leixlip at the junction with the R148 at Main Street. It passes through Confey in Kildare; Passifyoucan and Barnhill in Fingal and Hilltown in Meath before ending in Clonee at the junction with the R156.

== See also ==
- Roads in Ireland
- National primary road
- National secondary road
