= R148 road (Ireland) =

Road in Ireland

R148 road
- Bóthar R148
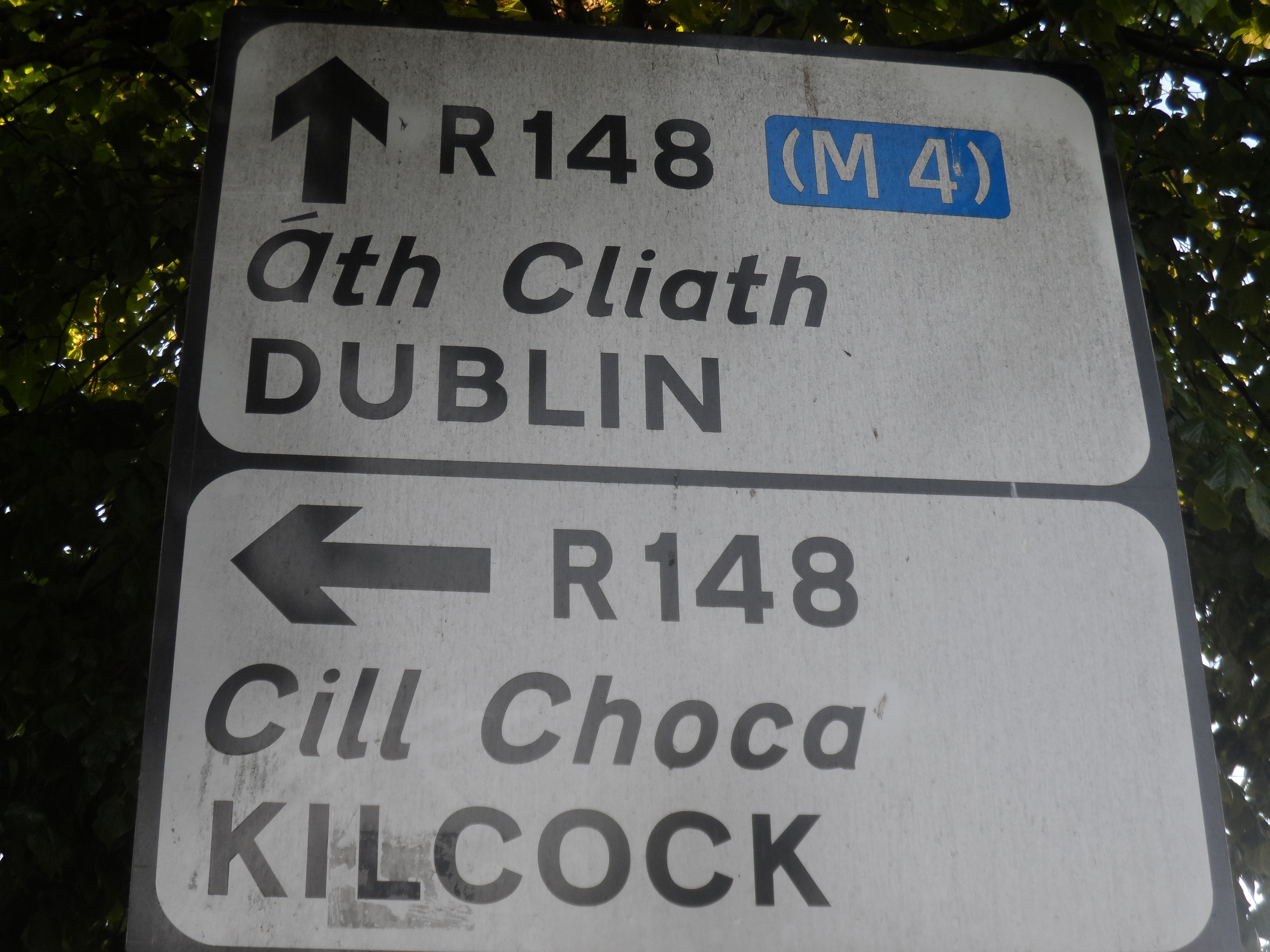

Route information
- Length: 45 km (28 mi)

Location
- Country: Ireland
- Primary destinations: County Dublin; Chapelizod Bypass; Lucan leave N4 in interchange with M4; R403; Crosses the River Liffey at Leixlip Bridge; County Kildare; Leixlip Village Main Street – (R149); Leixlip – (R404); West Leixlip – Crosses the Royal Canal and the Dublin -Sligo railway line at Louisa Bridge; West Leixlip – (R449); East Maynooth – (R157); Maynooth Main Street – (R406), (R408) and crosses the Lyreen River; Kilcock – (R407), (R125); West Kilcock – (R158) then crosses the Royal Canal and Dublin-Sligo railway line; West Kilcock – connects to the M4 via a link road; County Meath; Enfield – (R402), (R159); Crosses into Kildare again at Blackwater Bridge; County Kildare; Moyvalley crosses the Royal Canal and Dublin-Sligo railway again; (R160); Crosses the River Boyne at Leinster Bridge; Clonard; Kinnegad, terminates at the N4 junction where the M4 also terminates

Highway system
- Roads in Ireland; Motorways; Primary; Secondary; Regional

The R148 road is one of Ireland's regional roads which was classified following the opening of a bypassed national primary road.

The section of the old N4 which has been by-passed by the M4 motorway was reclassified R148. The R148 runs from Dublin to Kinnegad in County Westmeath.

The road is 45 km (28 mi) long. It is generally of a very high standard for a regional road, with wide lanes, hard shoulders, and turning bays. It is still heavily used by traffic avoiding the tolled M4 between Kilcock and Kinnegad.

The road was previously categorised as a National Primary route until the opening of the M4 motorway and therefore carried a speed limit of 100 km/h. The speed limit has now been reduced to 80 km/h. The fact that speed limits have been reduced, even though traffic is lighter than before, has led some to claim that the limit reduction is simply a cynical attempt to force motorists to use the tolled M4. This argument is perhaps strengthened by the fact that the R148 received a large share of the speed cameras that were rolled out across Irish roads in 2008. However, under the Road Traffic Act 2004, the default speed limit on Irish regional roads is 80 km/h. A section of the road (between Kilcock and Enfield had for safety reasons already been subject to a special speed limit of 50 mph/80 km/h for some years prior to M4's opening in any case.

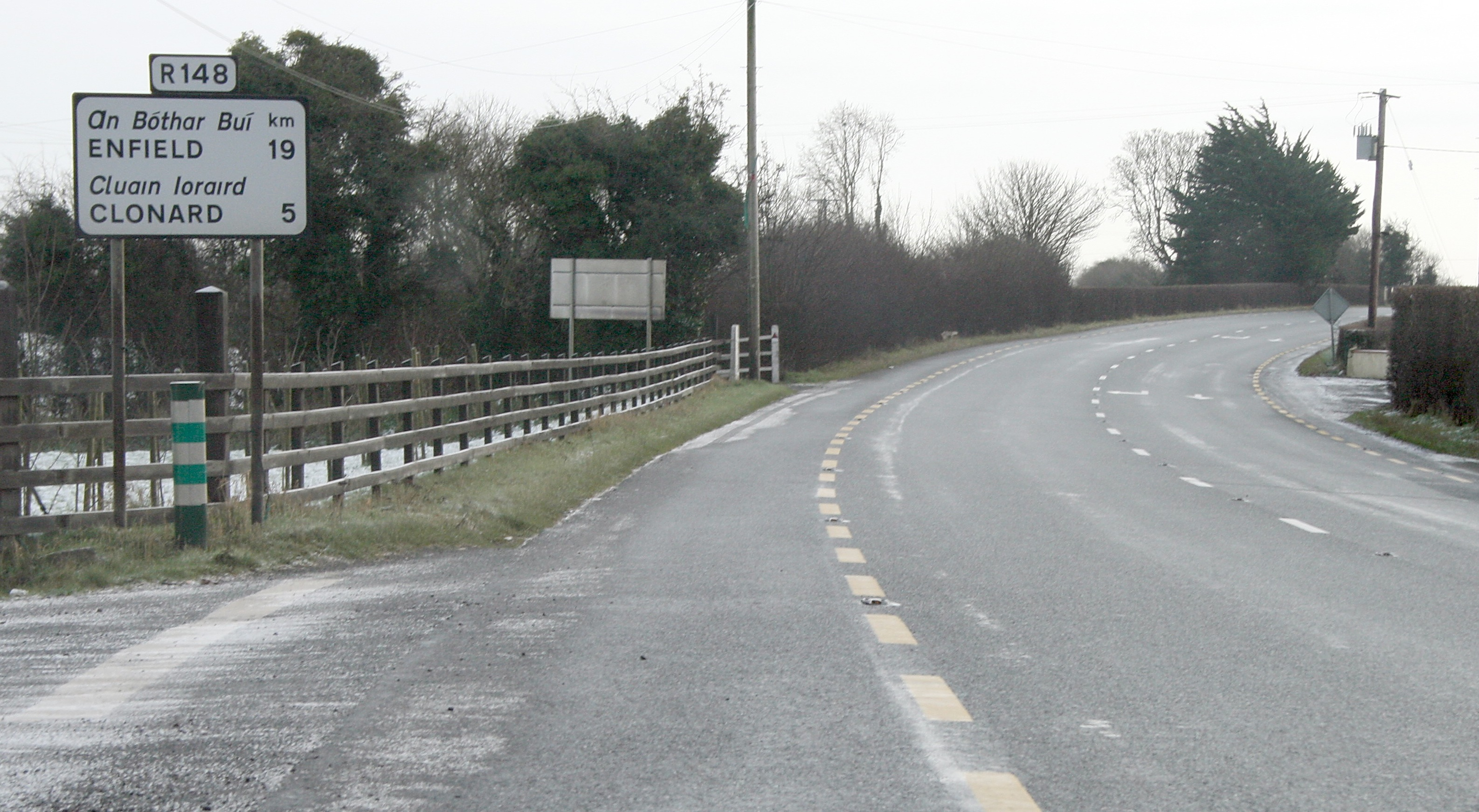
R148 east of Kinnegad Clickable image

== Route ==
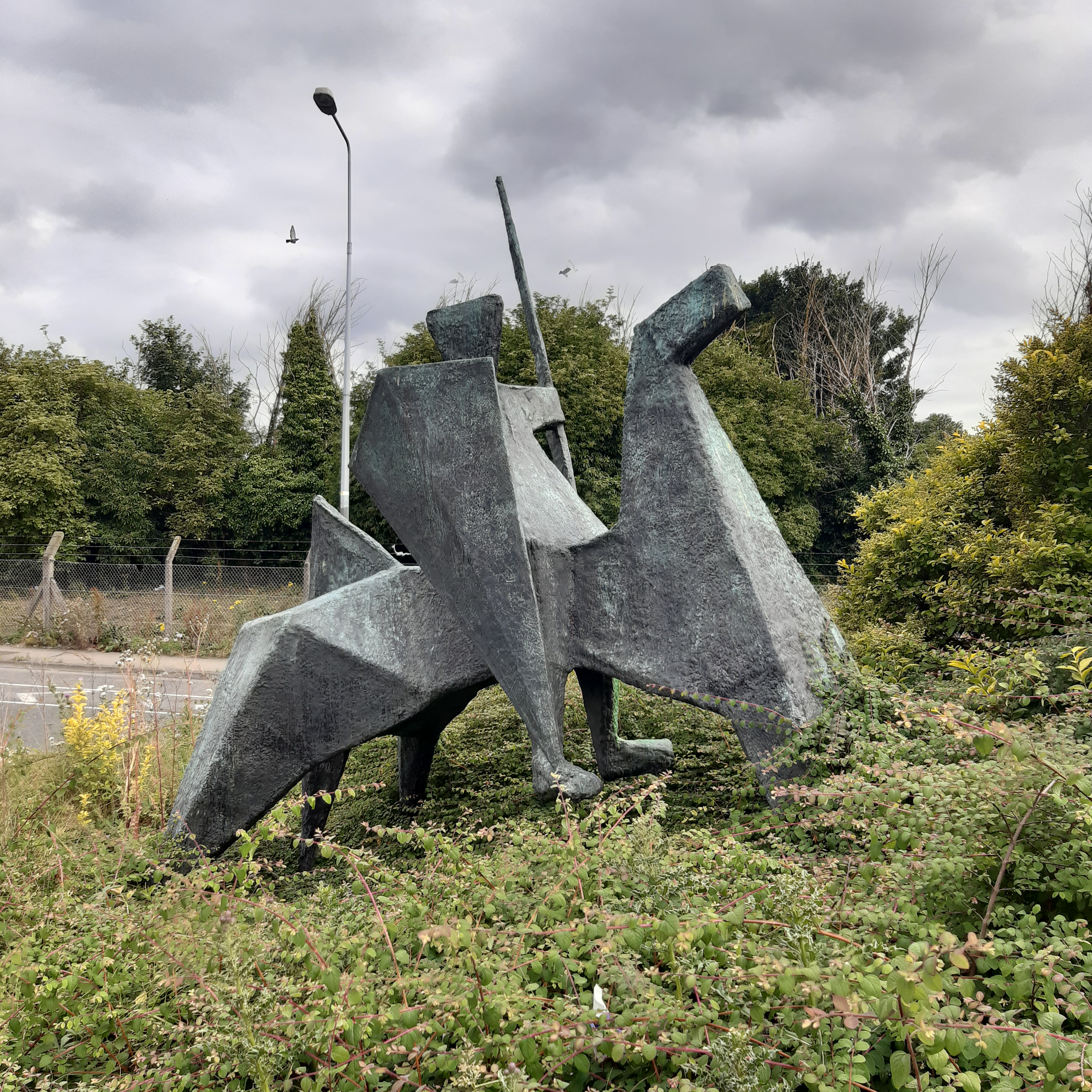
Sculpture opposite the Irish National War Memorial Gardens as the road enters/exits Dublin city centre

The route starts (east-west) at Aston Quay in central Dublin. It then runs to Palmerstown where it becomes the N4. It starts again in Lucan, at the same grade-separated interchange at which the M4 begins. Less than 1 km west it crosses the River Liffey into Leixlip in County Kildare.

It then passes through Leixlip, Maynooth, Kilcock, Enfield, and Clonard before rejoining the N4 west of Kinnegad.

The official description of the R148 from the Roads Act 1993 (Classification of Regional Roads) Order 2012 reads:

R148: Dublin — Kinnegad, County Westmeath (Part of old National Route 4)

Between its junction with R138 at OConnell Bridge in the city of Dublin and its junction with M50 at Palmerstown Upper in the county of South Dublin via Astons Quay, Crampton Quay, Wellington Quay, Essex Quay, Wood Quay, Merchants Quay, Ushers Quay, Ushers Island, Victoria Quay (and via Frank Sherwin Bridge, Wolfe Tone Quay, Sarsfield Quay, Ellis Quay, Arran Quay, Inns Quay, Ormond Quay Upper, Ormond Quay Lower, and Bachelors Walk), Kingsbridge, Saint Johns Road West, Con Colbert Road and Chapelizod Bypass in the city of Dublin: and Redcowfarm in the county of South Dublin

and

between its junction with N4 at Cooldrinagh in the county of South Dublin and its junction with M4 at Heathstown in the county of Westmeath via Leixlip Road in the county of South Dublin: Leixlip Bridge at the boundary between the county of South Dublin and the county of Kildare: Main Street in the town of Leixlip; Collinstown, Blakestown; Dublin Road, Main Street and Mill Street in the town of Maynooth; Maws; Harbour Street, Bridge Street (and via New Lane, The Square and New Road) and Church Street at Kilcock; Allen Bridge and Boycestown in the county of Kildare: Harris’s Bridge at the boundary between the county of Kildare and the county of Meath: Johnstown, Innfield Relief Road, Newcastle and Kilmurry in the county of Meath: Blackwater Bridge at the boundary between the county of Meath and the county of Kildare: Ballynadrumny in the county of Kildare: Leinster Bridge at the boundary between the county of Kildare and the county of Meath: Clonard, Ardnamullen, Hardwood and Rossan in the county of Meath: Kinnegad Bridge at the boundary between the County of Meath and the County of Westmeath: Main Street at Kinnegad; and Correllstown in the county of Westmeath.

== See also ==
- Roads in Ireland
- National primary road
- National secondary road
