= Enfield, County Meath =

Town in Leinster, Ireland

Enfield An Bóthar Buí
- Town
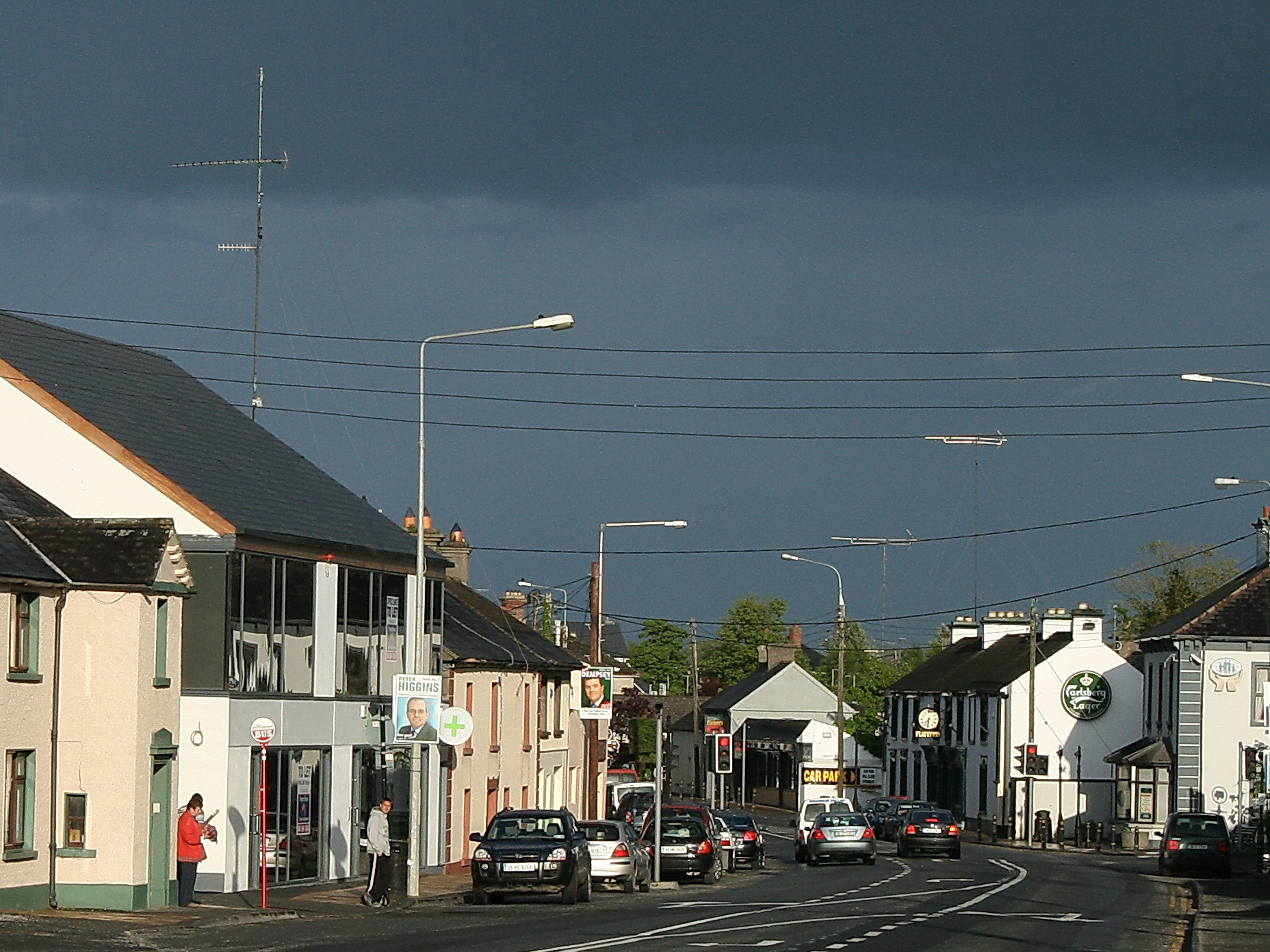
- Enfield

- Location in Ireland
- Coordinates: 53.414°N 6.830°W
- Country: Ireland
- Province: Leinster
- County: County Meath
- Elevation: 77 m (253 ft)

Population (2022)
  - Total: 3,663
- Irish Grid Reference: N775412

Enfield (Irish: An Bóthar Buí, meaning 'the yellow road'), also known as Innfield, is a town in south County Meath, Ireland, situated between Kilcock and Kinnegad and very close to the border with County Kildare. The town is on the Dublin-Sligo railway line. It is located on the R148 regional road, formerly the N4 national primary road connecting Dublin to Connacht.

In the 20 years between the 1996 and 2016 census, the population of Enfield grew considerably from just 566 inhabitants to 3,239 people. This increase is due to its location on the commuter belt to Dublin. Similarly to many other dormitory towns in this vicinity, numerous housing estates have been constructed, with 2016 census numbers indicating that 80% of the town's housing stock (826 of 1,024 households) was built between 1991 and 2010. By the 2022 census, population had increased to 3,663.

== Name ==
The village's Irish name, An Bóthar Buí (the yellow road), is derived from the yellow mud that formed on the main street of the village through a combination of rain and the churning effect of the wheels of the stagecoach on the soil. Another theory is that the name arose from the yellow colour of the ragwort vegetation at the sides of the road.

== History ==
Enfield's phased growth is paralleled with the various phases of transport history throughout south County Meath. Going back to Ancient Times, prior to and during the early part of the first millennium A.D., the Enfield area is believed to have been situated on one of the main roads to Tara, the coronation site and seat of the High Kings of Ireland from the 3rd century until 1022. From the great heart and centre of the Irish Kingdom, five great arteries or roads radiated from Tara to the various parts of the country, namely, the Slighe (a way or path) Cualann, which ran toward the present County Wicklow, the Slighe Mór, the great Western road, which ran via Dublin to Galway, the Slighe Asail, which ran near the present Mullingar, the Slighe Dala, which ran southwest, and the Slighe Midluachra, the Northern road.

During Norman times (from 1169) under the Fitzgeralds, Earls of Kildare, a road was built from Maynooth Castle to Courtown House in Kilcock, to the Windmill on Cappagh Hill, to Cloncurry over to Johnstown House (now the Johnstown House Hotel and Spa), and from there on to Newcastle and Balyna House.

When the stagecoach was used as a form of transport in Ireland, this road took a slightly different route to include the area that is now known as Enfield. The road between Dublin and Mullingar running through Enfield was built in 1735.

A livery stable and courtyard existed opposite the old post office building (now a Chinese restaurant) at the east end of the town, to service people travelling on this road. Fresh teams of horses were available for hire at the livery stable when the coaches stopped at the post office. The building also provided some stopover accommodation. Some of the remains of the original livery courtyard could be seen adjacent to the SuperValu (formerly Centra) supermarket and car park. These sites were protected once by the Office of Public Works, but have made way for redevelopment in 2014. The first postal deliveries by stagecoach, in the area, occurred around 1740, during the time of Robert Fitzgerald, 19th Earl of Kildare.

In the 1790s, maps denote the site as "A New Inn", later "The New Inn" and eventually, Innfield. This derives from a mail-coach inn on the 18th century Dublin to Mullingar coach route called "The Royal Oak Inn", which is estimated to have been where the Bridge House Inn now stands. The Royal Canal also passed through Innfield, and with the arrival of the Midland Great Western Railway, the name became anglicised to Enfield. The name Innfield became Enfield towards the end of the 19th Century when a new postmaster came from Enfield, Middlesex, England and decided to use the same name for the area. The N4, the main road to the west from Dublin, passed through Enfield and plagued it with traffic problems. In December 2005, a new stretch of the M4 motorway opened and most traffic now bypasses the town. The section of the N4 which was bypassed has been redesignated as the R148.

In 2013, St. Mary's National School was redeveloped and officially opened by Enda Kenny and Bishop Michael Smith of the Meath Diocese.

== Transport ==
=== Canal ===
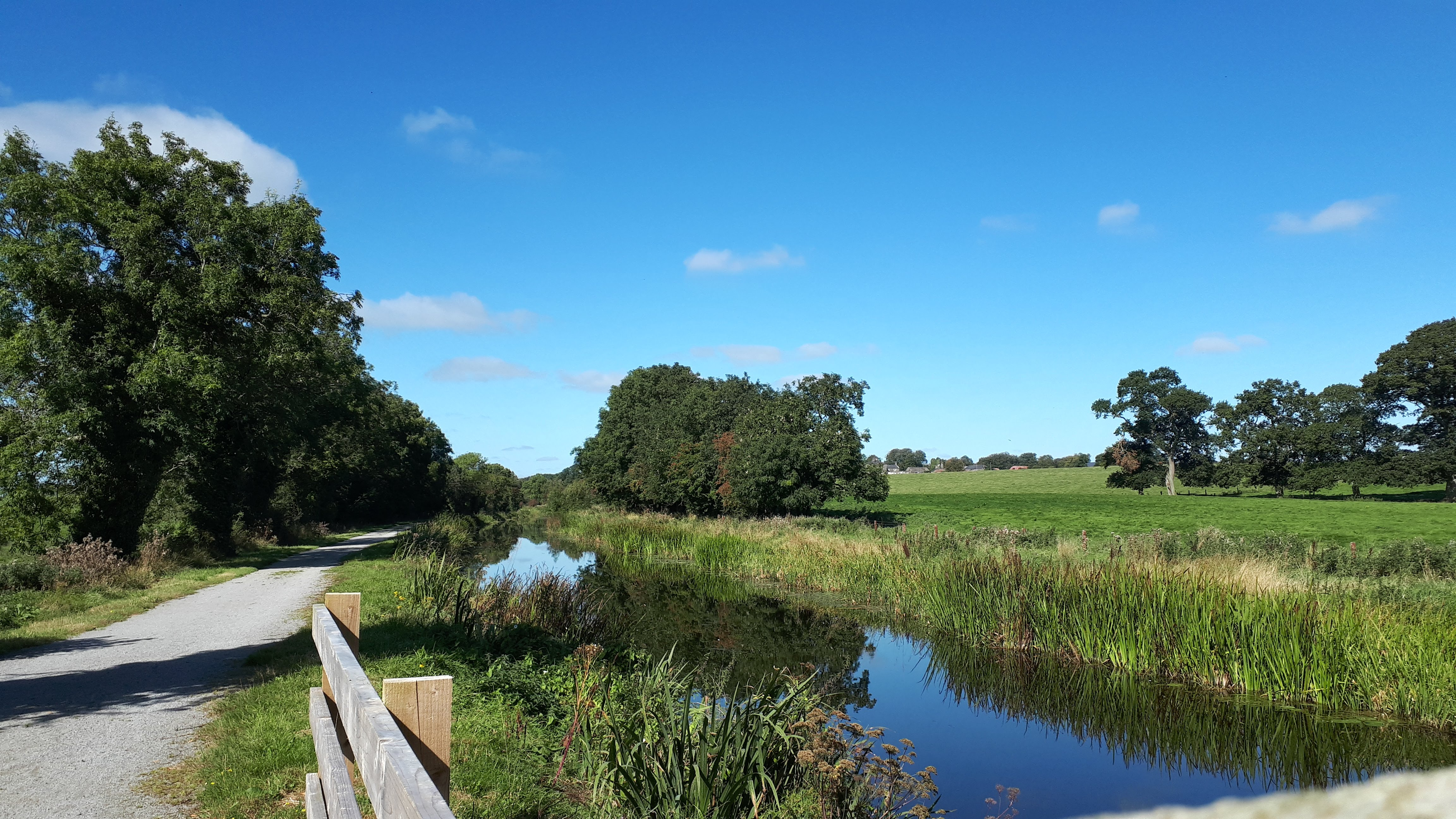
Royal Canal near Enfield, County Meath

The Royal Canal construction began in Dublin in 1790 and signaled the end of the stagecoach era, as the canals were a cheaper and more efficient means of transport. The stretch from Dublin to Mullingar opened as a trade route around 1807 and the canal eventually reached the Shannon in 1817, though the company was heavily in debt. The decision by the Duke of Leinster to build a spur from the canal to his country residence at Carton House was one of the contributing factors which finally broke the company.

Even though rail travel was quicker, the canal continued to carry traffic until the 1950s. The Office of Public Works took charge of it in 1986, and subsequent investment and significant restoration are aimed at making it popular again as a means of leisurely transport.

=== Railway ===
The railway reached Enfield in 1847, when the Midland Great Western Railway opened between Broadstone Station in Dublin and Enfield railway station (opened on 28 June 1847).

Upon the opening of the railway, canal boats ceased all passenger traffic between Dublin and Enfield, passengers travelling west using the train to Enfield and transferring to the canal in the town. Both the canal and the railway had stopover points in Enfield, and this contributed to the development of the area.

The line was extended to Hill of Down by the end of 1847 and to Mullingar in October 1848. In 1877, a branch line from Nesbitt Junction (about 2 km (1.2 mi) west of Enfield) to Edenderry was opened. The Edenderry branch line and Enfield station closed in 1963, although there had been no regular passenger service to Edenderry since 1931.

Passenger services from Enfield resumed in 1988.

Enfield is located on the Sligo to Dublin rail line with termini at Sligo Mac Diarmada and Dublin Connolly, operated by Irish Rail. As of 9 December 2018, there are 10 trains into Dublin city centre & 9 westbound trains Monday to Friday, 7 trains to Dublin & 7 trains westbound on Saturdays, and on Sundays, there are 6 trains to Dublin & 6 trains westbound.

=== Bus ===
Enfield is served by Bus Éireann route 115 (Mullingar/Enfield) to Dublin) and Irish Citylink route 763 (Dublin to Galway), in addition to less regular routes run by Kearns and Mullally's.

== Local amenities ==
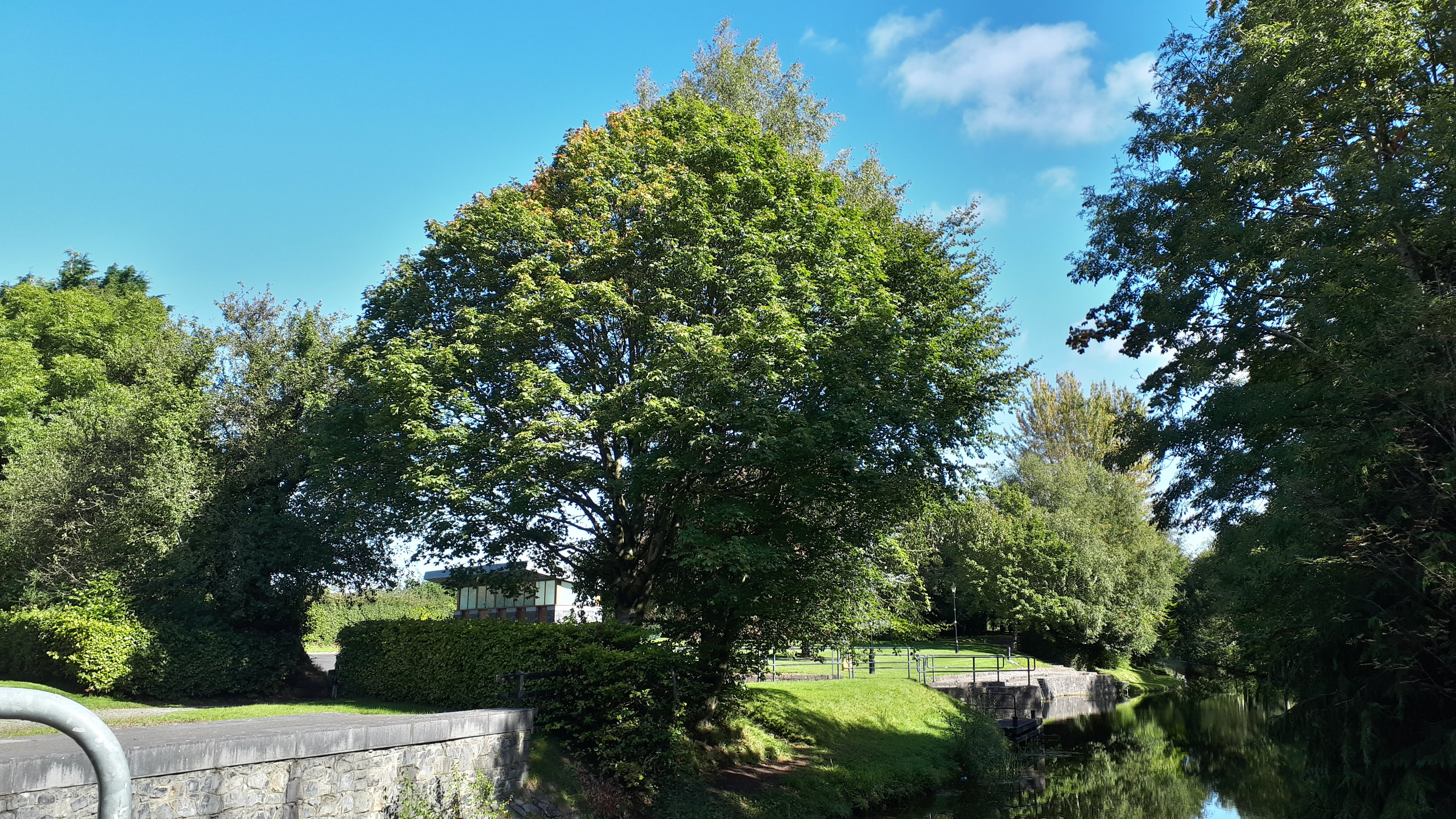
Enfield Harbour, County Meath

There is an amenity park along with a small harbour and slipway at the Royal Canal on the western side of the town. The local swimming pool and gym is in the Johnstown House Estate.

== Sport ==
Enfield is located near The Rathcore Golf and Country Club and the Darren Clarke-designed Champions Club in Moyvalley.

Na Fianna CLG (established in 2000) is the local Gaelic Athletic Association club. The town is also home to Enfield Celtic Football Club, established in 1989.

== Notable people ==
- Teresa Brayton (1868–1943), Irish nationalist, writer and poet, born in Kilbrook, near Enfield. Her best-known poem is The Old Bog Road.
- Tony Brennan, former Meath football selector and player
- Sarah Carey, journalist and political commentator
- Peter Coffey (1876–1943), Roman Catholic Priest and neo-scholastic philosopher, born in Rathrone, near Enfield
- David Foster, former Irish Olympian equestrian
- Seamus McDonagh, former professional boxer, raised in Enfield
- Luke McNally, professional footballer
- Sir William Welles (1409/10–1461), former Lord Chancellor of Ireland

== See also ==
- List of towns and villages in Ireland.
