= R404 road =

R404 road may refer to:

- R404 road (Ireland)
- R404 road (South Africa)
