= Max Kovalevskis =

Irish footballer (born 2008)

Personal information
- Full name: Maxim Kovalevskis
- Date of birth: 9 February 2008 (age 18)
- Place of birth: Maynooth, Ireland
- Height: 1.80 m (5 ft 11 in)
- Position: Winger

Team information
- Current team: Shamrock Rovers
- Number: 38

Youth career
- –2020: Leixlip United
- 2020–2022: Cherry Orchard
- 2022–: Shamrock Rovers

Senior career*
Years	Team	Apps	(Gls)
2024–	Shamrock Rovers	10	(0)

International career^{‡}
2022–2023	Republic of Ireland U15	8	(1)
2023–2024	Republic of Ireland U16	5	(1)
2025	Republic of Ireland U17	7	(1)
2026–	Republic of Ireland U19	5	(0)
- * Club domestic league appearances and goals as of 17:40, 9 November 2026 (UTC) ‡ National team caps and goals as of 14:40, 15 November 2026 (UTC)

Maxim Kovalevskis (born 9 February 2008) is an Irish professional footballer who plays as a winger for League of Ireland Premier Division club Shamrock Rovers.

== Club career ==
=== Youth career ===
A native of Maynooth, County Kildare, Kovalevskis attended secondary school at Confey College and played Gaelic football with Maynooth GAA and began playing football with Leixlip United, then moved to Cherry Orchard before joining the academy of League of Ireland club Shamrock Rovers in April 2022.

=== Shamrock Rovers ===
On 29 April 2024, Kovalevskis made his first team debut for Shamrock Rovers, replacing Darragh Burns from the bench in the 68th minute of their 4–0 league win over Drogheda United at Tallaght Stadium. He made 5 appearances on the way to helping his side to win the 2025 League of Ireland Premier Division title.

== International career ==
As well as the Republic of Ireland, Kovalevskis is also eligible to represent Latvia through his father's nationality and Ukraine through his mother's nationality.

On 19 October 2022, he made his international debut, starting for the Republic of Ireland U15 side in a 2–1 win over Cyprus U15 in Croatia. On 26 September 2023, he made his debut for the Republic of Ireland U16s in a 6–1 win over Estonia U16. His Republic of Ireland U17 debut came on 9 June 2025, in a 3–0 win over Croatia U17. Kovalevskis was named in the squad for the 2025 FIFA U-17 World Cup in Qatar in November 2025. On 5 November 2025, he scored in a 4–1 win over Panama U17 in his side's first World Cup game. 3 days later, he was substituted off at half time in a 2–1 win over Uzbekistan U17 with a concussion, with the FIFA return to play protocol meaning that he would miss the rest of the tournament.

== Career statistics ==
As of match played on 7 August 2026

Appearances and goals by club, season and competition
Club	Division	Season	League		National Cup		Europe		Other		Total	
Club	Division	Season	Apps	Goals	Apps	Goals	Apps	Goals	Apps	Goals	Apps	Goals
Shamrock Rovers	2024	LOI Premier Division	1	0	0	0	0 (Note: Appearance(s) in the UEFA Conference League)	0	0 (Note: Appearance(s) in the Leinster Senior Cup)	0	1	0
Shamrock Rovers	2025	LOI Premier Division	5	0	0	0	2	0	0	0	7	0
Shamrock Rovers	2026	LOI Premier Division	4	0	1	1	0	0	2 (Note: 1 appearance in the President of Ireland's Cup; 1 appearance in the Leinster Senior Cup)	0	7	1
Career total			10	0	1	1	2	0	2	0	15	1

== Honours ==
Shamrock Rovers

- League of Ireland Premier Division: 2025, 2026
