= Kilcock railway station =

Railway station in Kilcock, Ireland

Kilcock Cill Choca
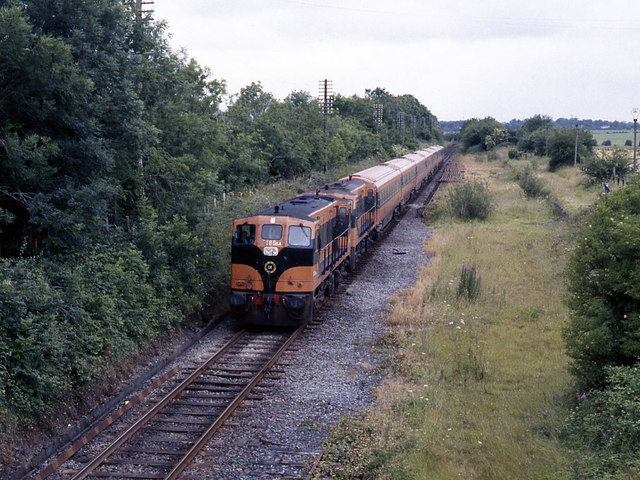
- Train passing the site of the 1850-1963 station

General information
- Location: Bridge Street, Kilcock, County Kildare; Ireland
- Coordinates: 53°23′56.5″N 6°40′07.8″W
- Operator: Iarnród Éireann
- Platforms: 1

Construction
- Structure type: At-grade
- Accessible: Yes

Other information
- Station code: KCOCK
- Fare zone: Suburban 5

Key dates
- 1847: Station opened
- 1963: Station closed
- 1998: Station reopens
Location

Kilcock railway station serves the town of Kilcock in County Kildare, Ireland.

It is a station on the Dublin Connolly to Longford Commuter service and Dublin to Sligo InterCity service. Passengers change at Maynooth to travel to stations on the Dublin to Maynooth and Dublin to M3 Parkway Commuter services.

== History ==
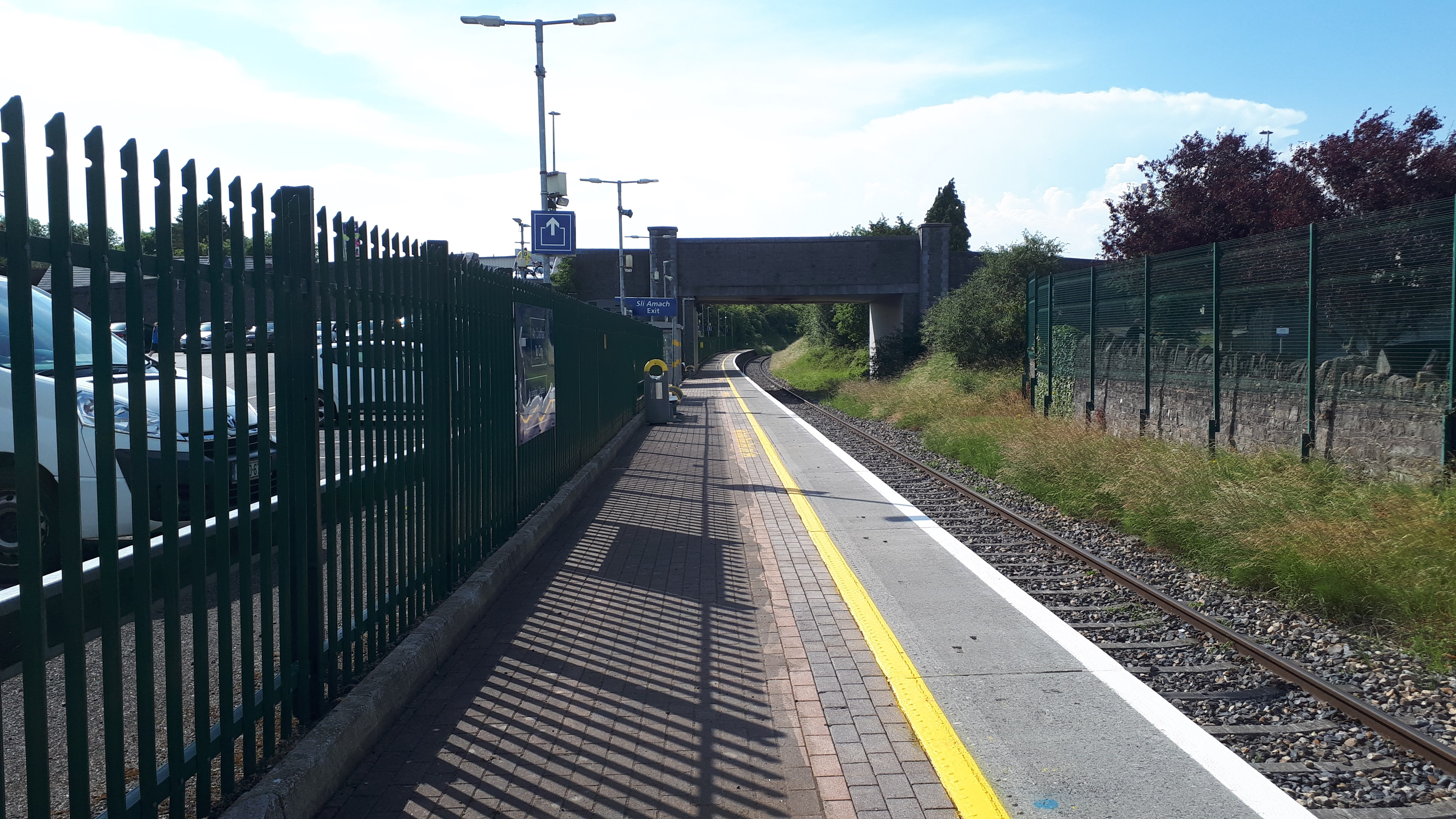
Kilcock railway station in 2020.

The first station opened on 28 June 1847, and was replaced by a new station on 1 July 1848, which closed to regular passenger traffic on 10 November 1947. The current station, under Shaw Bridge, opened in 1998.

== See also ==
- List of railway stations in Ireland

Preceding station	Iarnród Éireann	Following station
Maynooth	InterCity; Dublin-Sligo	Enfield
Maynooth	Commuter; Western Commuter	Enfield
