= Leixlip (civil parish) =

Irish civil parish and townland

Leixlip (Irish: Léim an Bhradáin, meaning 'Salmon's leap') is a civil parish and a townland located in the north-eastern corner of County Kildare, Ireland. The civil parish is mainly in the ancient barony of Salt North with a small part in the neighbouring barony of Newcastle. It is centred on the town of Leixlip. In geology, the parish rests on a substratum of limestone, and contains chalybeate springs. It lies at the confluence of the River Liffey and the Rye Water.

== History ==
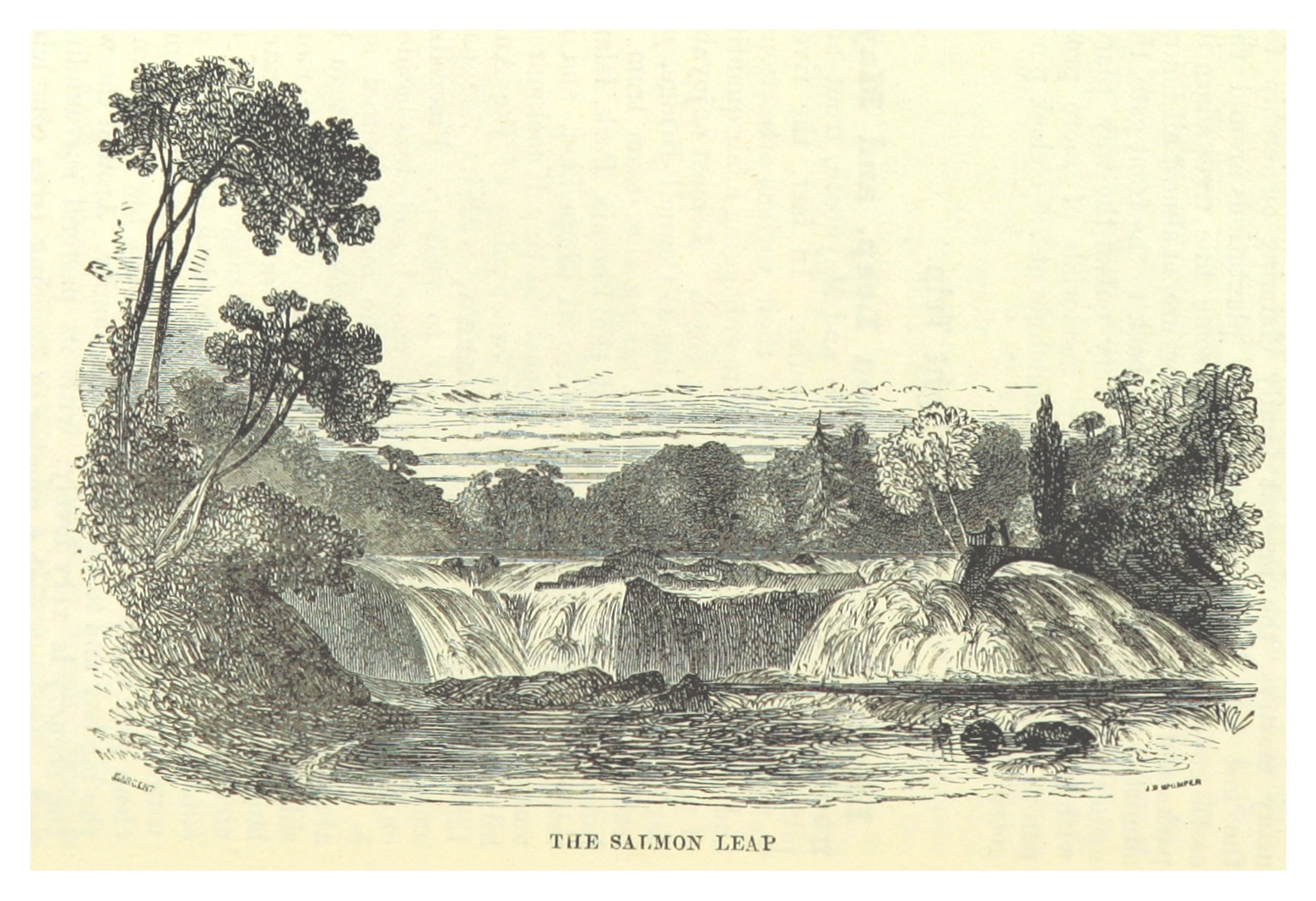
1891 portrait of the Salmon Leap Waterfall

According to Lewis' Topography of Ireland (1837), the parish contained 1624 inhabitants, of which 1159 were in the town and it comprised 7974 statute acres. The soil was recorded as "good" with a considerable portion of the land being "in pasture for fattening stock for the Dublin, Liverpool, and Bristol markets, and the remainder is under tillage". Lewis recorded that the living was a rectory and vicarage in the patronage of the Archbishop. The tithes of the parish amounted to £600. The glebe house was built in 1822 by a loan of £562 from the Board of First Fruits. The building stills stands and the National Register notes that:

"It is a fine and imposing house that, despite a subsequent change of ownership and use, retains most of its original form and character." (Note: Leixlip Glebe House (former), Pound Street, Leixlip - Register number 11804040)

.

The parish's eponymous "salmon leap" was a 5-metre waterfall on the Liffey, upstream from the village. In 1945, a hydroelectric dam was built on the site and its reservoir flooded the waterfall. The dam generates 4 Megawatts of electricity.

=== Ecclesiastical parishes ===
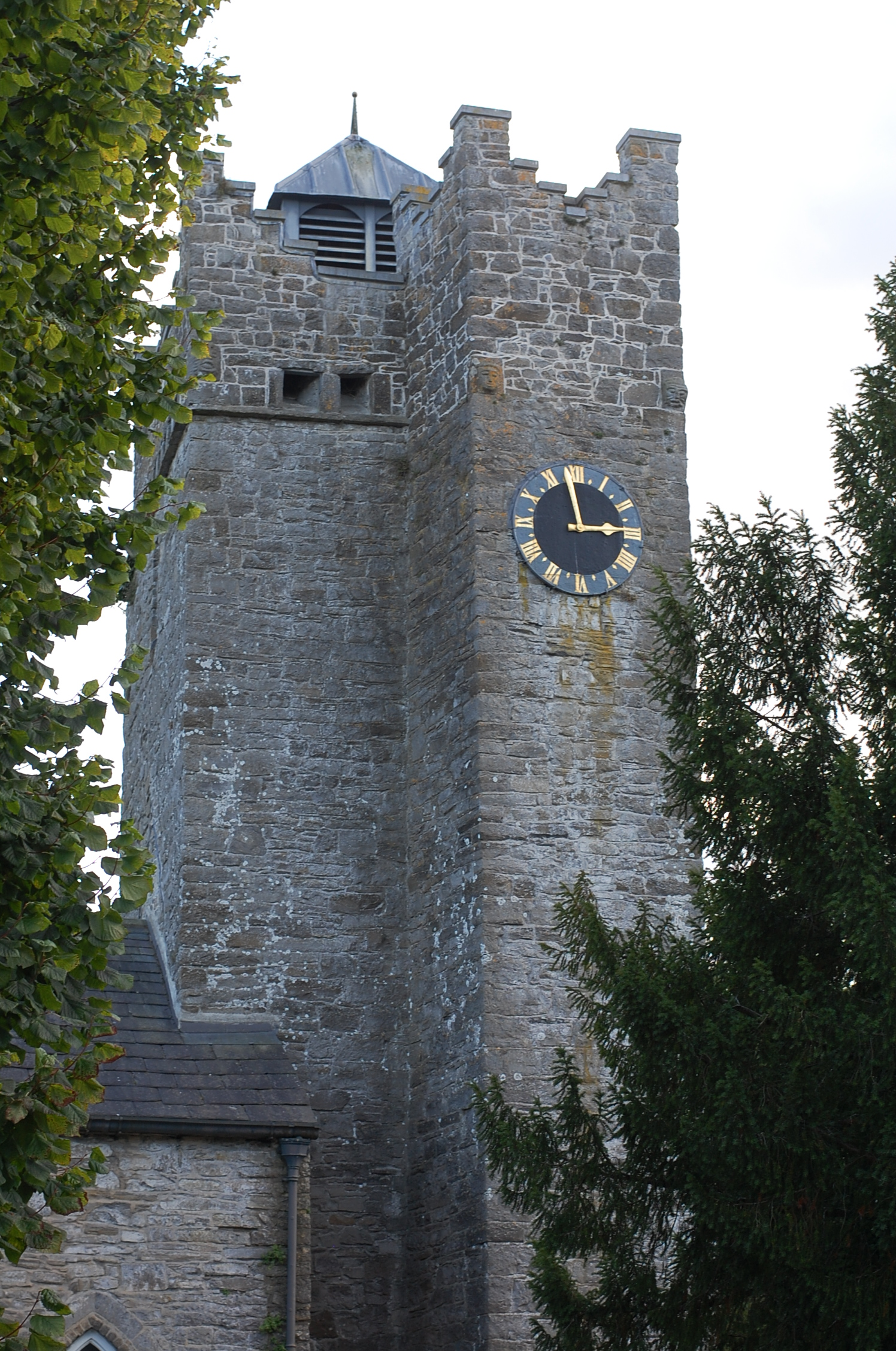
St. Mary's church in the Church of Ireland

Like all civil parishes, this civil parish is derived from, and co-extensive with a pre-existing ecclesiastical parish of the same name, as used in the Church of Ireland. In the Archdiocese of Dublin, the parish is today united with Lucan in the "Leixlip Union of Parishes". (Note: Church of Ireland - Leixlip Union of Parishes) St. Mary's church is located off the Main Street. The building - a listed national monument - was constructed between 1780 and 1820. (Note: Saint Mary's Church, Main Street, Leixlip - Register number 11804017)

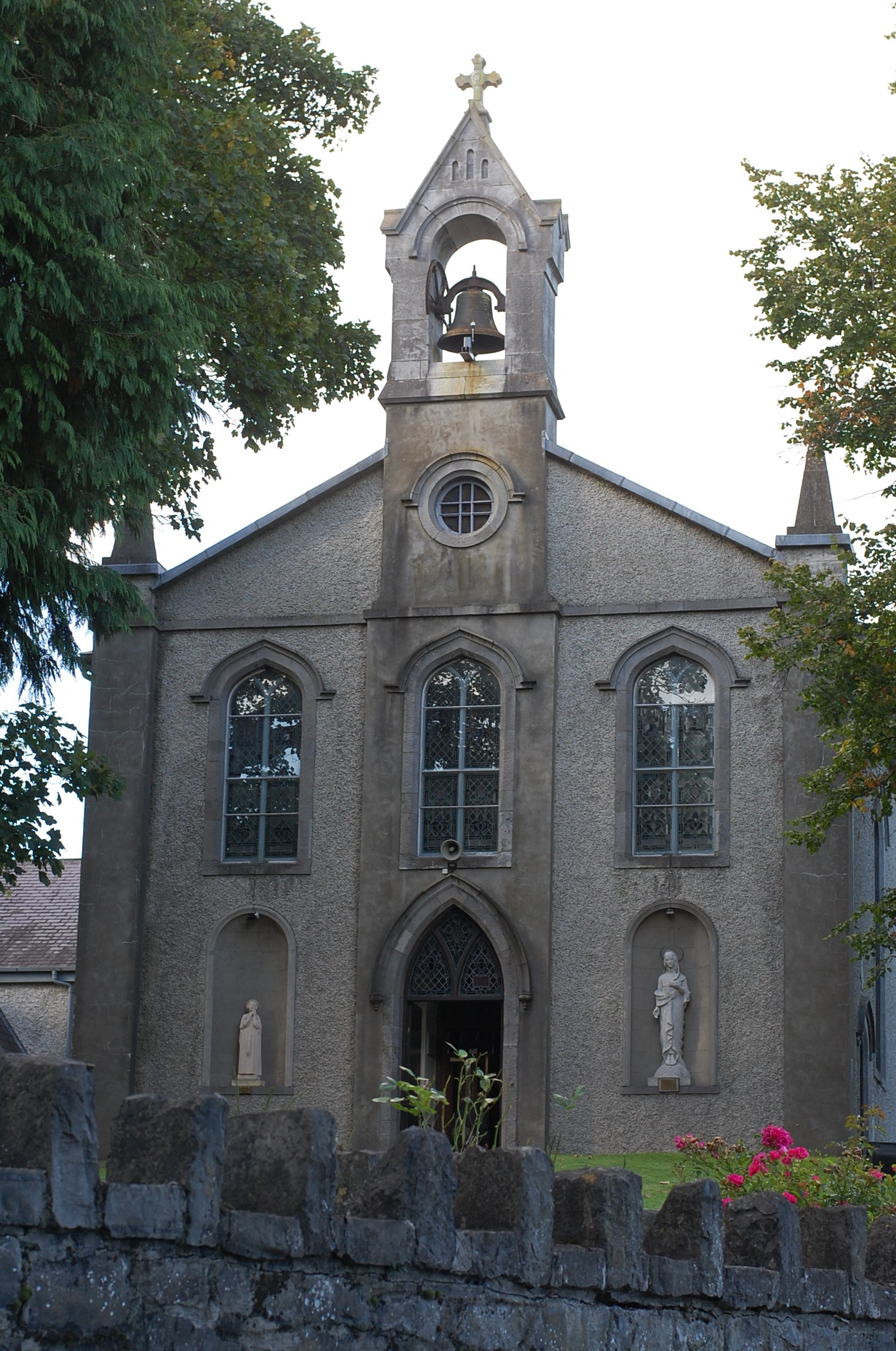
Church of Our Lady's Nativity in the Catholic Church

In the Catholic Church, the civil parish is divided between the ecclesiastical parishes of Leixlip and Confey in the Archdiocese of Dublin. (Note: Leixlip parish) The church building in Leixlip parish, "Our Lady's Nativity", (Note: Our Lady's Nativity Catholic Church, Pound Street, Old Hill, Leixlip - Register number 11804033) is located on Pound Street, Old Hill. It was constructed between 1830 and 1840 and is named in honour of the Nativity of Our Lady. (Note: Catholic Church - Leixlip parish) The church building in Confey parish, "St. Charles Borromeo", is located on "Captain's Hill". (Note: Confey parish) The parish was constituted in 1984 from Leixlip under the care of the Redemptorists and the church was named in honour of St. Charles Borromeo (Note: Catholic Church - Confey parish)

== Townlands ==
There are thirteen townlands in the parish. Six of these are located in the barony of Newcastle. While this barony is mostly situated in South Dublin, a small part north of the River Liffey lies in the modern county of Fingal. The remaining seven townlands are located in the barony of Salt North which is situated in County Kildare. For convenience, the table below groups the parish's townlands by barony. The barony also indicates the townlands' location in one of the modern local authority areas.

| Barony Modern County | Name in Irish | Name in English | Acres |
|---|---|---|---|
| Newcastle; Fingal | Coill Alain | Allenswood | 210 |
| Newcastle; Fingal | - | Coldblow | 279 |
| Newcastle; Fingal | Láithreach Con | Laraghcon | 295 |
| Newcastle; Fingal | - | Pass-If-You-Can | 88 |
| Newcastle; Fingal | Páirc San Caitríona | Saint Catherine's Park | 195 |
| Newcastle; Fingal | Baile an Bhaspailigh | Westmanstown | 437 |
| Salt North; County Kildare | Halla an Sciobóil | Barnhall | 224 |
| Salt North; County Kildare | Baile Choilín | Collinstown | 197 |
| Salt North; County Kildare | - | Easton | 134 |
| Salt North; County Kildare | Diméin Léim an Bhradáin | Leixlip Demesne | 238 |
| Salt North; County Kildare | Léim an Bhradáin | Leixlip | 604 |
| Salt North; County Kildare | An Baile Nua | Newtown | 216 |
| Salt North; County Kildare | Páirc San Caitríona | Saint Catherine's Park | 75 |

Note: There are three adjacent townlands of the same name - Saint Catherine's Park; two are located in Salt North (one in the parish of Leixlip and the other in the parish of Confey); the remaining townland is also in the parish of Leixlip but in the barony of Newcastle.

== Features ==
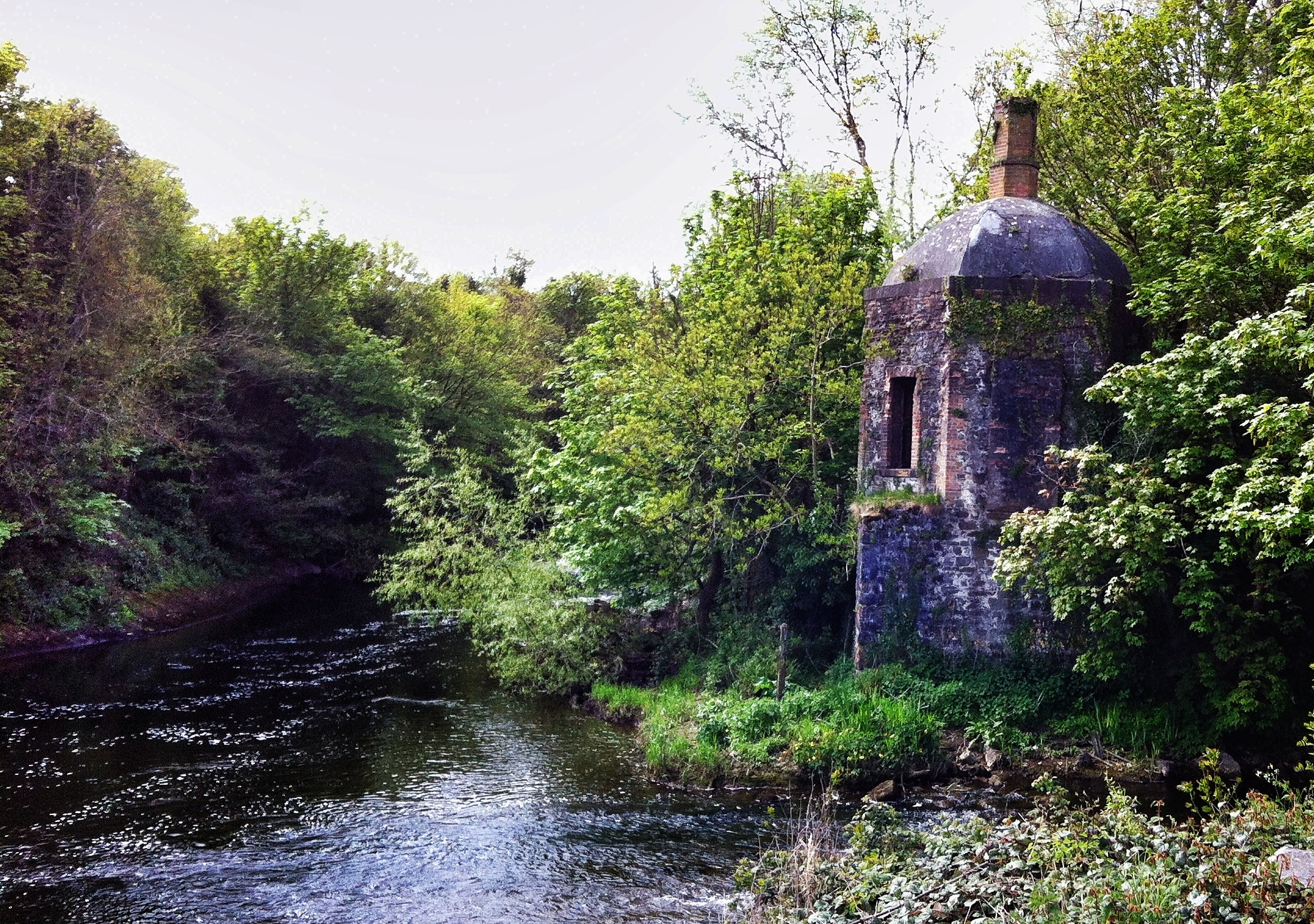
Confluence of the Rye (right) with the Liffey (centre to left), at the boathouse of Leixlip Castle

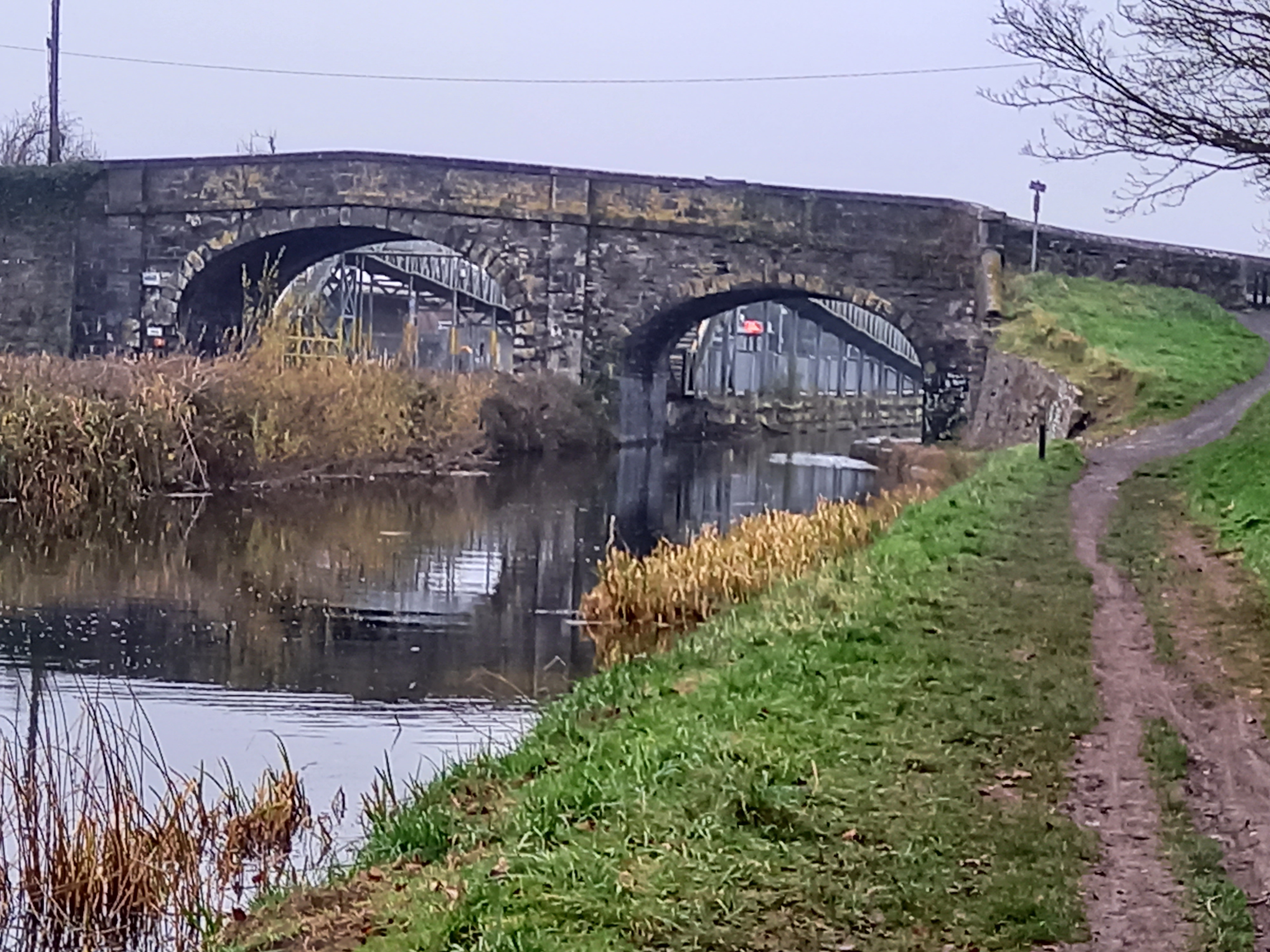
Cope Bridge with Confey station visible under the arches

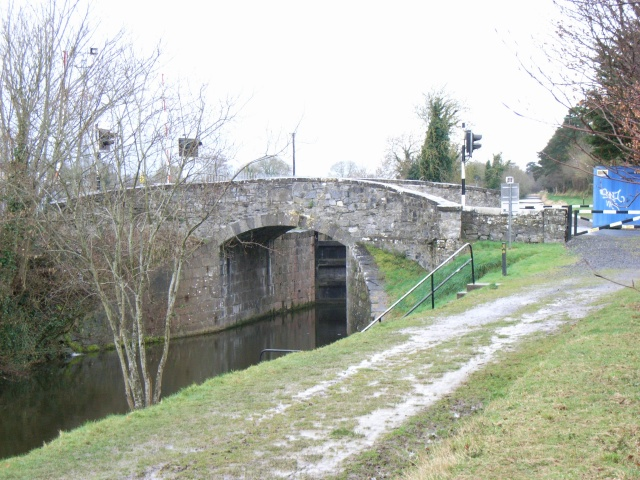
Deey Bridge at Collinstown townland

The River Liffey, flowing from west to east, forms the southern boundary of the parish. From the north-western corner of the parish, the Rye Water flows in a south-easterly direction until its confluence with the Liffey at the western edge of the village's Main Street. Near Louisa Bridge railway station, the Rye Water receives water from the Leixlip Spa. It also receives an overflow from the Royal Canal. The Rye then flows under the canal, which is carried in the Leixlip aqueduct almost 100 feet (30m) above. The aqueduct, an earth embankment, took six years to construct in the 1790s. Before entering the village, in the 18th and 19th centuries the river powered some mills. In 1758, the site was used as a linen printing mill. Later it powered the Rye Vale Distillery which produced more than 20,000 gallons of whiskey in 1837.

Louisa Bridge is linked to a series of stations by the "Royal Canal Way" which is a 144-kilometre (89-mile) long-distance trail that follows the towpath of the canal from Ashtown, Dublin to Cloondara, County Longford. Two kilometres to the east of Louisa Bridge, the canal is crossed by Cope Bridge. In 1990, a new railway station - Leixlip Confey - was constructed here in the townland of Newtown.

In the most westerly townland of the parish - Collinstown - is found Deey Bridge and the 13th lock of the canal. Intel Ireland is located in a large industrial estate in the townland.

On a prominence above the Liffey / Rye confluence stands "Leixlip Castle", one of the oldest continuously inhabited castles in Ireland. It is downstream of the salmon leap waterfall, now flooded. The castle is currently the residence of members of the Guinness family.
