= Peter Coffey =

The Reverend Peter Coffey
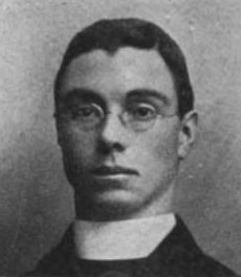
- Born: 9 April 1876; Rathrone, Enfield, Ireland
- Died: 7 January 1943 (aged 66); Maynooth, Ireland

Education
- Education: Maynooth College; University of Louvain; University of Strasbourg

Philosophical work
- Era: Contemporary philosophy
- Region: Western philosophy
- School: Neo-scholasticism
- Institutions: Maynooth College

Peter Coffey (9 April 1876 – 7 January 1943) was an Irish Catholic priest and neo-scholastic philosopher.

== Life ==
Coffey was educated at the Meath Diocesan Seminary in Navan, and St Patrick's College, Maynooth (Maynooth College). He studied for his doctorate at the University of Louvain, and attended the University of Strasbourg. He was ordained in 1900.

He was Professor of Logic and Metaphysics at Maynooth College from 1902 until his death. In his time, Coffey was considered one of the foremost Catholic intellectuals in Ireland. He authored a number of books, including manuals of Thomistic philosophy:

- The Inductive Sciences, an Inquiry into Some of Their Methods and Postulates (Dublin, 1910)
- The Science of Logic, 2 vols. (London, 1912)
- Ontology: The Theory of Being (1912)
- Epistemology, 2 vols. (London, 1917)

His manuals were widely used in the education of Roman Catholic priests and theologians in the English-speaking world, up until roughly the 1960s, but have since been largely ignored. He was a contributor of articles on philosophical subjects to the Irish Ecclesiastical Record, and to the Catholic Encyclopedia.

The only book review that Ludwig Wittgenstein ever published, in 1913, was a scathing review of Coffey's The Science of Logic. By contrast, in 1917, his Epistemology was favourably reviewed by T. S. Eliot.

In his 1903 article The Hexahemeron and Science, Coffey sought to find a middle ground in the conflict between natural sciences and the Catholic Church, seeing fault on both sides.

Coffey advocated for a positive view of trade unionism. Some of Coffey's ideas on labour issues, however, incurred the displeasure of his superiors at Maynooth.
