= South Salt =

South Salt An Léim Theas (Irish)
- Barony
- Interactive map of South Salt
- Sovereign state: Ireland
- County: Kildare

Area
  - Total: 67.4 km^{2} (26.0 sq mi)

South Salt (Irish: An Léim Theas) is a barony in County Kildare, Ireland.

== Etymology ==
South Salt derives its name from the Latin name of Leixlip: Saltus salmonis (literally "salmon leap"; the English name is derived from Old Norse Lax-hlaup). This makes Salt one of very few Irish placenames derived directly from Latin.

== Location ==
South Salt barony is located in northeast County Kildare, south of the Liffey, bordering on County Dublin.

== History ==
There was originally a single Salt barony, divided into south and north baronies before 1807.

== List of settlements ==
Below is a list of settlements in South Salt:

- Ardclough
- Kill
- Kilteel
