= R404 road (Ireland) =

Road in Ireland

Coordinates: 53.355471°N 6.506808°W

R404 road
- Bóthar R404

Route information
- Length: 3.1 km (1.9 mi)

Major junctions
- From: R148 Leixlip
- Passes over M4; Crosses River Liffey
- To: R402 St. Wolstans (east of Celbridge)

Location
- Country: Ireland

Highway system
- Roads in Ireland; Motorways; Primary; Secondary; Regional

The R404 road is a regional road in Ireland, located in County Kildare.
