= Leixlip Confey railway station =

Railway station in Leixlip, Ireland

Leixlip Confey Léim an Bhradáin Confaí
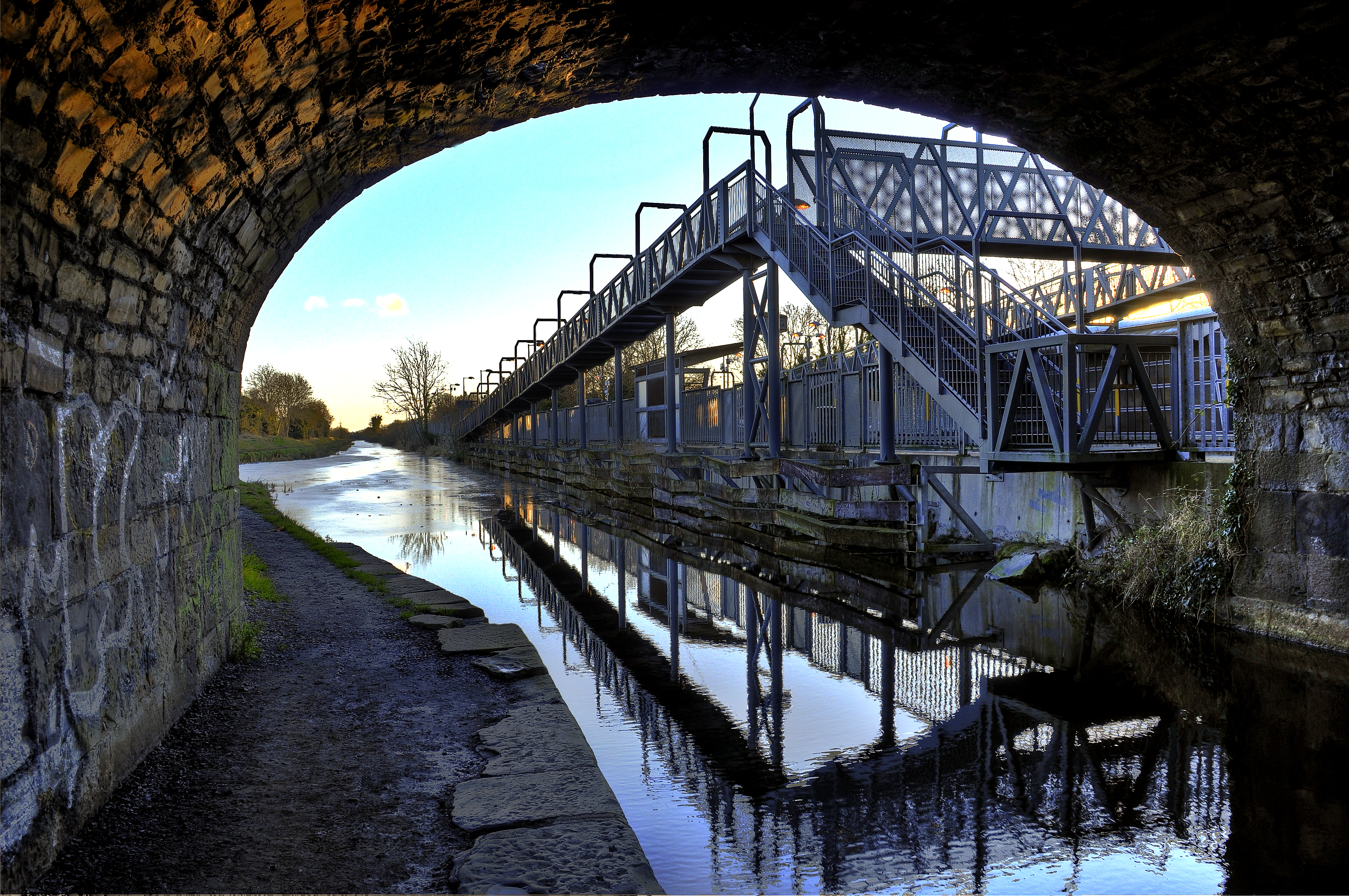

General information
- Location: Captain's Hill, Leixlip; County Kildare, W23 FV59; Ireland
- Coordinates: 53.3741°N 6.4855°W
- Owner: Iarnród Éireann
- Operator: Iarnród Éireann
- Platforms: 2

Construction
- Structure type: At-grade

Other information
- Station code: LXCON
- Fare zone: Suburban 3

History
- Opened: 2 July 1990

Key dates
- 2000: Station upgraded
Location

Leixlip Confey is a railway station in the north-eastern corner of County Kildare, Ireland. It is one of two stations that serve the civil parish of Leixlip, the other being Leixlip Louisa Bridge. Both stations lie on the Dublin to Maynooth commuter route.

== Location and access ==
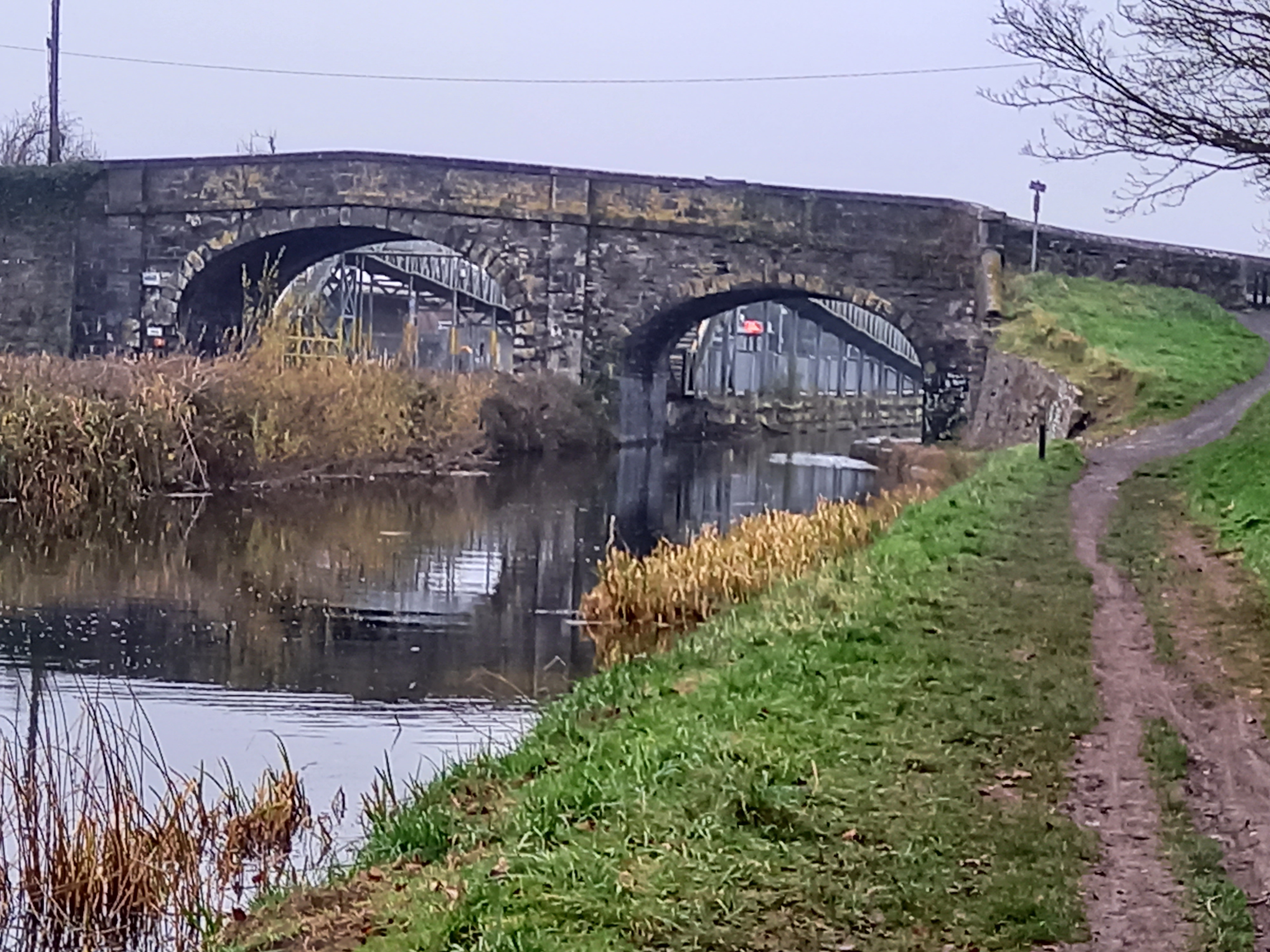
Cope Bridge at Leixlip Confey Railway Station on 29 Nov 2020

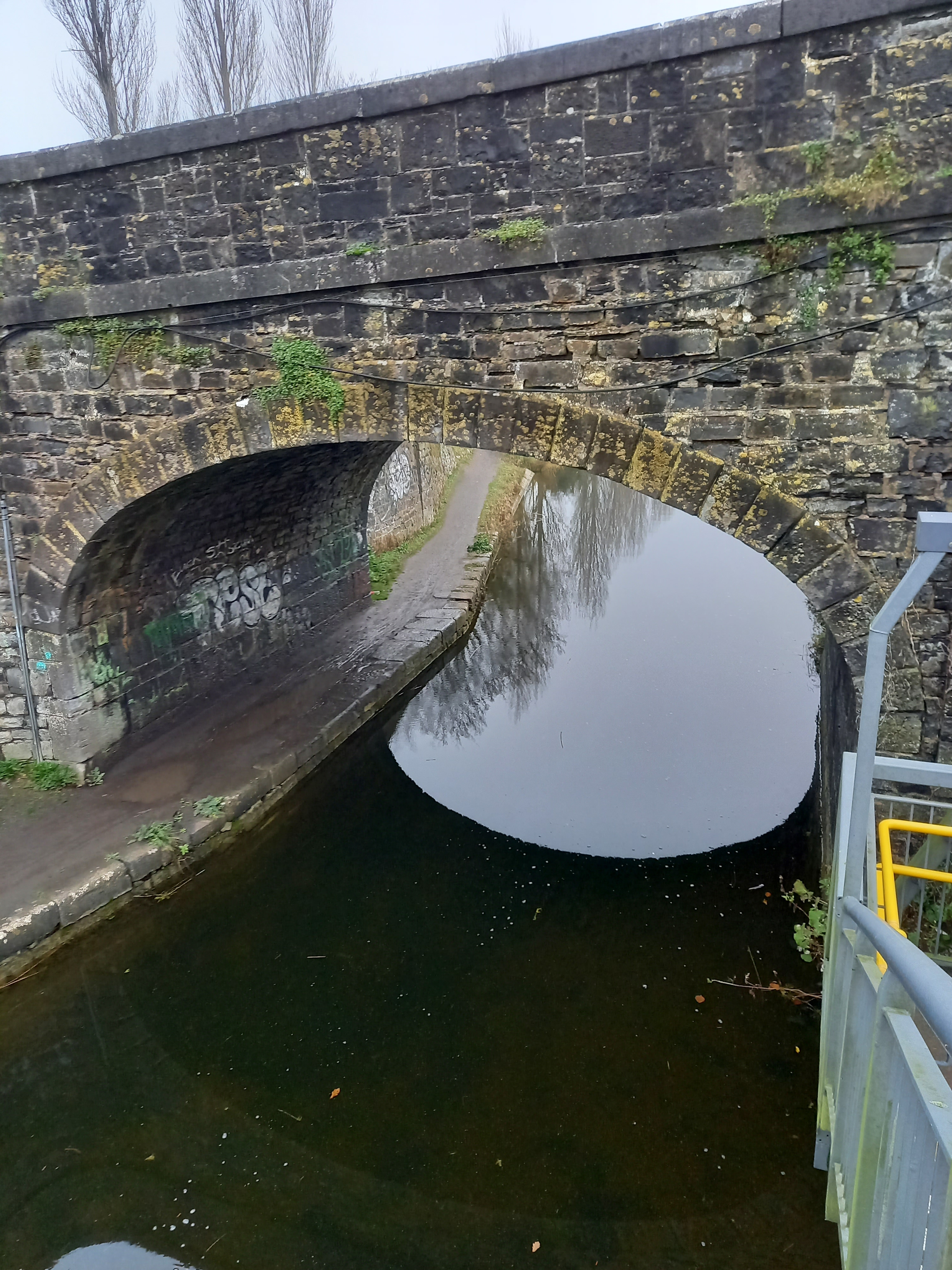
Cope Bridge, western elevation, viewed from station footbridge

The station lies at the Captain's Hill end of Leixlip, north of the town centre, and is on the R149 regional road. It is also 300m from bus stops 3993 and 3996, which are served by the C5, L54, L58, L59 and X31 routes, all operated by Dublin Bus.

== Facilities ==
The station has around 40 paid parking spaces, is wheelchair accessible and has two ticket vending machines.

== History ==
The station was opened on 2 July 1990 as a single platform halt with a portable cabin used as an office. It was upgraded in the early 2000s following a major upgrade of the Western Commuter line.

== See also ==
- List of railway stations in Ireland
- Rail transport in Ireland

Preceding station	Iarnród Éireann	Following station
Clonsilla	Commuter; Western Commuter	Leixlip Louisa; Bridge
	Future	
Clonsilla	DART; Line 1	Leixlip Louisa; Bridge
