= Coláiste Chiaráin =

Location
- Leixlip, County Kildare; Ireland
- Coordinates: 53.3639°N 6.4994°W

Information
- Motto: Tús feasa fiafraí (Irish for 'Enquiry is the beginning of knowledge')
- Established: 1980
- Principal: Mark Neville
- Gender: Mixed
- Enrolment: c. 630 (2025)
- Language: English
- Religious order: Presentation Sisters
- Website: colaistechiarain.com

Coláiste Chiaráin (in English: the College of St. Kieran), also known as Leixlip Community School, is a co-educational community school in Leixlip established in 1980 under the trusteeship of the Presentation Sisters, the Archbishop of Dublin and Co Kildare VEC. As of 2025, it had approximately 630 students enrolled. Coláiste Chiaráin's motto, in Irish, is "Tús Feasa Fiafraí" which means "enquiry is the beginning of knowledge".

== Alumni ==
- Emma Byrne (b. 1979), footballer
- David McCarthy, sprinter.
- Andrew Omobamidele, professional footballer.
