= Salt North =

North Salt An Léim Thuaidh (Irish)
- Barony
- Interactive map of North Salt
- Sovereign state: Ireland
- County: Kildare

Area
  - Total: 88.75 km^{2} (34.27 sq mi)

Salt North (Irish: An Léim Thuaidh) is a barony in County Kildare, Ireland.

== Etymology ==
Salt North derives its name from the Latin name of Leixlip: Saltus salmonis (literally "salmon leap"; the English name is derived from Old Norse Lax-hlaup). This makes Salt one of very few Irish placenames derived directly from Latin.

== Location ==
Salt North barony is located in the north-eastern corner of County Kildare, north of the River Liffey and east of the Lyreen River. It borders County Meath to the north and Fingal to the east.

== History ==
The Uí Gabla sept of the Dál Chormaic is noted early in Salt North. Ó Gelbroin is found as a chief of Mag Life on the plains of the river Liffey here. There was originally a single Salt barony, divided into north and south baronies before 1807.

== List of settlements ==
Below is a list of settlements in North Salt:

- Celbridge
- Leixlip
- Maynooth
- Straffan

Below is a list of civil parishes in North Salt:

- Leixlip (civil parish)
- Confey
- Donaghcumper
- Laraghbryan
