= Leixlip Louisa Bridge railway station =

Railway station in Leixlip, Ireland

Leixlip Louisa Bridge Léim an Bhradáin Droichead Louisa
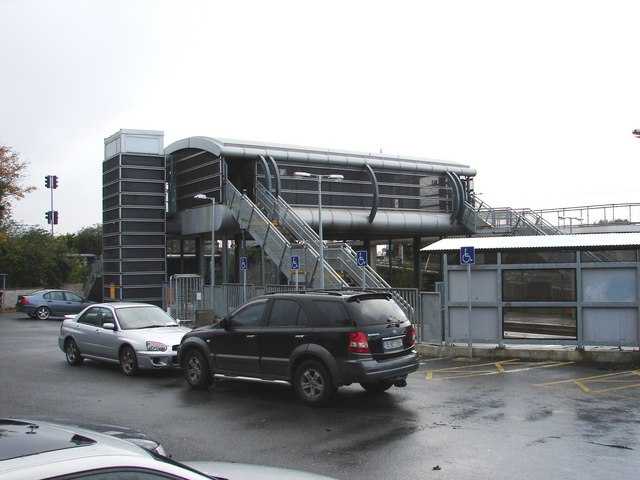

General information
- Location: Station Road, Leixlip; County Kildare, W23 NH33; Ireland
- Coordinates: 53.3699°N 6.5069°W
- Owner: Iarnród Éireann
- Operator: Iarnród Éireann
- Platforms: 2
- Tracks: 2
- Bus operators: Dublin Bus; JJ Kavanagh and Sons
- Connections: 139; C3; X26

Construction
- Structure type: At-grade

Other information
- Station code: LXLSA
- Fare zone: Suburban 3

History
- Opened: 1 September 1848

Key dates
- 1848: Station opens as Louisa Bridge and Leixlip
- 1851: Station renamed Leixlip
- 2 July 1990: Station renamed Leixlip Louisa Bridge
- 2000: Station upgraded
Location

Leixlip Louisa Bridge is a railway station in the north-eastern corner of County Kildare, Ireland. It is one of two stations that serve the civil parish of Leixlip, the other being Leixlip Confey. Both stations lie on the Dublin to Maynooth commuter route. It is one of the few stations in the Iarnród Éireann network in which the station building is located directly over the platforms, on a bridge (Dún Laoghaire railway station also follows this design).

== Location and access ==
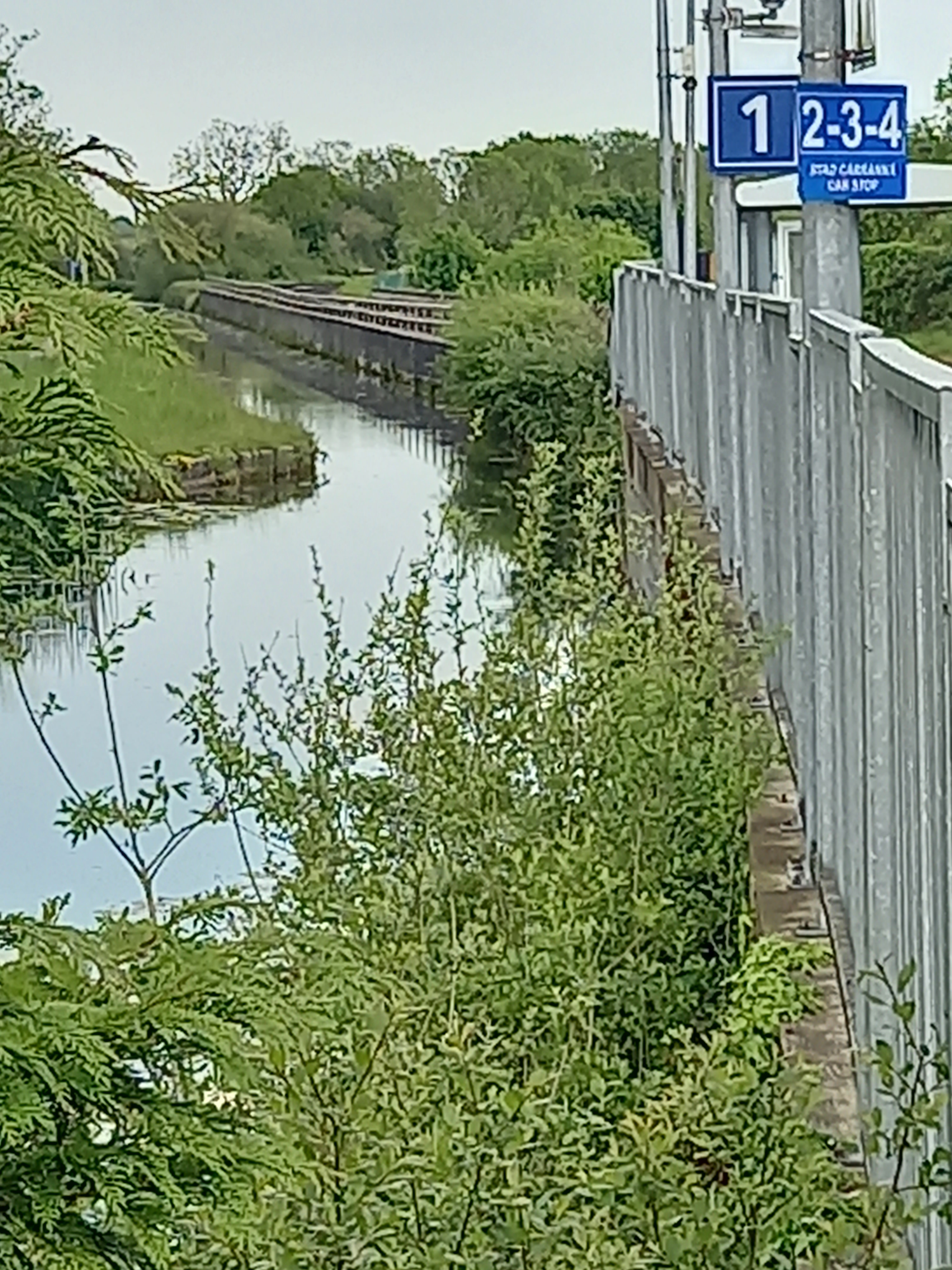
View of the Rye Water aqueduct from Louisa Bridge station

The station is located west of the town centre, on the R148 regional road.

== History ==
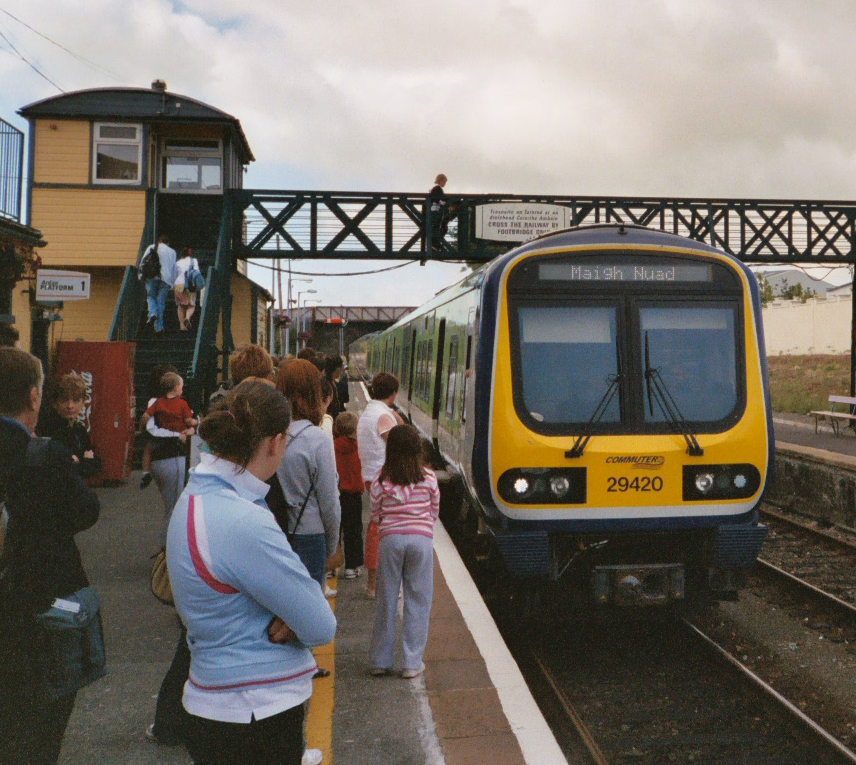
A 29000 Class DMU (29020) on a Western Commuter service to Maynooth

Originally named Louisa Bridge & Leixlip when it opened on 1 September 1848 the station was known simply as Leixlip from 1851, until the opening of Leixlip Confey railway station in 1990.

The station was upgraded to two platforms as part of the Western Commuter upgrade project in the early 2000s. At the same time, it was reconstructed to be disability-friendly. The previous station building is now a dwelling house. The 1980s concrete block station building remains, albeit out of use, and is the only remaining station building of this style from the 1980s re-opening of the Western Commuter line.

== See also ==
- List of railway stations in Ireland
- Rail transport in Ireland

Preceding station	Iarnród Éireann	Following station
Leixlip Confey	Commuter; Western Commuter	Maynooth
	Future	
Leixlip Confey	DART; Line 1	Maynooth
	Disused railways	
Lucan North; Line open, station closed	Midland Great Western Railway; Dublin-Galway/Sligo	Maynooth
