= Hill of Down =

Townland in County Meath, Ireland

Coordinates: 53°28′N 7°00′W

Hill of Down (Irish: Cnoc an Dúin) is a townland in County Meath located on the Royal Canal. Previously, there was a railway station on the line between Dublin and Galway/Sligo. There is a shop and post office at Hill of Down. The shop also has a pub and all of these are located next to the bridge over the canal (Trim to Kinnegad Road). St. Columba, St. Brigid of Kildare and St. Patrick are, according to legend, supposed to be buried within the hill, though this is probably a confusion with the Hill of Down near Downpatrick in the province of Ulster.

== Transport ==
The Midland Great Western Railway reached the area at the end of 1847. The railway station remained in use until 1963. Some of the platforms remain. The last station master was Peter Logan. Hill of Down railway station opened on 6 December 1847 and finally closed on 10 November 1947.
