= Maynooth railway station =

Railway station in Maynooth, Ireland

Maynooth Maigh Nuad
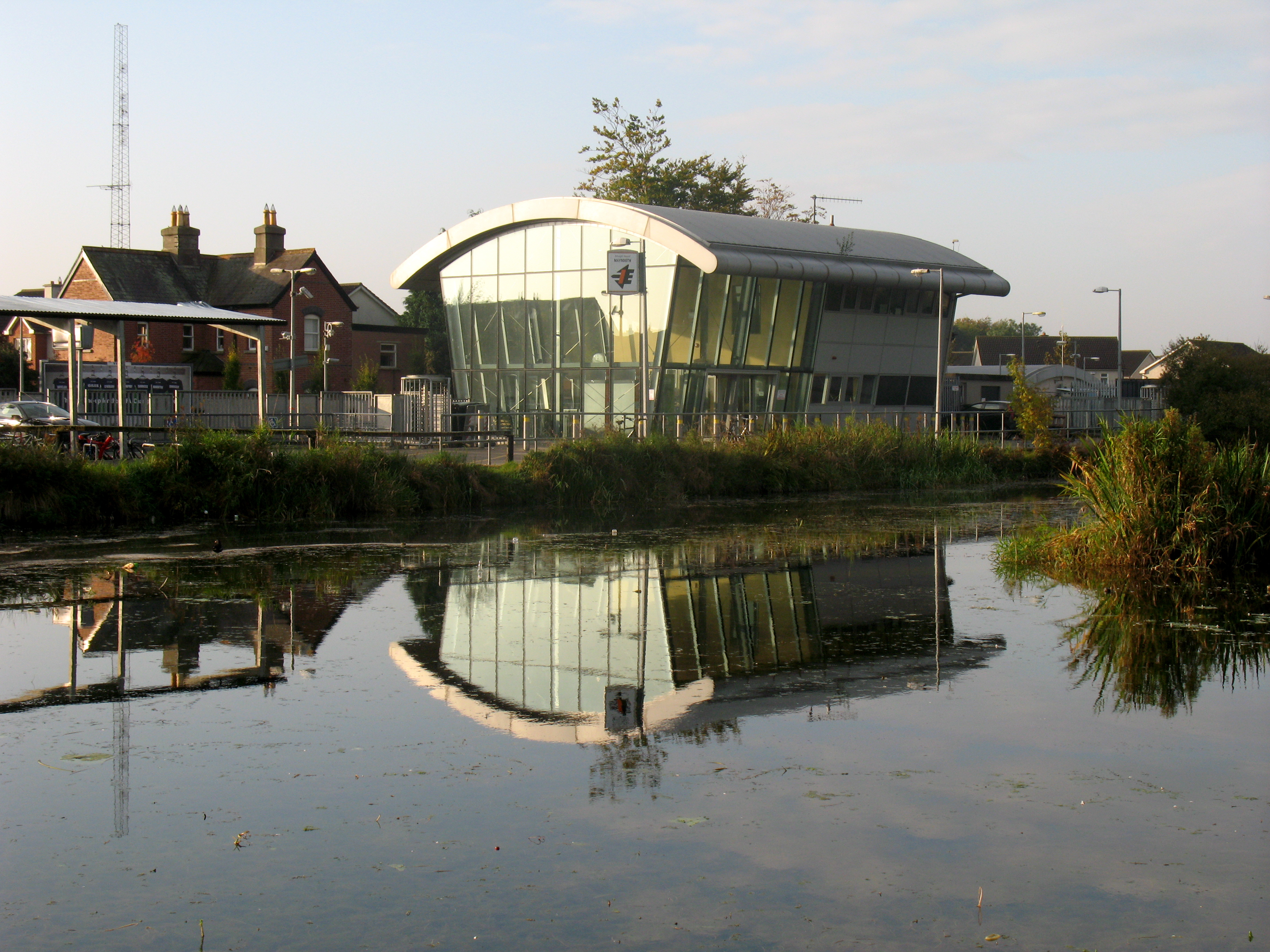
- Maynooth Station building seen from The Royal Canal

General information
- Location: Straffan Road, Maynooth; County Kildare, W23 N2F8; Ireland
- Coordinates: 53.37852°N 6.58854°W
- Owner: Iarnród Éireann
- Operator: Iarnród Éireann
- Platforms: 2
- Tracks: 2
- Bus operators: Bus Éireann; Dublin Bus; Go-Ahead Ireland; Kearns Transport
- Connections: 22; 115; 115C; C4; C6; UM02; W6; X25; X26

Construction
- Structure type: At-grade

Other information
- Station code: MYNTH
- Fare zone: Suburban 4

History
- Opened: 1 June 1848

Key dates
- 1947: Station closed for passenger services
- 1963: Station closed fully
- 30 November 1981: Station reopens
- 2000: Station upgraded
- 2012: Station refurbished
Location

Maynooth railway station serves the town of Maynooth in north County Kildare, Ireland.

It is a key exchange station on the Dublin to Maynooth commuter services, Dublin to Mullingar/Longford long-distance commuter service and Dublin to Sligo InterCity service.

== Description ==
It is situated on the south side of the Royal Canal, opposite Dukes' Harbour. Access to Maynooth is by either the footbridge to the west, which leads to the Main Street of Maynooth; west along the canal walk to residential areas of the town, or via the road bridges to the east, which lead north to the older part of Maynooth, or south to the newer areas.

The station has two staffed ticket desks and four automated ticket machines, one inside and three outside the station building. The ticket office is open from 06:00 AM to 23:15 PM, Monday to Sunday.

The footbridge crossing the tracks and connecting the two platforms was originally situated at Lansdowne Road railway station.

From Maynooth onwards to Sligo, the line is a single-track railway, the line being a double-track railway from Maynooth to Bray.

The 2018 NTA Heavy Rail Census showed 6,625 passengers using the station on the day of the survey, up from 6,228 in 2017 and 5,262 in 2016.

== Platforms ==
The station has two platforms; platform 1 on the north side of the station (where the station building is located) and platform 2 over the footbridge on the south side of the station. Platform 2 is used only a few times a day, when Commuter and InterCity services are in the station at the same time.

Preceding station	IÉ	Following station
Broombridge	InterCity (Iarnród Éireann); Dublin-Sligo railway line	Kilcock
Leixlip Louisa; Bridge	Commuter; Dublin Suburban Rail#Western Commuter	Kilcock or Terminus
	Future	
Leixlip Louisa; Bridge	DART; Line 1	Terminus

== See also ==
- List of railway stations in Ireland
- Rail transport in Ireland
