= Leixlip =

Town in County Kildare, Ireland

Leixlip Léim an Bhradáin (Irish)
- Town
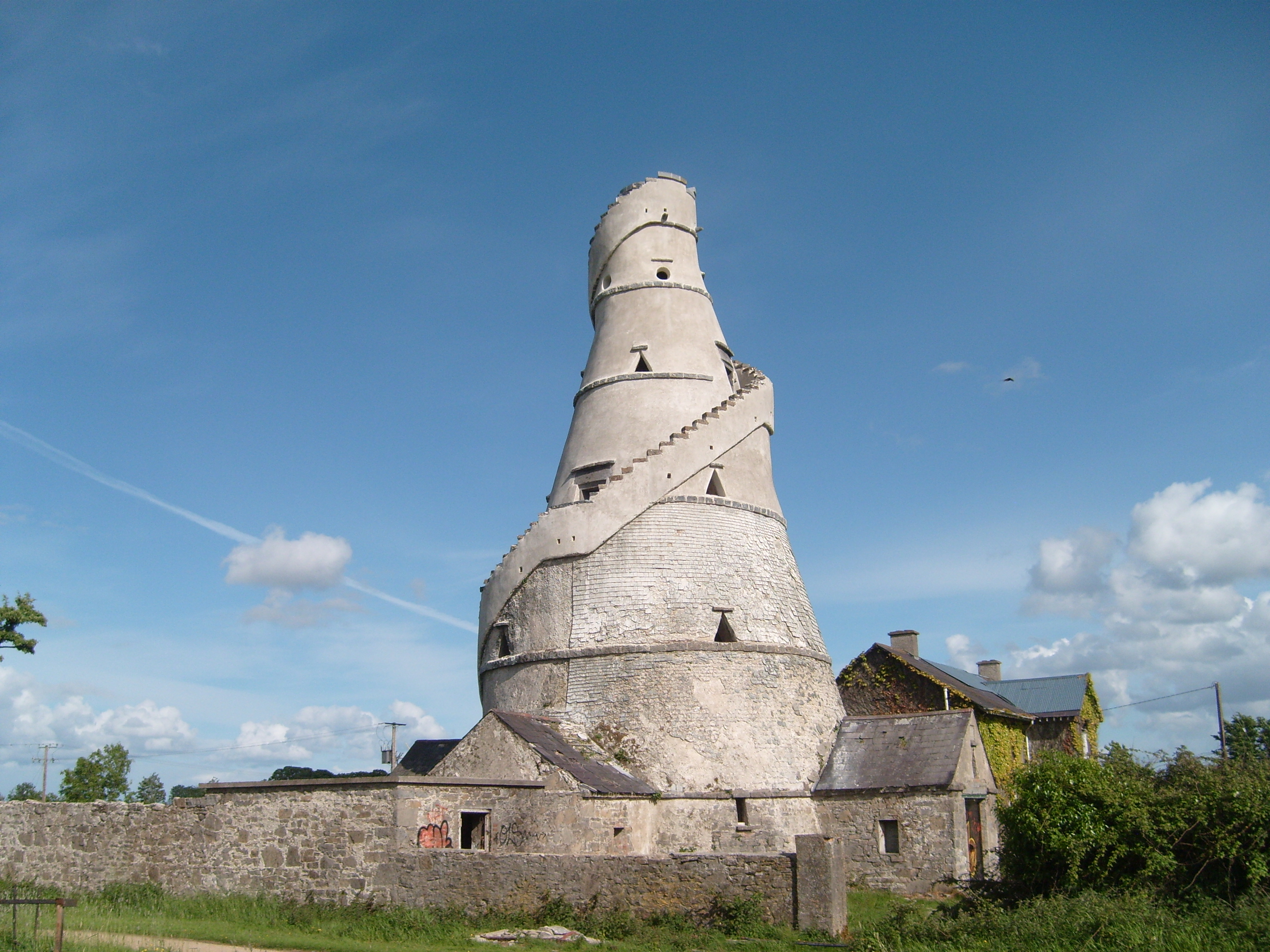
- The Wonderful Barn, Leixlip

- Coat of arms
- Motto(s): Léim ar Aghaidh "Leap Ahead"
- Location in Ireland
- Coordinates: 53.36427°N 6.48807°W
- Country: Ireland
- Province: Leinster
- County: County Kildare (primarily); County Dublin
- Local authority: Kildare County Council (primarily); South Dublin County Council
- Dáil constituency: Kildare North
- European Parliament: Midlands North-West
- Elevation: 46 m (151 ft)

Population (2022)
  - Urban: 16,733
- Demonym: Leixlipian
- Time zone: UTC±0 (WET)
  - Summer (DST): UTC+1 (IST)
- Eircode: W23
- Telephone area code: 01
- Irish Grid Reference: O003360
- Website: kildare.ie/leixlip/

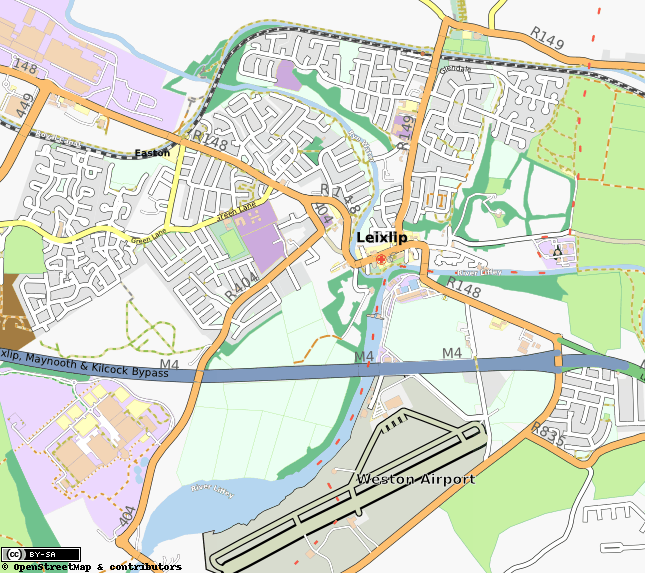
Map of Leixlip (from OpenStreetMap)

Leixlip (/ˈliːkslɪp/ or /ˈliːslɪp/; Irish: Léim an Bhradáin, [ˌl̠ʲeːmʲ ə ˈwɾˠad̪ˠaːnʲ]) is a town in north-east County Kildare, Ireland. It is situated about 16 km (10 mi) west of Dublin city centre, and parts of the town's outskirts are in County Dublin. Its location on the confluence of the River Liffey and the Rye Water has marked it as a frontier town historically: on the border between the ancient kingdoms of Leinster and Brega, as an outpost of the Pale, and on Kildare's border with County Dublin. Leixlip was also a civil parish in the ancient barony of Salt North.

As of 2022, the population of the town was 16,733. It is the fifth largest town in Kildare, and the 30th largest in Ireland.

== Name ==
The placename comes from the Old Norse lax hlaup (Younger Futhark: ᛚᛅᚼᛋ ᚼᛚᛅᚢᛒ; pronounced [laks l̥ɔup]) which means "salmon leap". The name in the Irish language (Léim an Bhradáin) is a direct translation of this, and was first adopted in the 1890s. In Latin, it is Saltus salmonis, from which comes the names of the baronies of North Salt and South Salt.

== History ==
Leixlip was a possible site of the Battle of Confey, in which the Viking King Sigtrygg Caech of Dublin defeated the Irish King of Leinster around the year 917. The first settlement at Leixlip was an outpost of Early Scandinavian Dublin, built at the furthest point where longships could be rowed up the Liffey. Its status as an outpost of Dublin continued for centuries, marking a border of the Pale.

The town was home to Arthur Guinness's first brewery in 1756, where he brewed ales until he moved on to St. James's Gate Brewery, Dublin in 1759.

The first history of the town was published in 2005.

Historical population
Year	Pop.	±%
1821	1,358	—
1831	1,149	−15.4%
1841	1,086	−5.5%
1851	832	−23.4%
1861	788	−5.3%
1871	817	+3.7%
1881	741	−9.3%
1891	679	−8.4%
1901	691	+1.8%
1911	583	−15.6%
1926	558	−4.3%
1936	571	+2.3%
1946	467	−18.2%
1951	504	+7.9%
1956	898	+78.2%
1961	915	+1.9%
1966	1,059	+15.7%
1971	2,402	+126.8%
1979	7,536	+213.7%
1981	9,306	+23.5%
1986	11,938	+28.3%
1991	13,194	+10.5%
1996	13,451	+1.9%
2002	15,143	+12.6%
2006	14,676	−3.1%
2011	15,452	+5.3%
2016	15,504	+0.3%
2022	16,773	+8.2%

== Politics ==
Leixlip is part of the Kildare North constituency, which elects four members to Dáil Éireann.

Leixlip, with Celbridge, comprises the Celbridge-Leixlip electoral area, which elects seven members to Kildare County Council. Two of those members are based in Leixlip.

Between 1988 and 2014 Leixlip had a nine-member Town Council (formerly Leixlip Town Commissioners), headed by a Cathaoirleach (chairperson). In 1990, the town's coat of arms was presented by minister Pádraig Flynn. The Local Government Reform Act 2014 abolished town councils, including Leixlip's, in 2014.

== Transport ==
=== Bus ===
Dublin Bus, and JJ Kavanagh and Sons, provide bus services. Dublin Bus run the spinal city bound C3 service, along with the non spinal city bound 52. Additionally, Leixlip is served at peak time by the X25, X31 and X32. Dublin Bus also provide the local L54, L58 and L59 bus services, which link Leixlip's housing estates together and also provide links to Celbridge and Clondalkin. JJ Kavanagh and Sons provide the regional 139 service, which links Leixlip with Naas and Blanchardstown.

=== Rail ===
Leixlip is connected to the Irish railway network on the Dublin-Sligo railway line, running from Dublin Connolly to Sligo, with two stations, Leixlip (Louisa Bridge), opened on 1 September 1848, and Leixlip (Confey), opened on 2 July 1990, located at either end of the town. While InterCity services to Sligo do not serve the town, the Maynooth/Longford Commuter services do, the frequency of the trains peaking in the mornings and evenings. Some of these services continue outbound to Mullingar and Longford. Leixlip has the distinction of being the only town in the Republic of Ireland with two operational train stations.

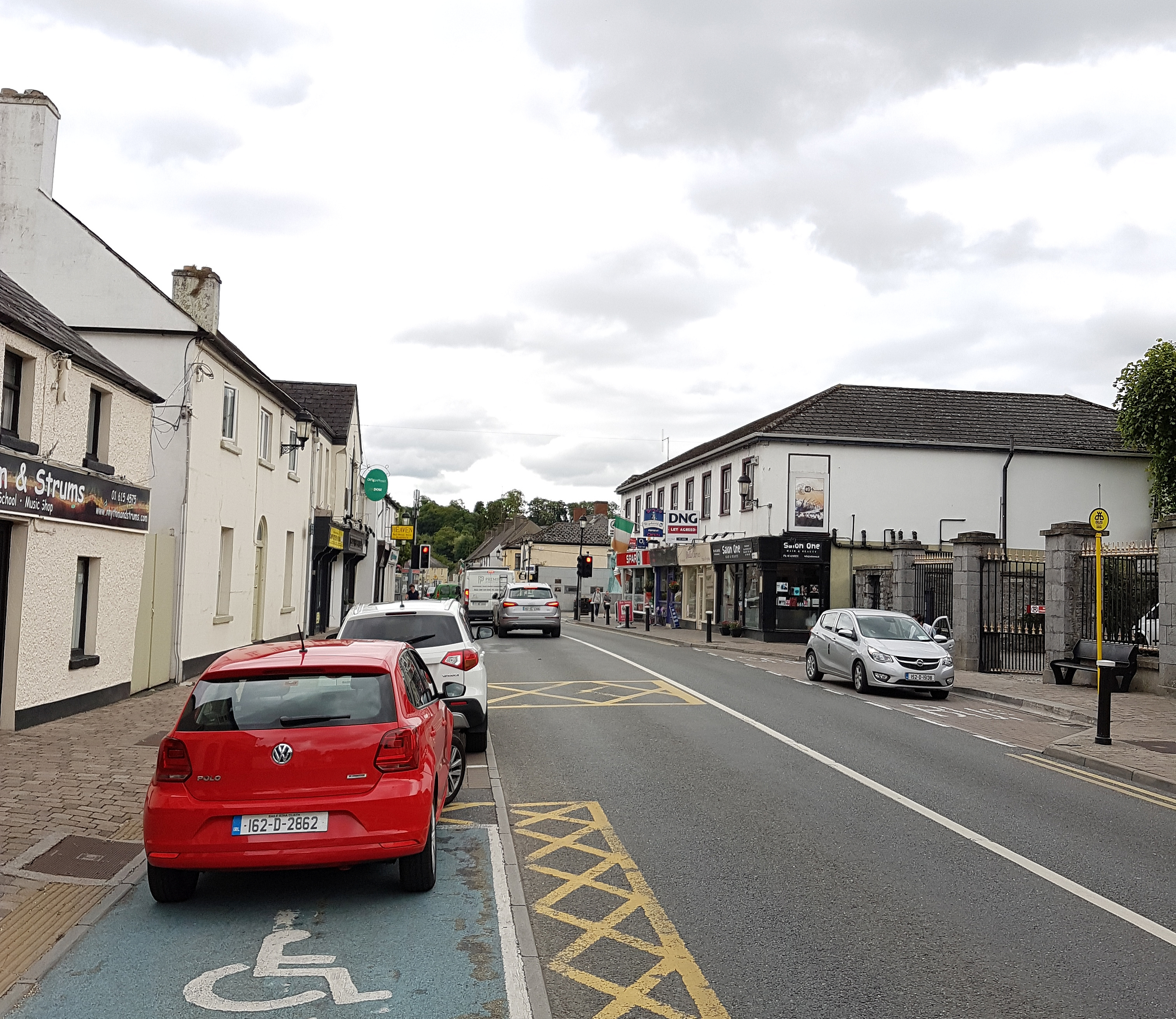
Main Street in Leixlip

=== Air ===
Weston Airport is a publicly licensed airport. Its traffic is primarily private and commercial training. Dublin Airport is 20 minutes away from Leixlip via the M50 motorway.

== Local attractions ==
=== Leixlip Castle ===
Built on a rock at the confluence of the River Liffey and the Rye Water, the central part of the castle dates from 1172, just after the Norman Invasion of 1171 and is one of the oldest continuously inhabited buildings in Ireland, pre-dating Dublin Castle by 30 years. It was used as a hunting base by King John when Lord of Ireland in 1185. It was not of major military importance but withstood a 4-day siege by the army of Edward Bruce in 1316.

Leixlip and 809 acres around it (excluding the castle) were bought by William Conolly of nearby Castletown House for approximately £12,000 in 1728. The castle was bought by Conolly's nephew and heir, William James Conolly, in 1731. His family sold it in 1914. Various famous tenants of the Conollys in the castle included Archbishop Stone, the Protestant Primate (1750s), the Viceroy Lord Townshend (1770s), Lord Waterpark, and Baron de Robeck (who drowned at the Salmon Leap). In the 1920s it was the residence of the first French ambassador to the Irish Free State. In 1945 the castle was sold to William Kavanagh, prior to the purchase in 1958 by The Hon. Desmond Guinness. The castle features in the 1825 Gothic short story Leixlip Castle by Charles Maturin.

=== Castletown House & The Wonderful Barn ===
Located off the main street of nearby Celbridge, Castletown House is the first grand Palladian House in Ireland – the design of the building led to the construction of Leinster House and from thence to the White House in Washington, D.C. Begun in 1722 for Speaker William Conolly (1662–1729), Speaker of the Irish House of Commons, the lands and the house itself lie in Celbridge, however, there is also an entrance from Leixlip, hence there are two modern housing estates bearing the Castletown name, one in each town. To mark the eastern vista of Castletown a conical-shaped building – The Wonderful Barn – was constructed in 1743 with the stairs ascending around the exterior of the building.

=== St. Catherine's Priory ===
St. Catherine's Priory was acquired by judge Nicholas White.

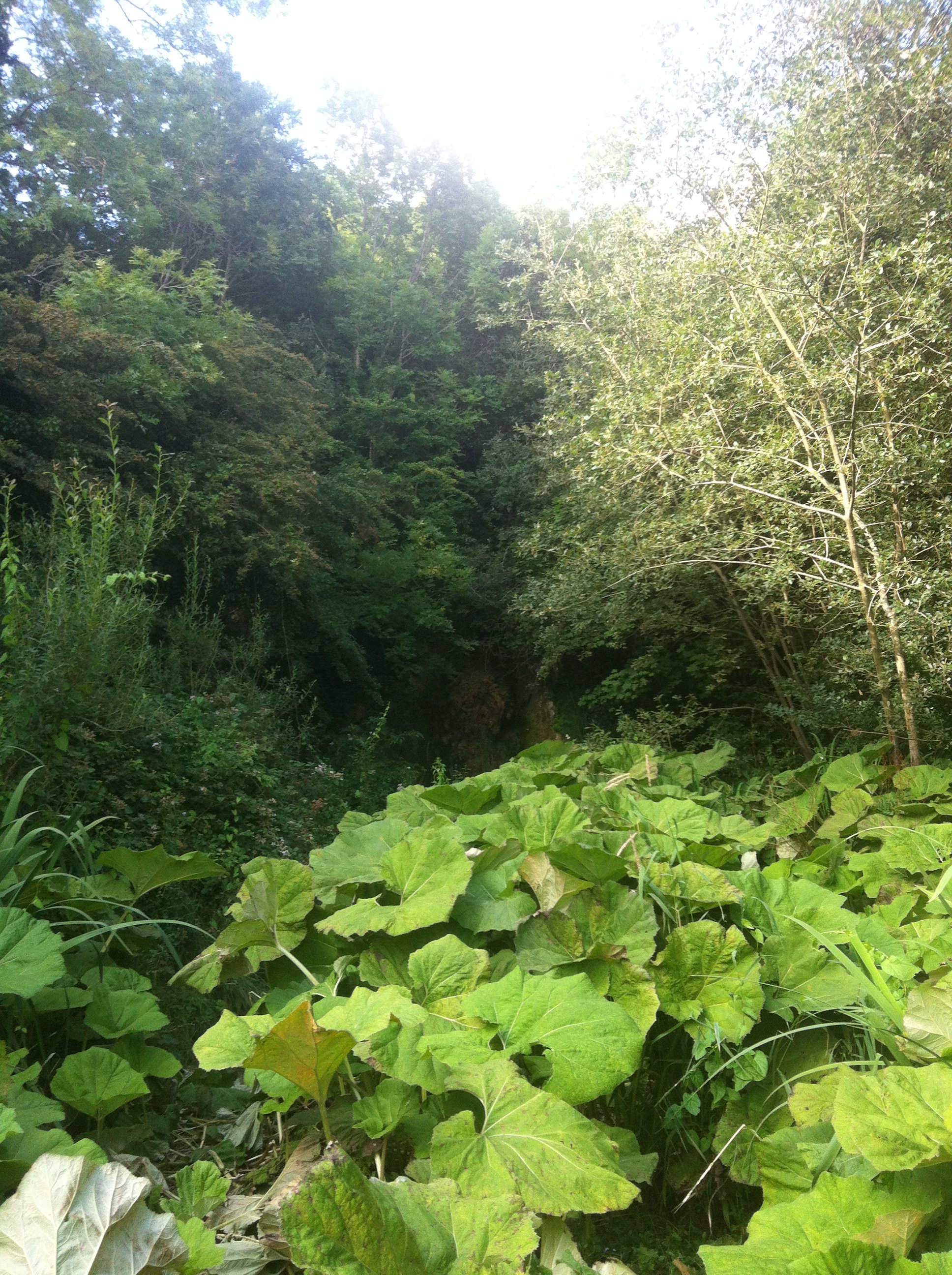
Waterfall in Leixlip Spa

=== Confey Castle ===
British publisher and cartographer Samuel Lewis mentions Confey Castle in the first volume of his 1837 work A Topographical Dictionary of Ireland. In it, he comments that Confey's (or Confoy as he spells it) population was 165, had formerly had a town and a castle of some importance, which were noticed by Camden. Of the tower's remains were a massive five-storey structure with turrets at the north and west angles; that at the north angle containing a winding staircase opening through pointed arches into each storey. The principal entrance was under a semicircular archway. In the war of 1688 the castle is said to have been strongly garrisoned, and to have sustained an attack.

=== Leixlip Spa ===
Leixlip Spa was found in 1793 by workmen working on the construction of the Royal Canal, which runs through Leixlip.

=== Salmon Leap ===
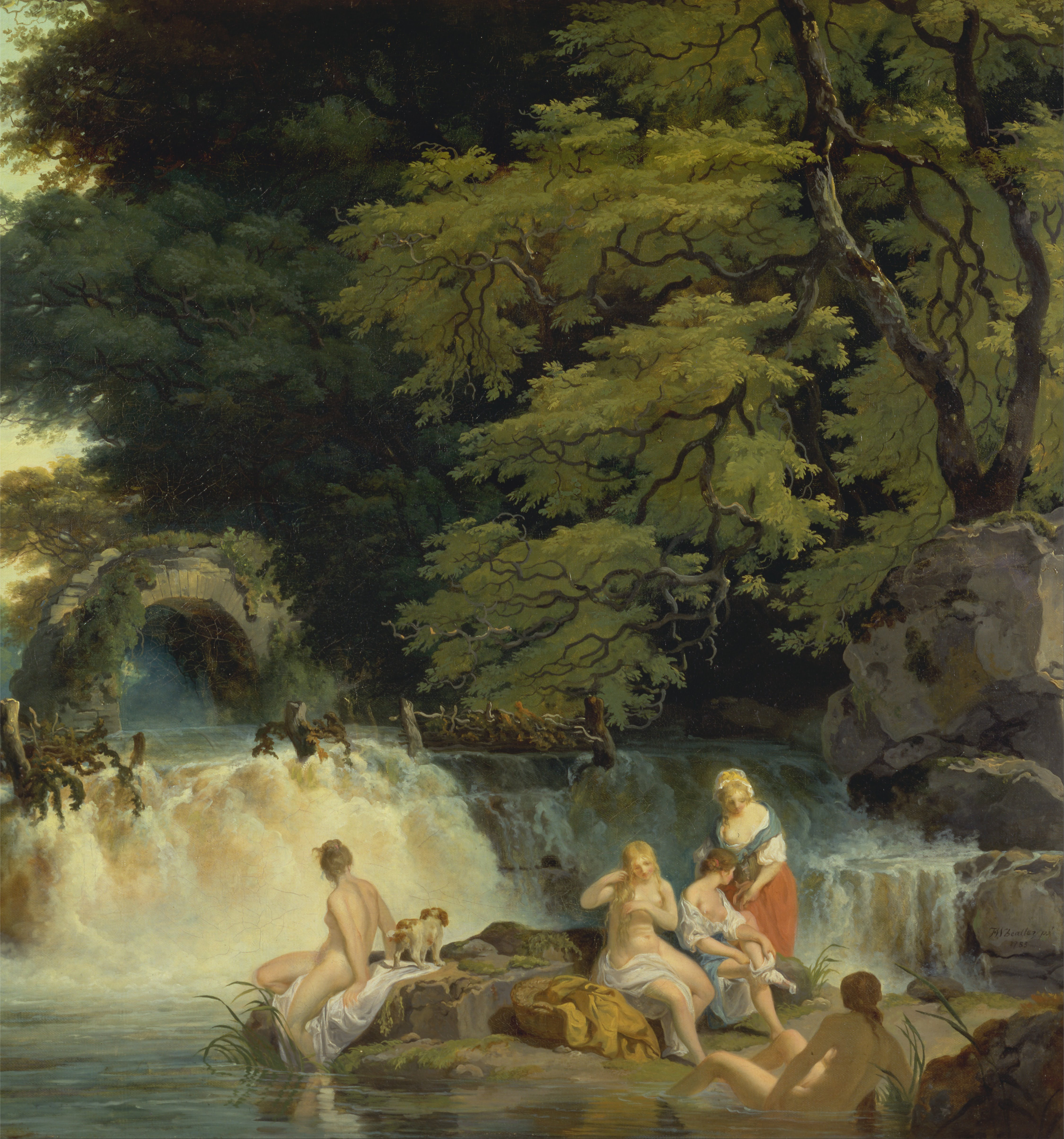
The Salmon Leap, Leixlip by Francis Wheatley, 1783

Salmon Leap is a 5-metre waterfall on the Liffey just upstream from the village. A hydroelectric dam was completed in 1945, and its lake flooded the waterfall. The dam generates 4 Megawatts.

== Religion ==
Leixlip is divided into two Catholic parishes, Leixlip (Our Lady's Nativity) and Confey (St. Charles Borromeo), each with its own parish church. The Church of Ireland parish of St Mary's also has a church in Leixlip, located in Main Street. This medieval church was restyled in the 1750s with Gothic windows, and its belltower clock dates from 1720. People from Our Lady's Nativity parish also have their own identity separate from people in the Confey parish. The Confey parish members are known as 'Hillers' and people from the Our Lady's Nativity parish are known as 'Farenders'.

== Education and library ==
As with religion and sports, education in Leixlip is divided by the two Catholic parishes of Leixlip (Our Lady's Nativity) and Confey (St. Charles Borromeo).

The respective schools in the Confey district are Confey Community College (a community school), Scoil San Carlo (Junior), and Scoil San Carlo Senior School (both national schools). The community school of Confey College has approximately 750 pupils in total, and similarly to Coláiste Chiaráin is mixed gender and non-denominational. The name "San Carlo", while used as the Irish names of the national schools in the St Charles Borromeo parish, is actually the Italian rather than actual Irish translation (which would be "Naomh Cathal").

Leixlip also has one of the few Primary Montessori Schools in Ireland, Weston Primary Montessori School. Established in 2016 by the parents and teachers of the former Glebe School, this school provides Montessori education to children from 3–12 years and is located on the grounds of Barnhall Rugby Club.

A public library opened in Leixlip in May 2006. It is situated in Confey, near both Scoil San Carlo and Confey Train Station. Leixlip Library hosts a variety of events and activities as well as free Internet access to library members.

== Festival ==
The Leixlip Festival (previously known as the Salmon Festival) has taken place every year since 1990 on the June bank holiday weekend. It offers live entertainment in pubs, a number of open-air concerts, street carnival and fireworks display.

Leixlip Salmon Festival Limited also provides a youth training scheme in association with FÁS.

The festival has played host to bands such as Aslan in 2011, The Blizzards in 2017, Delorentos in 2015, and The Riptide Movement in 2011, 2015 and 2019.

== Industry ==
Local Leixlip employers include Intel, who own a fabrication plant in the town. Hewlett Packard Enterprise was also a local employer, from 1995 until the closure of the facility in 2017.

== Notable people ==
- Lily Allen, English recording artist, actress and fashion designer lived in Leixlip as a child and attended school there.
- Trevor Brennan, Irish international rugby player
- Emma Byrne, Republic of Ireland women's national football team and Arsenal goalkeeper
- Jake Carroll, professional footballer, attended secondary school at Confey College in Leixlip.
- Nathan Collins, Premier League and Republic of Ireland professional footballer
- Thomas Conolly, MP of both the British House of Commons (1759–1780) and the Irish House of Commons (1761–1800), was born in Leixlip
- David Geraghty, musician and member of Bell X1
- Matt Goff, soldier during the Irish War of Independence and full-back for Kildare in six All-Ireland finals
- Steven Gray, former professional footballer in the League of Ireland and in Australia.
- Arthur Guinness, co-owner with his brother Richard of the brewery business in Leixlip. Richard lived on the town's Main Street, and was the landlord of the Salmon Leap Inn.
- Roy Keane, former Manchester United and Republic of Ireland captain lived in the Riverforest housing estate in Leixlip aged 18.
- Senan Kelly, professional boxer
- Ana Kriégel, schoolgirl murdered in May 2018; the murderers were the youngest people convicted of murder in Ireland.
- John Martin, former League of Ireland footballer, coach and Director of the Football Association of Ireland
- David Matthews, athlete and holder of the Irish 800 metres record
- Catherine Murphy, politician, member of Dáil Éireann and co-leader/co-founder of the Social Democrats
- Enda Murphy, former Kildare Gaelic football captain, and has represented Ireland in the International Rules Series
- Gerard Nash, former professional footballer with Ipswich Town and coach/manager of several sides in England, Sweden and Ireland.
- Clíona Ní Chiosáin, actress, television presenter, and teacher, known as the star of TG4's Aifric who attended Scoil Chearbhaill Uí Dhálaigh (primary school).
- Andrew Omobamidele, Premier League and Republic of Ireland professional footballer, grew up in Leixlip and played for Leixlip United originally.
- Jack O'Shea, Kerry Gaelic footballer, lives in the town and played for Leixlip GAA
- Arthur Price, Archbishop of Cashel, and benefactor of Guinness is buried beneath the aisle of St Mary's Church, Leixlip
- Eoin Rheinisch, three time Olympian slalom canoeist
- Olamide Shodipo, professional footballer
- Eoghan Stokes, professional footballer
- David McCarthy, Irish sprinter and 4 × 400 metres relay medalist at the 2004 IAAF World Indoor Championships
- Jean Sophia Pigott, Irish poet and hymn lyricist

== Sports ==
=== Athletics ===
Le Chéile Athletic Club was founded in 2003, and trains at their facility at the Leixlip Amenities Centre.

=== Canoeing ===
Salmon Leap Canoe Club, founded in 1961, is located on the banks of Leixlip Lake. The club won the Ribadesella trophy in 2017.

=== Gaelic games ===
Leixlip has two Gaelic Athletic Association clubs: Leixlip GAA, founded in 1887, and Confey GAA, founded in 1989.

=== Soccer ===
There are three amateur football clubs: Confey F.C., St. Catherine's Park; Leixlip United F.C., Leixlip Amenities Centre; Liffeybank F.C., St. Catherine's Park. Confey F.C. play in the Leinster Senior League (men) and the Amateur League (over 35's). Leixlip United F.C. participate in Leinster Senior League (men), Amateur League (over 35's), Leinster Football League (men Under 20), Dublin & District Schoolboys/girls League (boys & girls), Eastern Women's Football League (women), Metropolitan Girls League (girls). Liffeybank F.C. (called Leixlip Town 1995–2017) participate in the Athletic Union League (men), Eastern Women's Football League (women), Metropolitan Girls League (girls) and the North Dublin Football League (boys).

=== Rugby ===
Barnhall Rugby Football Club, a rugby union club, which competes in the All-Ireland League, is located on the outskirts of the town in Parsonstown.

=== Basketball ===
Liffey Celtics Basketball Club is a local basketball club. The club's underage basketball teams compete in the Dublin Area Board League and Cup competitions. Training and home matches take place at the Leixlip Amenities Centre, Confey GAA hall, and Colaiste Cois Life (Lucan). The club also has a senior women's team competing in the Basketball Ireland Superleague and has won two National Cups, in 2019 and 2025.

=== Other sports ===
Leixlip has been host to coarse fishing competitions, using a permanently pegged stretch of the Royal Canal. The Leixlip stretch consists of 62 marked pegs and there is also the Confey stretch consisting of sixty pegs. The Leixlip stretch of the Rye River is controlled by the Leixlip and District Angling Association.

There are golfing facilities at Elm Hall Golf Club on the Loughlinstown Road and two 18 hole pitch and putt courses in the area.

== International relations ==
=== Twin towns – Sister cities ===
Leixlip is twinned with the following towns:

- Bressuire, France
- Niles, Illinois, United States

== See also ==
- List of abbeys and priories in Ireland (County Kildare)
- List of towns and villages in Ireland
- Leixlip Louisa Bridge railway station
- Leixlip Confey railway station
- Guinness family
- Liffey Champion, local newspaper
