= Killucan and Rathwire =

Town in County Westmeath, Ireland

Killucan Irish: Cill Liúcainne
- Census town
- Location in Ireland
- Coordinates: 53°30′18″N 7°08′49″W
- Country: Ireland
- Province: Leinster
- County: County Westmeath
- Elevation: 128 m (420 ft)

Population (2016)
  - Total: 1,370
- Time zone: UTC+0 (WET)
  - Summer (DST): UTC-1 (IST (WEST))
- Irish Grid Reference: N566514

Map of Killucan and Rathwire

The villages of Killucan (Irish: Cill Liúcainne, meaning 'church of Lucan') and Rathwire (Irish: Ráth Guaire, meaning 'fort of Guaire') are co-located in the east of County Westmeath, Ireland. As of the 2016 census, they had a combined population of 1,370. Killucan is on the R156 road about 15 km (9.3 mi) from Mullingar and 60 km (37 mi) from Dublin.

== History ==
=== History of Rathwire ===
Both Killucan and Rathwire have ancient origins, as indicated by the ancient ringfort (rath) in Rathwire. According to legend, the fort was built by the Chieftain Guaire who gave Rathwire its name. The ruins of the hillfort remain on the western end of the village. Legend has it that Guaire is buried in the ruins and guarded by a savage dog. Subsequently, the Norman Lord Hugh de Lacy built his Motte alongside the remains of Guaire's Fort. In 1210, King John came to Rathwire to subdue the De Lacys when he fought and won the Battle of Killucan. While here, he also received the Gaelic King of Connacht, Cathal Crobderg O'Connor, who travelled to make his submission. In the 15th and 16th centuries, Rathwire belonged to the Darcy family of Platten. Their castle of Rathwire was burnt during the rebellion of Silken Thomas.

=== History of Killucan ===
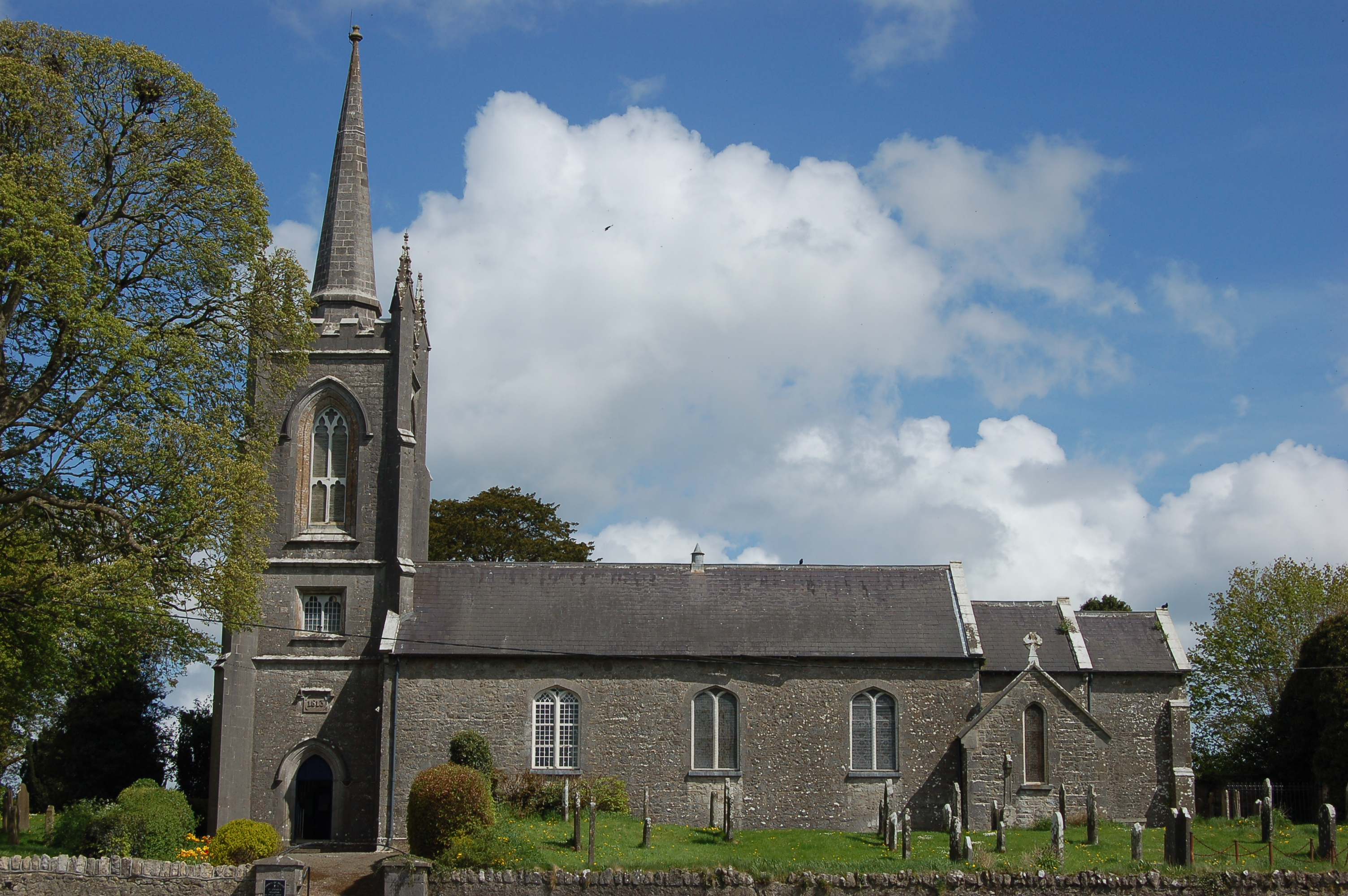
St Etchen's Church Killucan

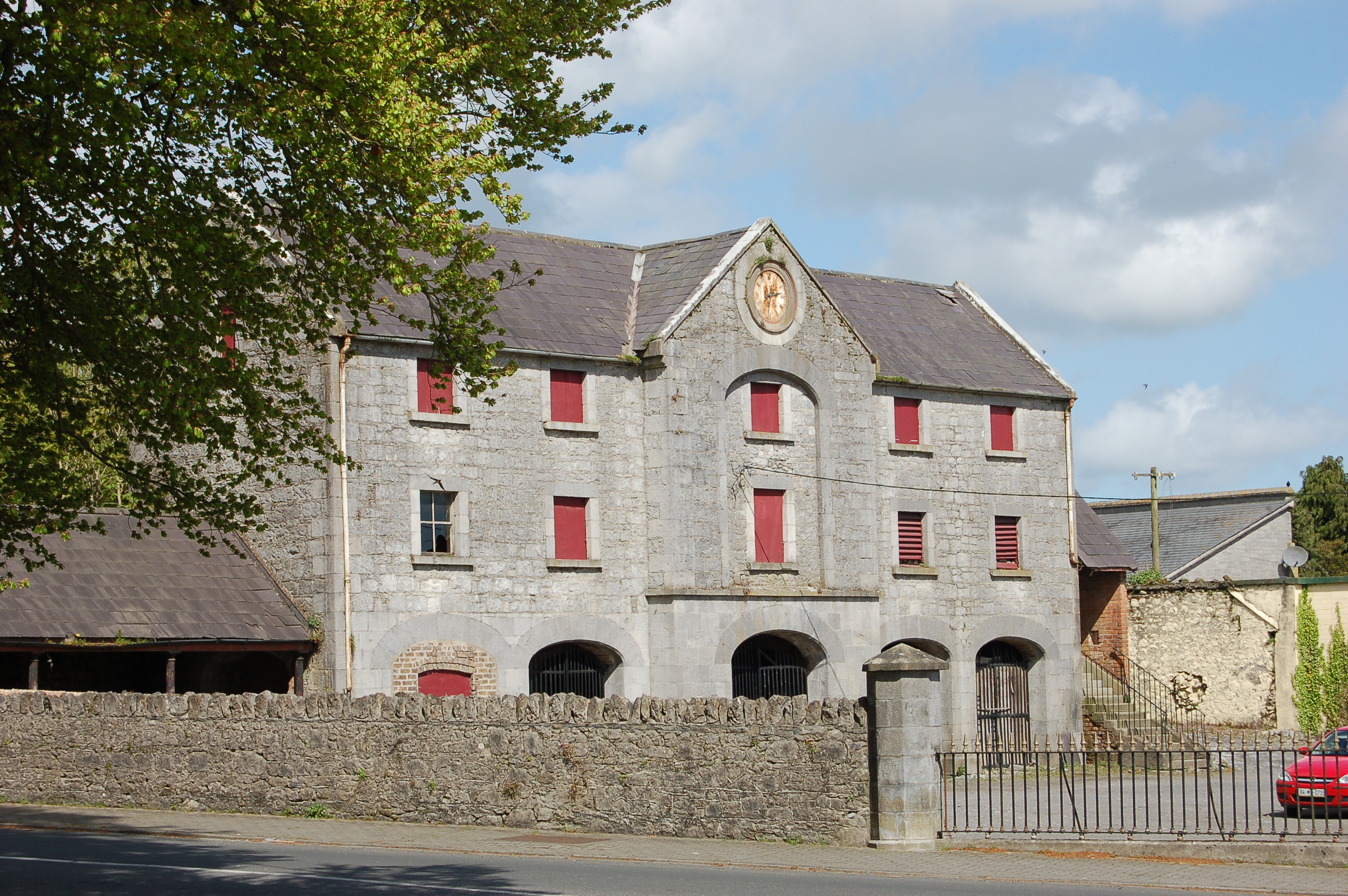
Market House Killucan

The origins of the name Killucan are uncertain but it probably comes from the Irish Cill Lucaine (Church of Lucan). Lucan was a 6th-century abbot who is believed to have founded a church in the area. The church, however, did not survive to the Middle Ages and no trace of it remains. Other sources suggest that Lucaine is, however, a corruption of Etchén, who was bishop of the nearby Clonfad monastery. Whichever version is correct, the present-day church in Killucan is St. Etchén's. There has been a church on this site since the time of the Normans (the De Lacys). The present church on the site dates from 1802. Inside this church is a 13th-century chalice. On the east end of the site are the remains of a 15th-century medieval tomb. Although the site was initially used as a Catholic Church, it was changed to a Protestant (Anglican) one during the Cromwellian Plantation.

After the Penal Laws persecuting Catholics were reformed in the 19th century, a new Catholic church, St Joseph's, was built in Rathwire. St. Joseph's Church was built in the neo-Gothic style at the end of the 1830s, being completed around 1840. It was constructed under the orders of the then parish priest, Fr. Eugene O'Rourke. An Italianate belfry was added almost thirty years later, in the late 1860s.

A private helicopter crash in the area, in July 2024, resulted in the deaths of two men.

== Killucan parish ==
The parish of Killucan includes both Killucan and Rathwire as well as the countryside around them. The village of Raharney, about 4 km (2.5 mi) to the east of Killucan village, is also part of Killucan parish. St. Joseph's Church is in Rathwire while St. Mary's is in Raharney. The parish priest's house (parochial house) is in Rathwire.

== Economy ==
The majority of people living in Killucan and Rathwire commute to work elsewhere. Economic prosperity has historically been linked with transport connections to places like Dublin, and the Royal Canal and the Sligo-Dublin railway line previously served the area. Sports facilities serving the area include a free golf course and fishing lake, a library and other amenities.

== Schools ==
There are three primary schools (national schools) in the parish, including St. Patrick's NS in Killucan, St. Joseph's NS in Rathwire, and St. Mary's NS in Raharney.

There is a secondary school, Columba College, located in Killucan.

== Transport ==
=== Royal Canal ===
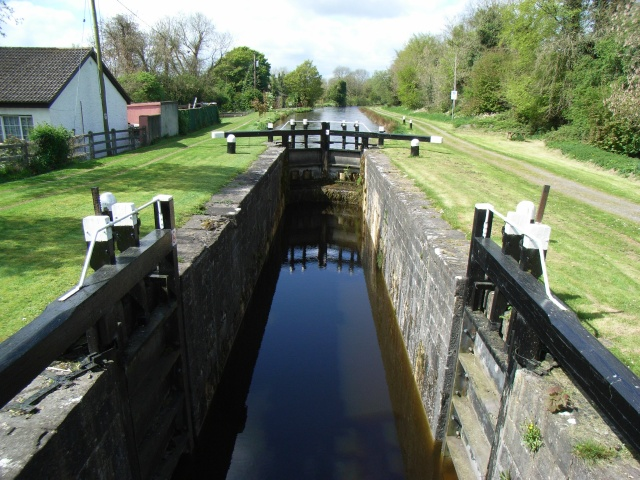
Royal Canal Lock No.22 at Killucan

The twin villages reached the height of their prosperity during the 19th century due to the arrival of first the Royal Canal and later the Midland Great Western Railway. The canal was built between 1790 and 1817. It grew in the importance of transporting people and goods until the mid-19th century. After this, the advent of rail and road travel in Ireland led to its slow decline and it formally closed in 1961. It was abandoned and became unusable for many years. The Royal Canal Greenway, a 130 km greenway along the canal, was launched in 2021 following the reopening of the canal to navigation in 2010. The canal is used for fishing, walks, boating and canoeing in the Killucan area. The Harbour at Thomastown (1 kilometre South of Killucan) was expanded to cater for the growing number of tourists who rent barges from there. The canal through Killucan passes through the Killucan Flight, a stretch of eight locks over 2 km (1.2 mi). East of the flight there are no further locks for 27 km (17 mi) while there are no further locks to the west until past Mullingar, the highest point on the canal.

=== Railway ===
The Midland Great Western Railway reached the town in 1848 when their railway line was extended from Hill of Down to Mullingar. The station, known as Killucan railway station and located at Riverstown, closed in 1963. The signal cabin remained open until 2005 when automated signalling was introduced.

A local campaign, described in 2022 as "ongoing for more than 20 years", has proposed that the train station be reopened. Denis Leonard, of the Killucan Kinnegad Transport Lobby Group, stated in 2019 that "a feasibility study has to be conducted, funding secured for work on the station and planning permission sought".

=== Public transport ===
Bus Éireann route 115A provides a commuter service from Killucan to Dublin via Ballivor, Summerhill, Kilcock and Maynooth and vice versa Mondays to Fridays inclusive. The route 118 service to/from Mullingar, which additionally served Rathwire was discontinued after operation on 24 August 2013.

== Sport ==
The local Gaelic Athletic Association (GAA) club, Killucan GAA, fields Gaelic football teams at senior club level. They won the Westmeath Intermediate Football Championship in 2005. Remained at senior level since, the club reached the county semi-final in 2006. Killucan lost to eventual champions Tyrrellspass in 2010.

== Notable people ==
- The Academic, music group

== See also ==
- List of towns and villages in Ireland
- Market Houses in Ireland
