= Westmeath Way =

Hiking trail in County Westmeath, Ireland

- Length: 100 kilometres (62 miles)
- Location: County Westmeath, Ireland
- Designation: National Waymarked Trail
- Trailheads: Kilbeggan, Garrycastle (Athlone)
- Use: Hiking
- Difficulty: Easy
- Season: Any

The Westmeath Way (Irish: Slí na hIarmhí) is a long-distance trail in County Westmeath, Ireland. It is 100 kilometres (62 miles) long and begins in Kilbeggan and ends in Athlone. It is typically completed in two days. It is designated as a National Waymarked Trail by the National Trails Office of the Irish Sports Council and is managed by Westmeath County Council and the Westmeath Way Committee. The trail forms part of the Dublin-Galway Greenway, part of the route 2 of the EuroVelo European cycle network.

Map of the EuroVelo 2 route.

Starting at Kilbeggan, the trail follows the River Brosna for approximately 7 kilometres (4.3 miles) and the crosses countryside to the village of Ballinagore. From Ballinagore, the route travels on to reach the shores of Lough Ennell at the townland of Lilliput, from which Jonathan Swift used the name in Gulliver's Travels. The trails follow tracks and roads around the lough, via Dysart village, before reaching Bellmount Bridge where it follows the Royal Canal to Mullingar with a rail-trail over the disused Mullingar-Athlone rail line to Athlone.

A review of the National Waymarked Trails in 2010 found usage of the trail to be low and recommended that the amount of walking on tarred roads (41%) be reduced, that a series of looped walks off the main trail be developed and the trail should be promoted to day walkers.

== See also ==
- EuroVelo
