= Royal Canal Greenway =

Greenway in Ireland

Coordinates: 53.378261°N 6.590205°W

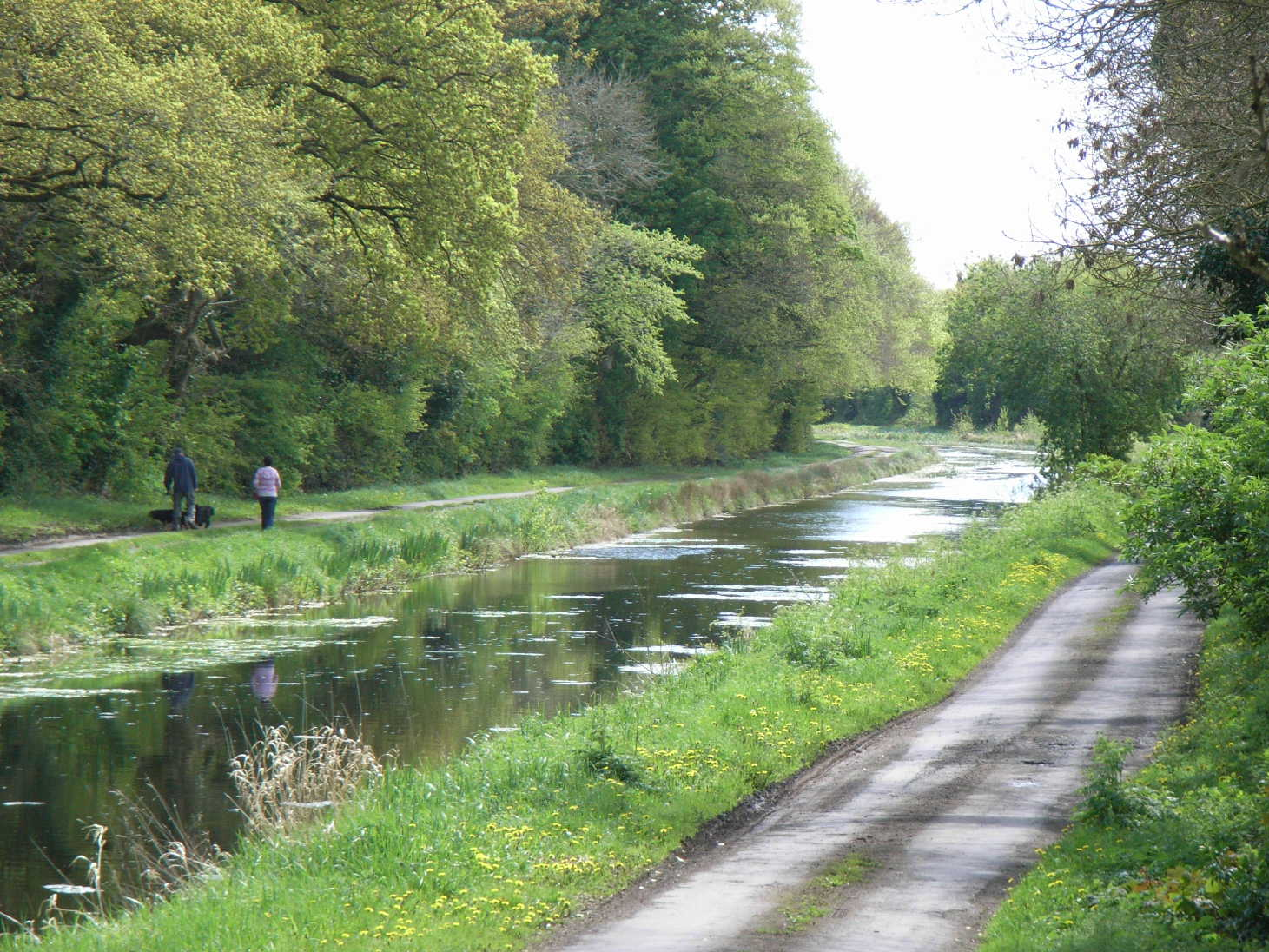
- Royal Canal east of D'Arcy's bridge, County Westmeath
- Length: 130km
- Location: Maynooth-Longford and Cloondara, Ireland
- Trailheads: Maynooth, County Kildare; Longford town Cloondara, County Longford
- Use: Hiking, Cycling

Map of the EuroVelo 2 route.

The Royal Canal Greenway is a greenway, in Ireland, which will become part of the western section of EuroVelo 2, and the Dublin-Galway Greenway. Since its official opening in March 2021, it is the longest greenway in Ireland. It spans from Maynooth County Kildare to Longford and Cloondara, County Longford passing through counties Meath and Westmeath.

== Sections ==
The greenway uses the routes of former towpaths of the Royal Canal.

The route makes up most of the older Royal Canal Way which links Ashtown, Dublin to Longford and Cloondara along the Royal Canal.

The official "starting" point for the Greenway is at Maynooth harbour, 28 km from the Eastern end of the Greenway; but works are either in planning, under construction or completed along the entire length of the Royal Canal Way.

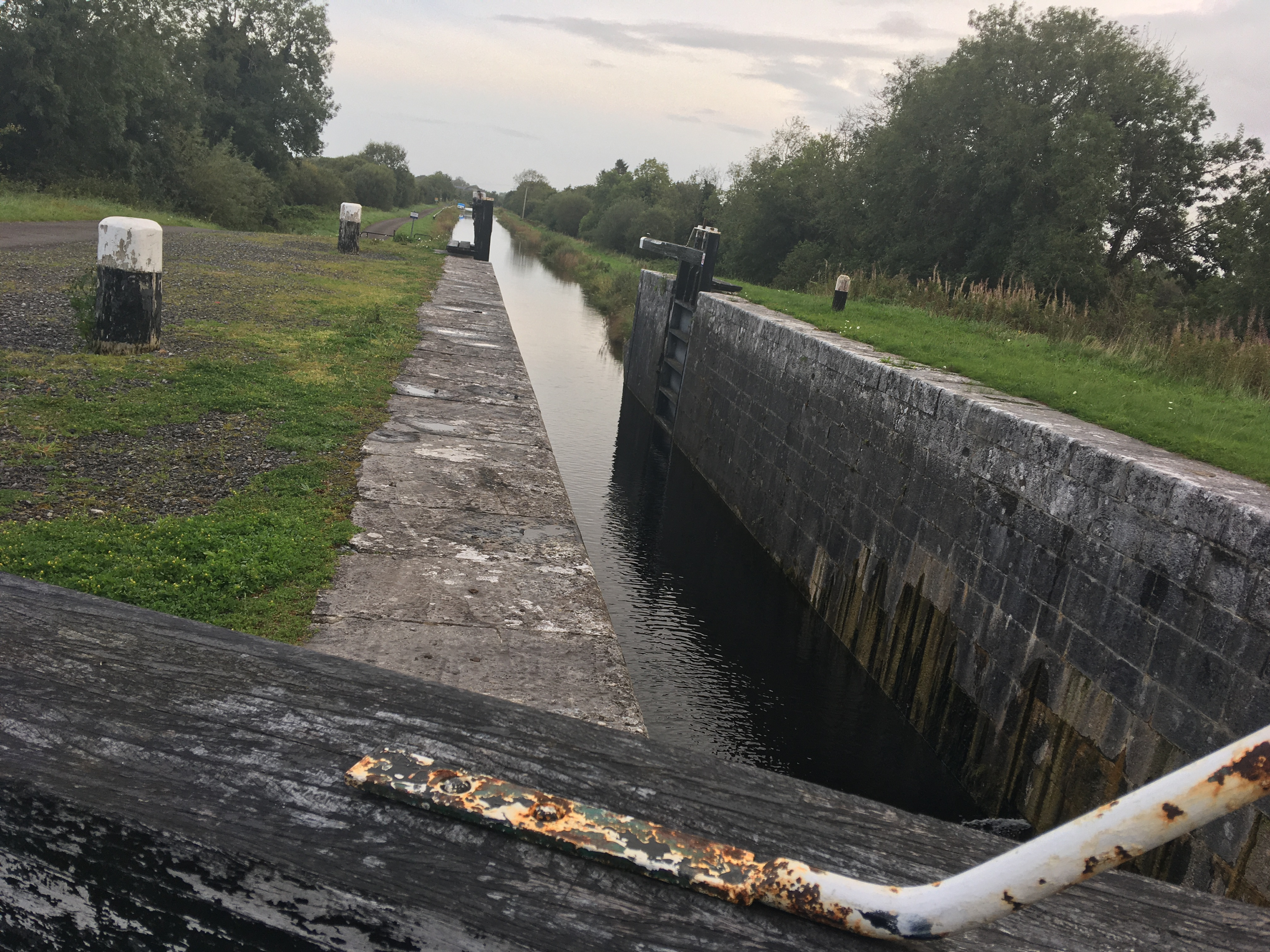

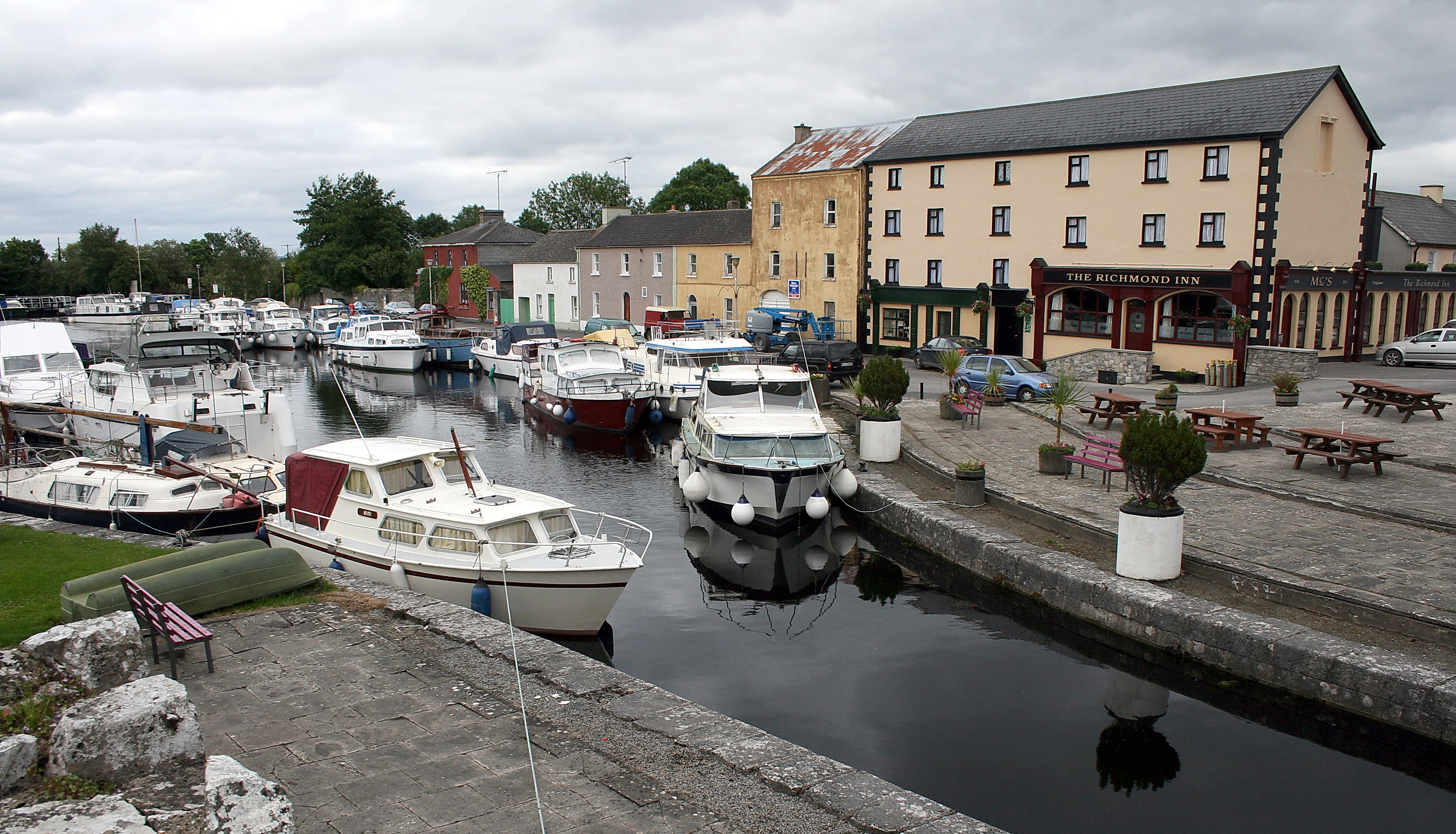

== Development ==
The development of the greenway, by Waterways Ireland with the local authorities along the route, was supported by government departments for Local Government, Tourism and Public Expenditure.

== See also ==
- EuroVelo
