= Etchen =

Etchen may refer to:

- Frederick Etchen, a 1924 Olympic sport shooter
- Saint Etchen, an Irish saint
- South Coffeyville, Oklahoma, formerly named Etchen in 1909 after local John P. Etchen
