= Kilcock =

Town in County Kildare, Ireland

Kilcock Cill Choca
- Town
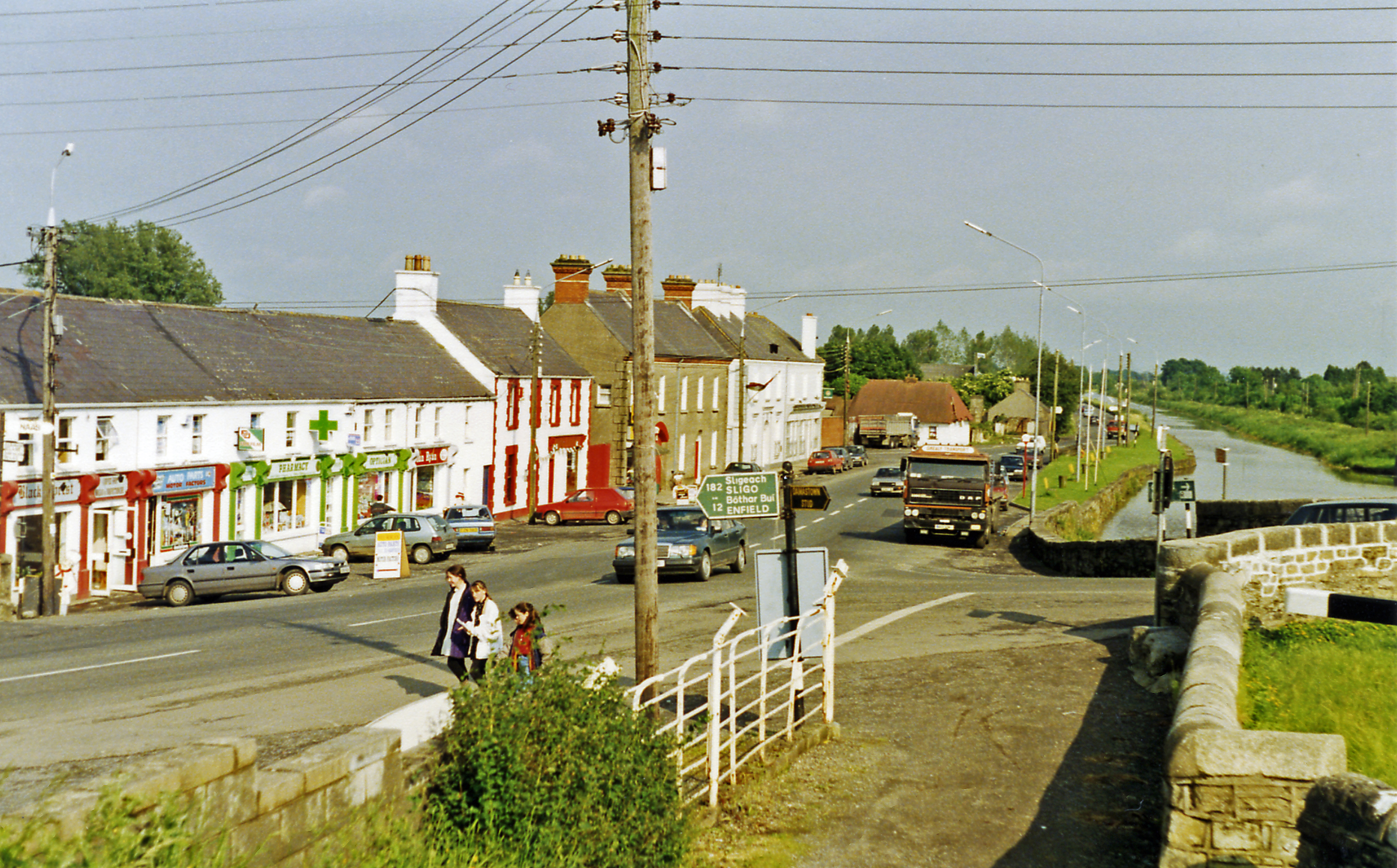
- Kilcock in the 1990s

- Location in Ireland
- Coordinates: 53°24′01″N 6°40′05″W
- Country: Ireland
- Province: Leinster
- County: County Kildare

Population (2022)
  - Total: 8,674
- Time zone: UTC±0 (WET)
  - Summer (DST): UTC+1 (IST)
- Eircode: W23
- Telephone area code: 01
- Irish grid reference: O003360

Kilcock (Irish: Cill Choca, meaning 'church of St Cocha') is a town and townland in the north of County Kildare, Ireland, on the border with County Meath. As of the 2022 census, it had a population of 8,674, making it the eighth largest town in County Kildare and 61st largest in Ireland. The town is 28 kilometres (17 mi) west of Dublin city centre (34 kilometres (21 mi) by road), and is on the Royal Canal. It is in a civil parish of the same name.

Local industries include a large Musgrave Group distribution centre, which supplies SuperValu and Centra stores across much of the country.

== History ==
Kilcock takes its name from the 6th century Saint Coca who founded a church beside the Rye River, a major tributary of the River Liffey. The saint is traditionally said to have been a sister of St. Kevin of Glendalough; by occupation, she was an embroiderer of church vestments, including those for St. Colmcille. A holy well dedicated to Coca, formerly thought to be lost in the back-yards of Kilcock, is believed locally to be in the area behind the Permanent TSB building, and her feast is remembered on 6 June. However, this commemoration is a modern revival as when the Ordnance Survey of the area was being made in 1837 it was recorded that "there is no old church in ruins in this parish nor is any patron saint or day remembered... the meaning of the name Cille Choc is not remembered." When the present parish church was dedicated in 1867 it was named for St. Coca, and it had cost £10,000 to build to the design of architect J.J. McCarthy.

In the 8th century, there was a battle between rival kings near the church of St. Coca, then in the territory of Carbury and close to the border between Leinster and Meath. There is a gap of several hundred years until the next reference to Kilcock when, in 1303, it belonged to the Hospital of St. John of Jerusalem at Kilmainham.

In the 17th century, markets and fairs were held regularly in Kilcock. The tolls and duties of Kilcock Fairs were shared between the Wogans of Rathcoffey and the Eustaces of Castlemartin, Kilcullen, County Kildare. Kilcock had 70 acres (28 ha) of common land to which several inhabitants had a common right. There was also a Commons at Courtown (Bawnogue & Duncreevan) and Laragh Commons.

The markets in Kilcock were probably the largest in North Kildare. A measure of oats in those times was referred to as a "Kilcock Measure."

Historical population
Year	Pop.	±%
1821	1,497	—
1831	1,730	+15.6%
1841	1,327	−23.3%
1851	1,164	−12.3%
1861	873	−25.0%
1871	764	−12.5%
1881	721	−5.6%
1891	647	−10.3%
1901	662	+2.3%
1911	590	−10.9%
1926	562	−4.7%
1936	475	−15.5%
1946	492	+3.6%
1951	670	+36.2%
1956	722	+7.8%
1961	739	+2.4%
1966	815	+10.3%
1971	827	+1.5%
1981	1,150	+39.1%
1986	1,414	+23.0%
1991	1,551	+9.7%
1996	1,825	+17.7%
2002	2,985	+63.6%
2006	4,100	+37.4%
2011	5,533	+35.0%
2016	6,093	+10.1%
2022	8,674	+42.4%

== Transport ==
=== Road ===
The M4 motorway opened in 1994 and bypasses Kilcock to the south of the town. The motorway connects Dublin to the west of the country. There is a National Roads Authority (NRA) plan to create an outer orbital motorway, which would extend 80 km from Naas to Drogheda, via Kilcock.

=== Bus ===
Bus Éireann route 115, from Dublin to Enfield/Mullingar, operates through the town. The area is also served by the less frequent 115C which operates to Mullingar via Summerhill, Ballivor and Killucan.

=== Railways ===
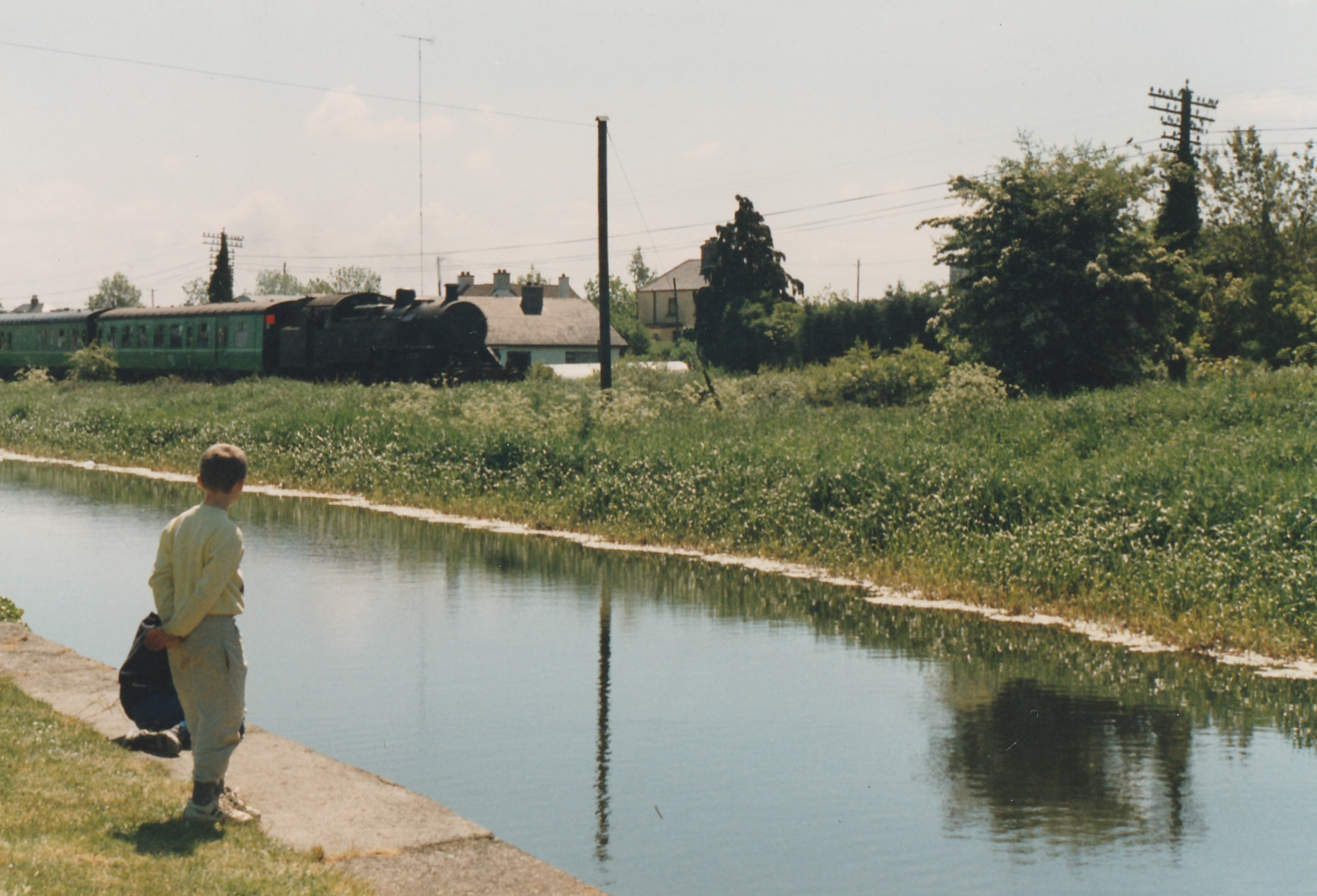
Children watching a steam train pass by the town in 1991

Kilcock railway station was opened on 28 June 1847, and was replaced on 1 July 1848. The station closed to passenger traffic on 10 November 1947. A new railway station under Shaw Bridge opened in 1998.

=== Waterways ===
The Royal Canal from Dublin to Cloondara was opened in stages from 1790–1817, arriving in Kilcock in 1796. The navigation of the canal was closed by Coras Iompair Éireann in 1961. The Royal Canal Greenway, a 130 km greenway along the canal, was launched in 2021 following the reopening of the canal to navigation in 2010.

== Education ==
Kilcock has three primary schools: Scoil Chóca Naofa, St. Joseph's BNS (which since September 2016 changed from single-sex schools to mixed schools and both schools are linked with each other), and Gaelscoil Uí Riada (an all-Irish school). The latter is located beside the Bánóg on the outskirts of the village.

Kilcock is also home to the secondary school Scoil Dara. Located on Church Street, it accommodates over 900 students from Kilcock and surrounding areas including Donadea, Summerhill, Enfield, Moynalvey and Mulhussey.

== Places of interest ==
The town's library features mementos of the poet Teresa Brayton who was born in Kilbrook. The Old Bog Road, 4.5 km west of the town, was the subject of one of her verses. It was set to music by Madeline King O'Farrelly and recorded by artists including Josef Locke, Johnny McEvoy, Finbar Furey, Daniel O'Donnell, and Finbar Wright.

There is also the old manor where Lady Catherine McCormack was born in the 1800s.

Also nearby, in Calgath, County Meath, is "Bridestream" (an 18th-century house which is the headquarters to a local business), and "Larchill", an 18th-century Ferme Ornée (ornamental farm). Larchill was restored from the mid-1990s, and there are walkways through beech avenues linking several classical and gothic follies. There is also a 8-acre (32,000 m^{2}) lake with two island follies, a formal walled garden with shell-lined tower and a model gothic farmyard.

Kilcock Art Gallery was established in 1978 by Breda Smyth and opened by George Campbell, RHA.

Kilcock has a greenway cycle/walkway which runs from Maynooth through Kilcock towards Cloondara, County Longford.

== Economy and community ==
The town has a Tesco Express store which opened in 2011, a Lidl store which opened in February 2013, and also a SuperValu store which opened in June 2016. Kilcock Business Association has in excess of 50 members.

Kilcock Musical & Dramatic Society (KMDS) is an amateur musical society affiliated to the Association of Irish Musical Societies (AIMS), in existence since 1970. The society has produced a number of productions, both musical and non-musical since 1983. For example, the society presented the musical Oklahoma! in 2012.

== Sport ==
=== GAA ===
Kilcock GAA Club is situated in the townland of Branganstown and was founded on 1 May 1887. A clubhouse was opened in 2002, consisting of a bar, sports hall and changing rooms. The club has won the Kildare Senior Football Championship five times. The club caters to over 60 teams.

=== Football ===
As of 2022, there was one football club in the town, Kilcock Celtic.

=== Canoeing and canoe polo ===
Kilcock's proximity to the Royal Canal makes it a common spot for canoeing. Kilcock Canoe Polo Club (KCPC) was founded in 1998, and occupies a site in the harbour at Kilcock on the Royal Canal. The club hosts training sessions in canoe polo, and the European Canoe Polo Championship was held there in 2003.

=== Basketball ===
Kilcock Tigers Basketball Club was established in 2000 and is based in Scoil Dara. The club has under 11 and under 18 teams for boys and girls. Kilcock Tigers is based in the Dublin Leagues and is a member of the Dublin Ladies Basketball Board and the Dublin Men's Basketball Board.

=== Athletics ===
St. Coca's Athletic Club in Kilcock was established in the 1970s. A number of club members have competed nationally and internationally. Training takes place at a running track in the Bawnogue.

=== Rugby, hockey and cricket ===
North Kildare RFC, which is a part of North Kildare Club, is located in the Maws, Kilcock, and was founded in 1928.

== Notable people ==
- John Kenny, president of the Clan-na-Gael in New York, who ran a mission to Germany in September 1914 to request guns and military assistance from the German government, and delivered funds from America to Irish Volunteers HQ in Dublin
- Ciarán Kilduff, a League of Ireland footballer.
- Brian Murray, a Donegal footballer who won an All-Ireland SFC medal in 1992. Currently lives in Kilcock
- Pádraig Nolan, a Kildare footballer and manager
- Mick O'Brien, an Irish international footballer who was capped 14 times between the years 1921 and 1927
- Derek Warfield, a former member of the Wolfe Tones, lives in Kilcock

== See also ==
- List of towns and villages in Ireland
