= Killucan railway station =

Former railway station in Killucan, Ireland

Coordinates: 53.4934°N 7.1565°W

Killucan station is a former railway station which served the village of Killucan in County Westmeath, Ireland. Previously a stop on the Dublin–Sligo railway line, the station closed in 1963.

== History ==
The station first opened in 1848 serving the villages of Killucan and Rathwire. It closed to passenger traffic in 1947, and closed fully in 1963.

A locally organised campaign, which was reportedly "ongoing for more than 20 years" as of February 2022, has proposed that the railway station be reopened. A feasibility study, completed by Irish Rail in 2024, suggested creating more bus routes in the area as opposed to reopening the station.
