= Royal Canal =

19th-century construction in Ireland

Coordinates: 53°21′N 6°14′W

Royal Canal An Chanáil Ríoga
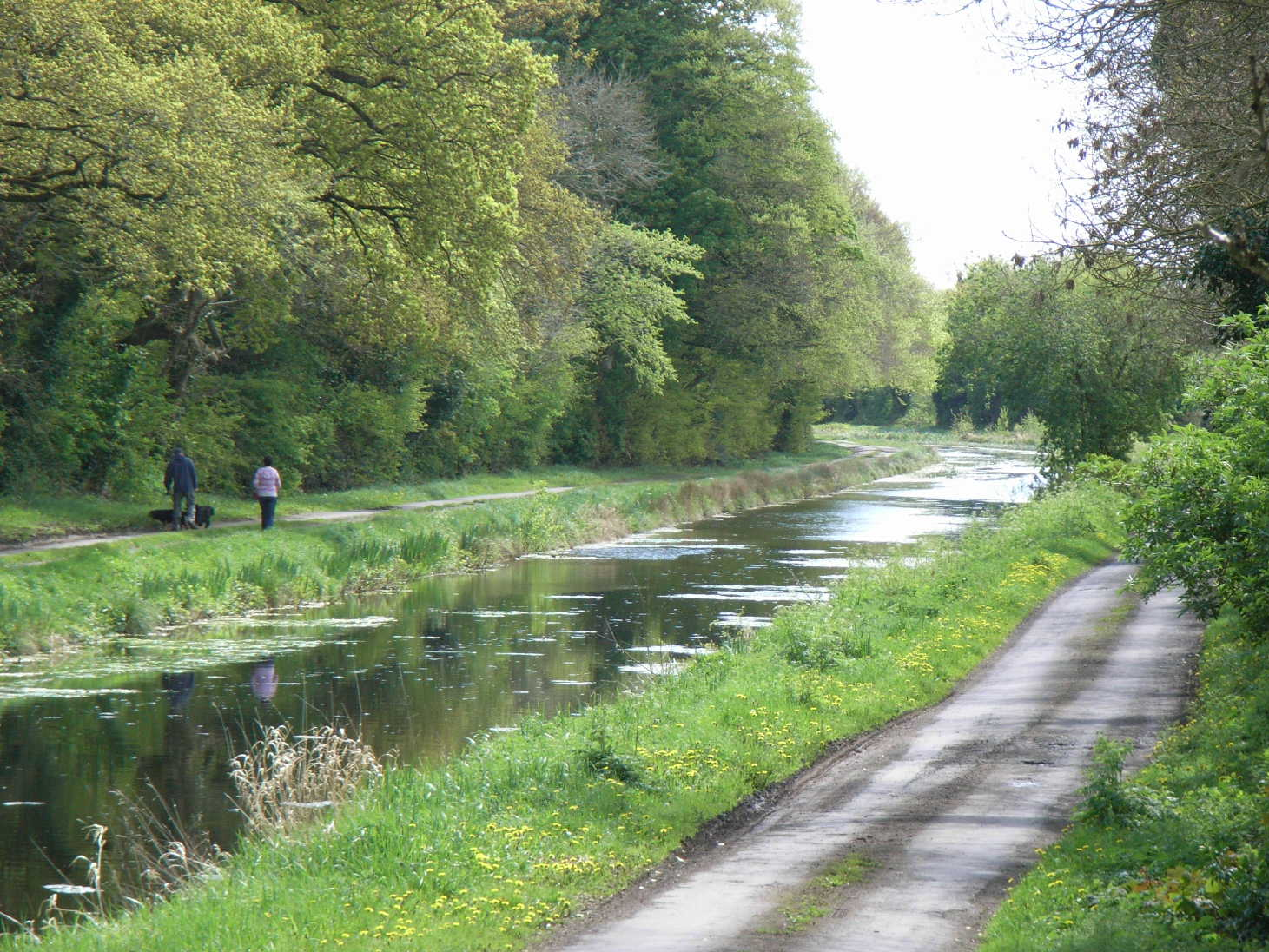
- Royal Canal from D'Arcy's bridge, County Westmeath
- Interactive map of Royal Canal; An Chanáil Ríoga

Specifications
- Length: 145 km (90 miles)
- Maximum boat beam: 13 ft 3 in (4.04 m) (originally 13 ft 3 in or 4.04 m) (narrowest lock No.17)
- Locks: 46
- Status: Open
- Navigation authority: Waterways Ireland

History
- Construction began: May 1790
- Date completed: 1817
- Date closed: 1961
- Date restored: 2010

Geography
- Start point: Spencer Dock, Dublin (originally Broadstone) (Broadstone filled in)
- End point: Cloondara (Cloondara connects to the River Shannon (at Termonbarry) via the River Camlin)
- Branch: Longford Town
- Connects to: River Shannon

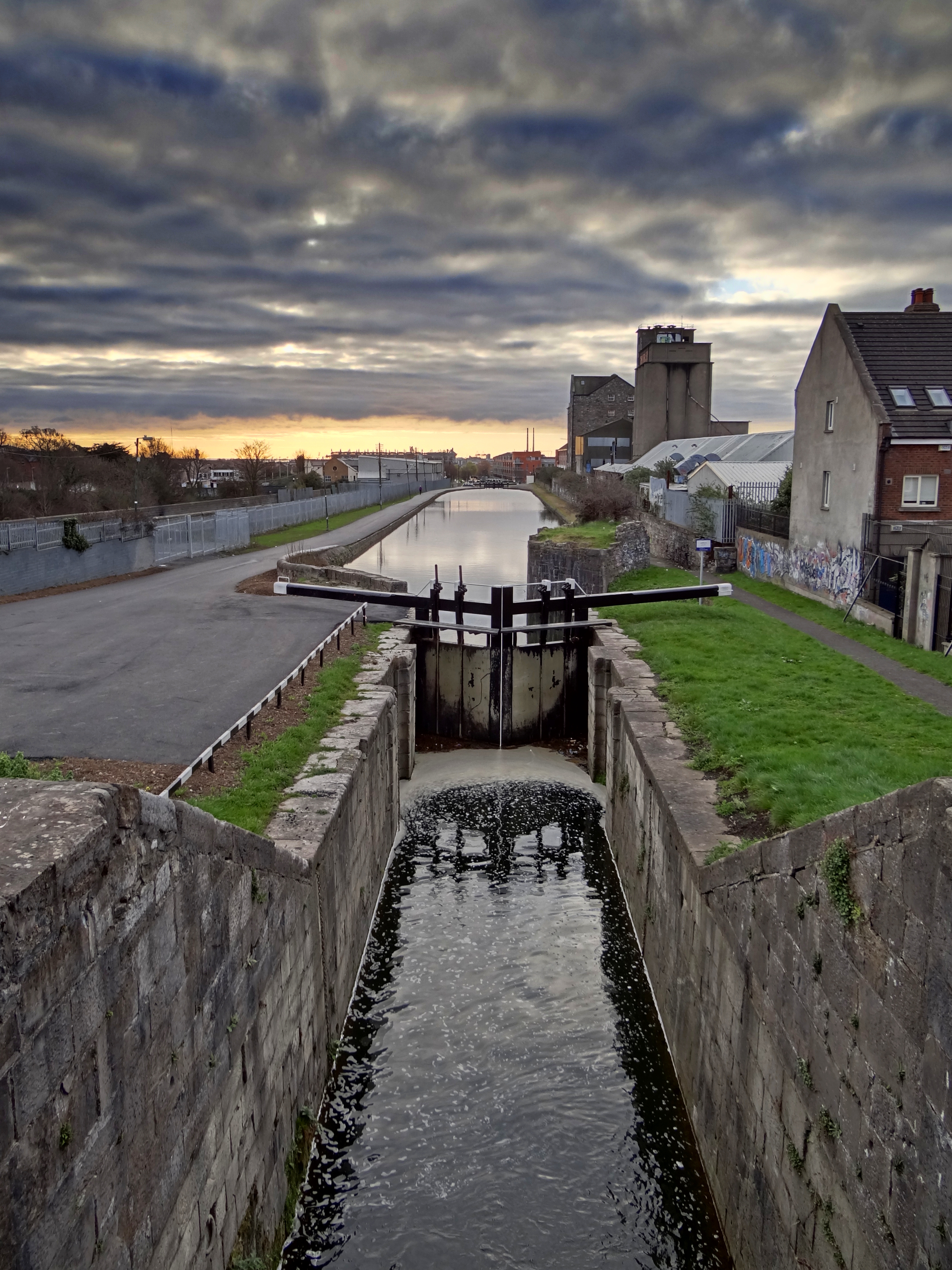
The Royal Canal as it enters Dublin city

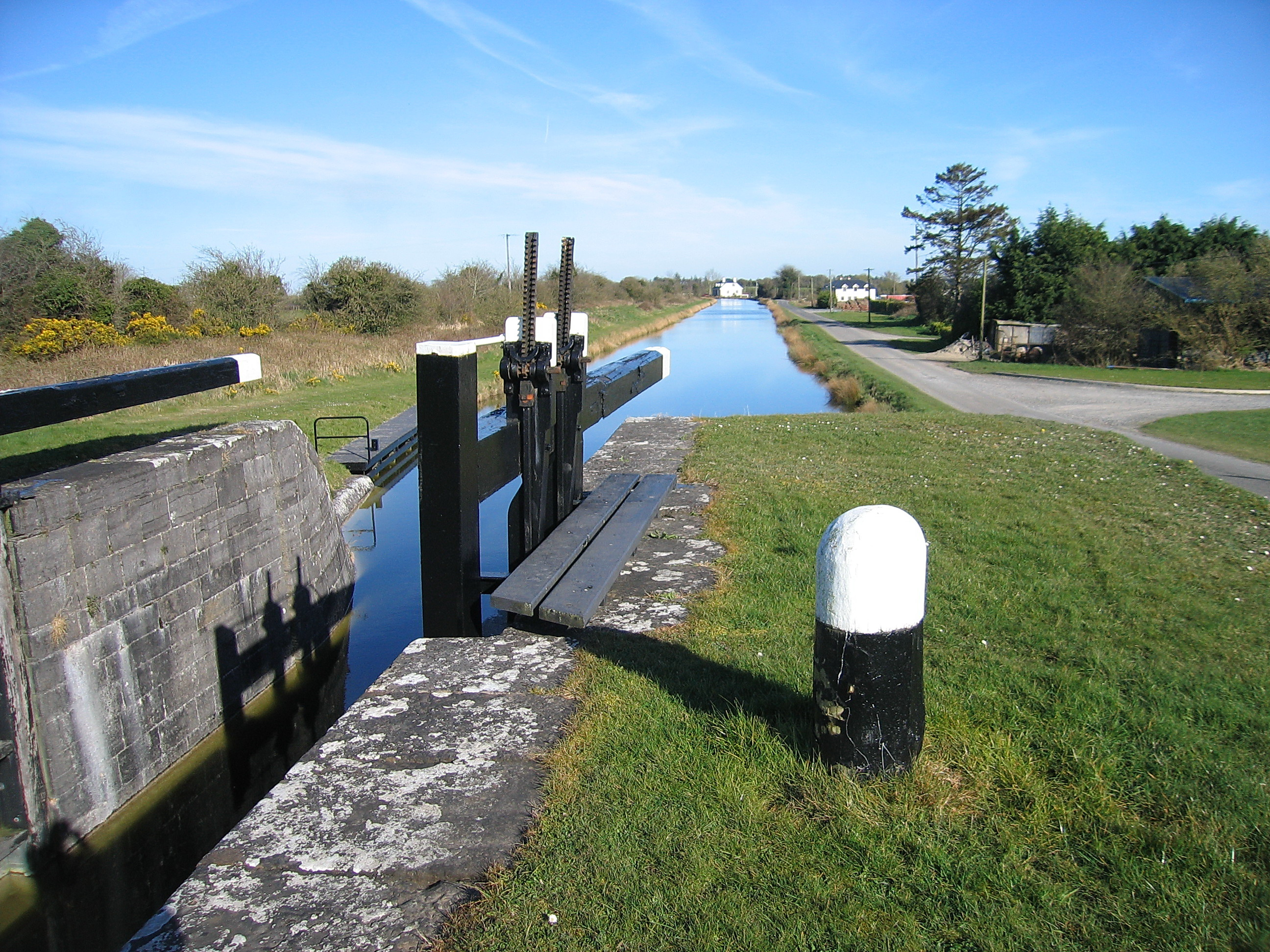
Royal Canal in rural County Westmeath north of Kinnegad

The Royal Canal (Irish: An Chanáil Ríoga) is a canal originally built for freight and passenger transportation from Dublin to Longford in Ireland. It is one of two canals from Dublin to the River Shannon and was built in direct competition to the Grand Canal. The canal fell into disrepair in the late twentieth century, but much of it has since been restored for navigation. The length of the canal to the River Shannon was reopened on 1 October 2010, but a final spur branch, to Longford Town, remains closed.

== History ==
Royal Canal Docks Act 1792
- Act of Parliament
- Parliament of Ireland
- Long title: An Act for enabling the Royal Canal Company to make Docks on the North Side of the River Liffey, under certain Conditions.
- Citation: 32 Geo. 3. c. 26 (I)

Dates
- Royal assent: 18 April 1792

=== Construction ===
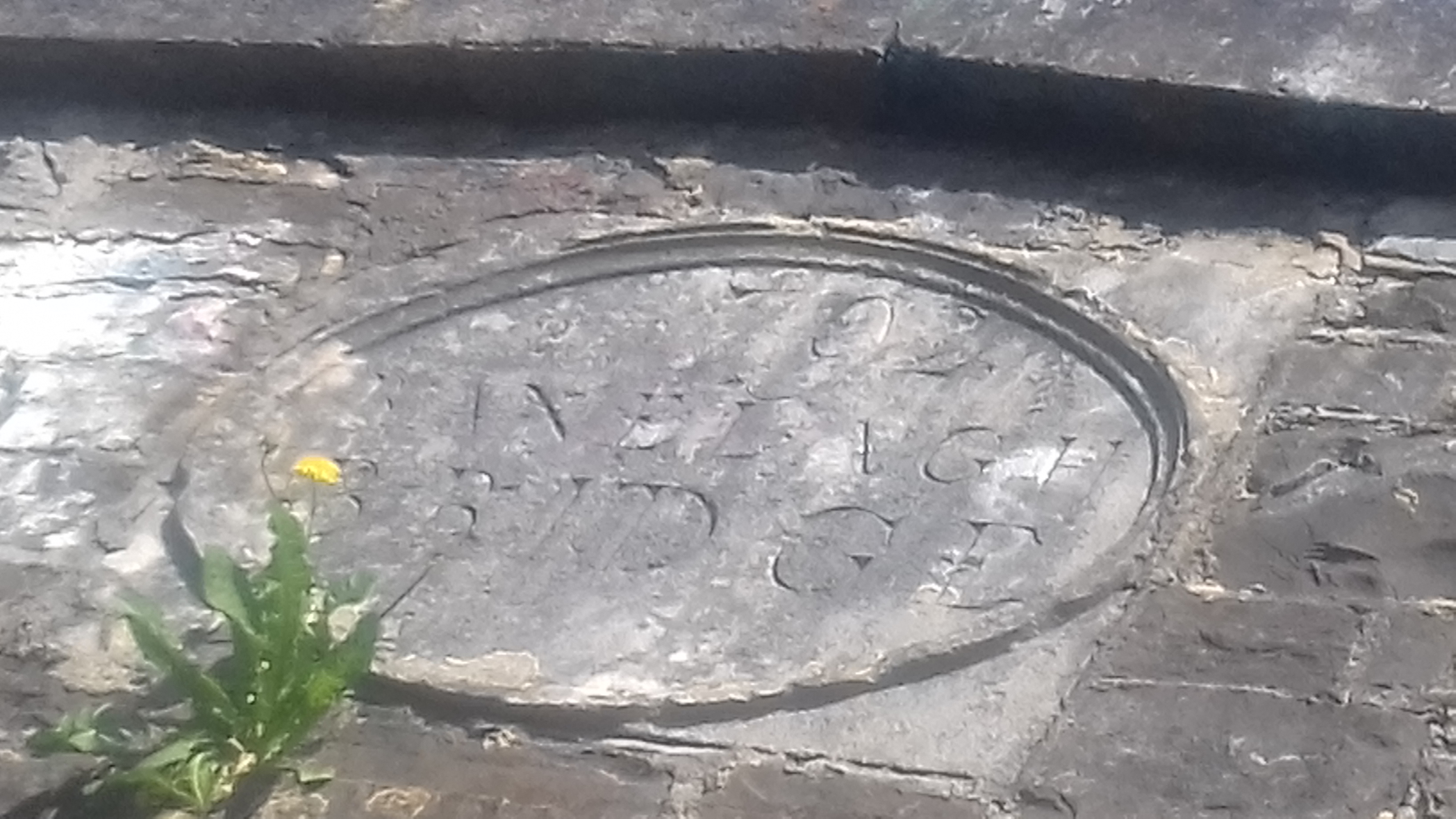
Plaque near the 12th lock naming the bridge as '1790 Ranelagh Bridge'

In 1755, Thomas Williams and John Cooley made a survey to find a suitable route for a man-made waterway across north Leinster from Dublin to the Shannon. They originally planned to use a series of rivers and lakes, including the Boyne, Blackwater, Deel, Yellow, Camlin and Inny and Lough Derravaragh. A disgruntled director of the Grand Canal Company sought support to build a canal from Dublin to Cloondara, on the Shannon in West County Longford.

Work on this massive project commenced in May 1790 at Cross Guns Bridge, Phibsborough in a westerly direction towards Ashtown. This is commemorated in the plaque beneath the keystone of Ranelagh Bridge.

In Samuel Watson's "The Gentleman's and Citizen's Almanack" for the year 1792, it noted that the Court of Directors for the Royal Canal met at 1 Dawson Street every Tuesday and Thursday at 2 o'clock to discuss matters. At that stage, it was intended that the canal would have branches to (or near) Trim, Kells, Athboy and Castletown-Delvin.

Thomas James Rawson, in his 1807 Statistical Survey of the County of Kildare described the state of completion of the canal at the time, with 3,000 men being in constant employment on the project.

In 1817, twenty-seven years after it began, the canal reached the Shannon. The total cost of construction was £1,421,954. Building was unexpectedly expensive, and the project was ridden with problems; in 1794 the Royal Canal Company was declared bankrupt. The Duke of Leinster, a board member, insisted that the new waterway take in his local town of Maynooth. The builders had to deviate from the planned route; this necessitated the construction of a 'deep sinking' between Blanchardstown and Clonsilla. The diversion also called for the building of the Ryewater Aqueduct, at Leixlip.

=== Operation ===
In 1796, the canal reached Kilcock and trade commenced. Two passenger boats, the Camden and the Phelan, went into service on 2 December 1796, with a fare of 1s 1d (first class cabin) or 6d (second class cabin) from Dublin to Leixlip, a journey of approximately 20 km. This was much cheaper than the stagecoach at the time, which cost 8s 8d for the same journey. Passengers also had the option to dine on board the canal passenger boat, whereas this was not possible on the coach. This made a slow canal journey such as the 12 hours to Mullingar more manageable.

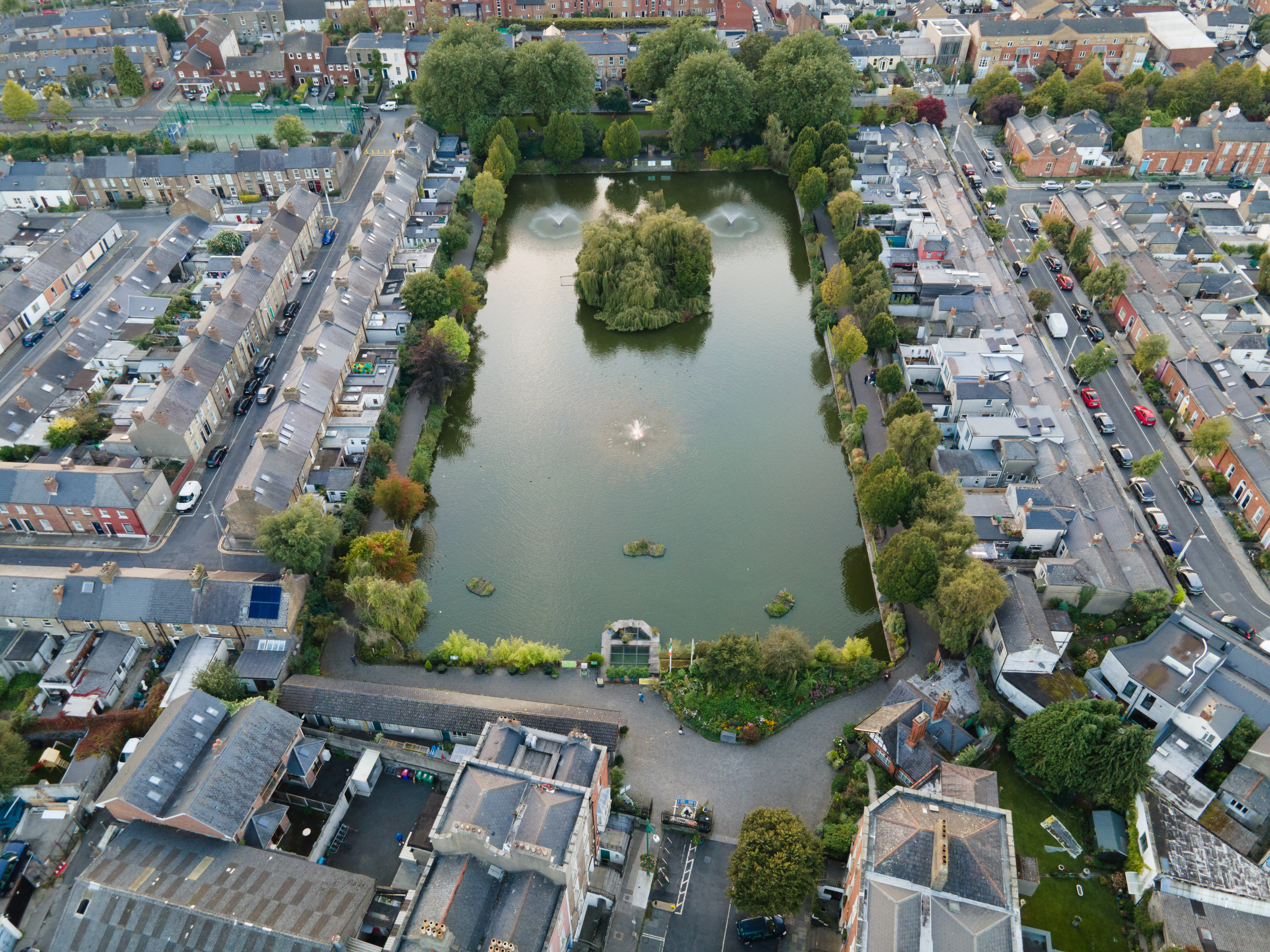
Blessington Street Basin, in the north inner-city of Dublin, opened in 1809

In the early 1800s, the canal supplied water to Dublin Corporation for its north city water supply, which could make the water level drop on the canal at times, especially during dry summers. To counteract this, a small reservoir named after King George III was opened in the north inner city in 1809, paid for by Dublin Corporation, which was fed from the 1 km-long spur that came off the Royal Canal to meet Broadstone railway station near Phibsborough. The ground alone, covering merely an acre, cost the Corporation £1,052 9s 2d. The reservoir still exists, named the Blessington Street Basin, although the spur has been filled in.

In the late 1820s, as the quality of roads in Ireland improved, road carriers such as Bianconi's Coach and Car Service began to compete with the canal as an affordable alternative public transport option.

By the 1830s the canal carried 80,000 tons of freight and 40,000 passengers a year.

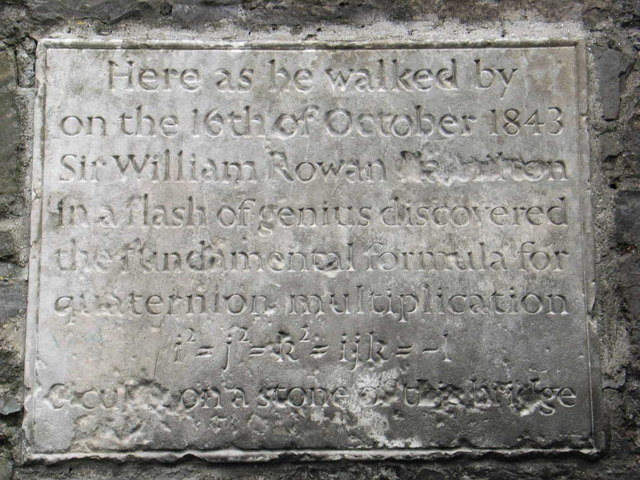
Quaternion plaque on Brougham (Broom) Bridge, Dublin

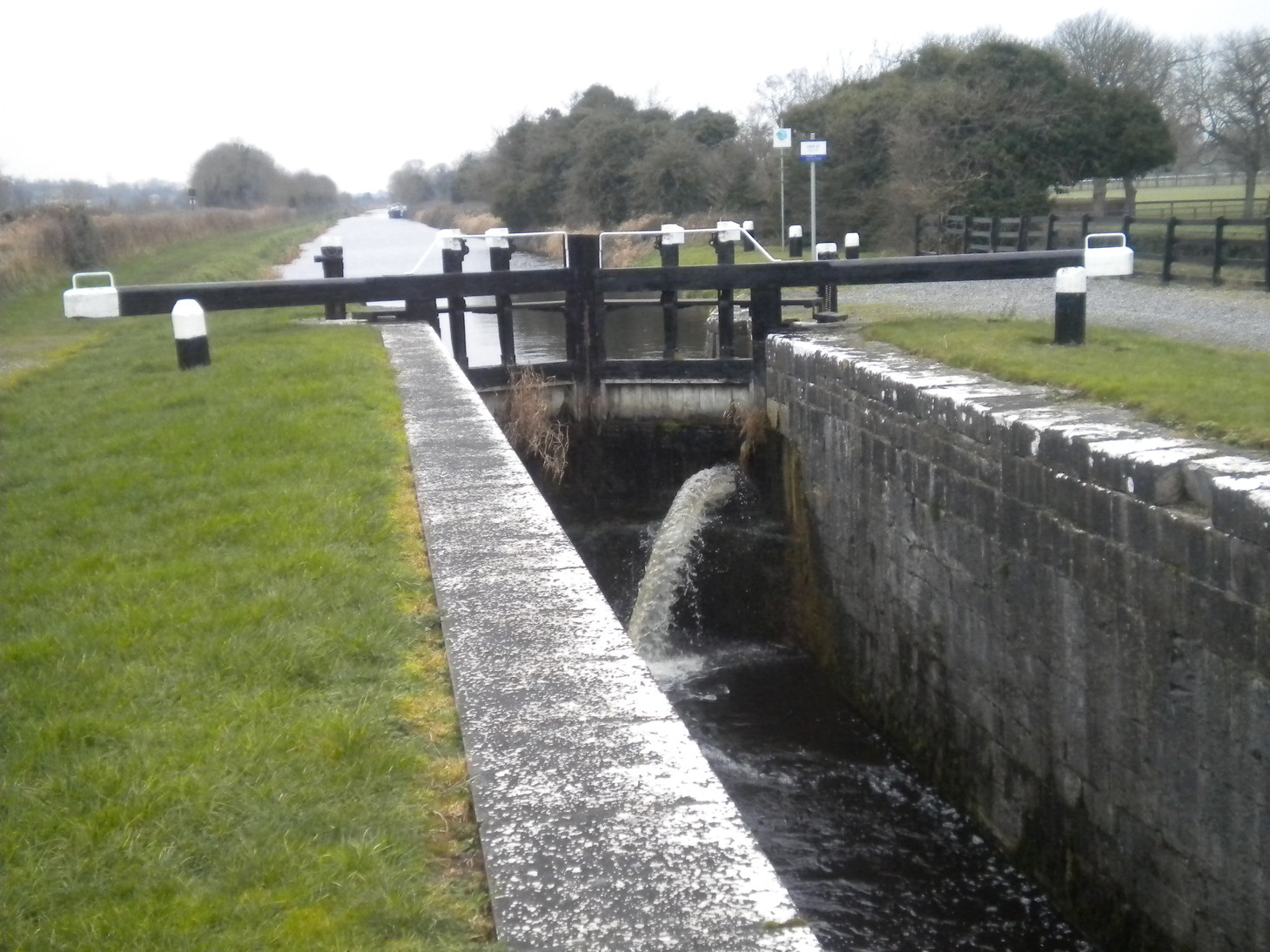
Ferns' Lock

In 1843, while walking with his wife along the Royal Canal, Sir William Rowan Hamilton realised the formula for quaternions and carved his initial thoughts into a stone on the Broom Bridge over the canal. The annual Hamilton Walk commemorates this event.

In July 1845, the Midland Great Western Railway company was formed by an act of Parliament, the Midland Great Western Railway of Ireland Act 1845 (8 & 9 Vict. c. cxix) authorising it to build a railway from Dublin to Mullingar and Longford and to purchase the Royal Canal, which they did that same year. They considered draining the canal and building a new railway along its bed; however they were "legally obliged to operate the canal as a separate transport system and so it (the Royal Canal) continued to operate". The train line was eventually laid adjacent to the canal, and the two run side by side from Dublin to Mullingar.

In November 1845, fifteen passengers, including two children, were drowned in an incident on the canal, near Clonsilla, Dublin. At approximately 4:00pm on 25 November that year, the Royal Canal Company passenger boat Longford, on its way from Dublin to Longford, was steered accidentally into the bank, turned over (with the weight of 54 passengers suddenly thrown to one side), and capsized.

In May 1847, during the Great Famine, tenants of Major Denis Mahon left his Strokestown Park estate in County Roscommon. The tenants, who would become known locally as the "Missing 1,490", had been offered a choice of emigration with assisted passage, starvation on their blighted potato farms or a place in the local workhouse. Weakened by starvation, the 1,490 walked for days along the towpaths of the Royal Canal to Dublin, where they were put on boats to Liverpool, and from there travelled to Grosse-Île, Quebec on four "coffin ships" – cargo vessels that were also, ironically, loaded with grain from Ireland, and were unsuitable for passengers. It is estimated that half of the emigrants died before reaching Grosse-Île. This was the largest single exodus of tenants during the Famine. Mahon was assassinated in November 1847, after news reached Roscommon about the fate of his former tenants. An annual walk on the canal banks commemorates these events.

The 1852 edition of Thom's Irish Almanac and Official Directory described the state of commerce on the canal, as well as intermodal passenger transport options for travellers combining rail and canal:

Trade Boats ply regularly between Dublin, Athy and Mountmellick, in the direction of the Barrow, and to Kilbeggan, Tullamore, Shannon Harbour, and Ballinasloe, in the direction of the Shannon... The river Shannon is navigable from Shannon Harbour to Limerick and Athlone, and Steam Boats ply regularly for conveyance of Goods to both these places. Passage Boats leave Sallins for Tullamore, Kilbeggan, Shannon Harbour, and Ballinasloe, upon the arrival of the train, which leaves Dublin at half-past 4 o'clock, P.M., and leave Ballinasloe, returning every day at 3 o'clock, P.M., reaching Sallins in sufficient time to meet the train arriving in Dublin at 10 o'clock the following morning.

==== Decline ====
Competition from the railways gradually eroded the canal's business, and by the 1880s annual tonnage was down to about 30,000 and the passenger traffic had all but disappeared.

The canal had a brief resurgence during World War II, when horses and barges returned. CIÉ took over the canal in 1944. As rail and road traffic increased, the canal fell into disuse. In 1951, one boat was left using the canal commercially, which ceased in July of that year. A decade later, in 1961, CIÉ closed the navigation on the canal, and placed a dam across it "three miles west of Mullingar, thereby cutting off the main water supply to the western section".

In 1974, volunteers from the Inland Waterways Association of Ireland formed the Royal Canal Amenity Group to save the canal. By 1990 they had 74 kilometres of canal, from the 12th lock in Blanchardstown to Mullingar, open again for navigation. In 2000, the canal was taken over by Waterways Ireland, a cross-border body charged with administering Ireland's inland navigations. On 1 October 2010, the whole length of the canal was formally reopened.

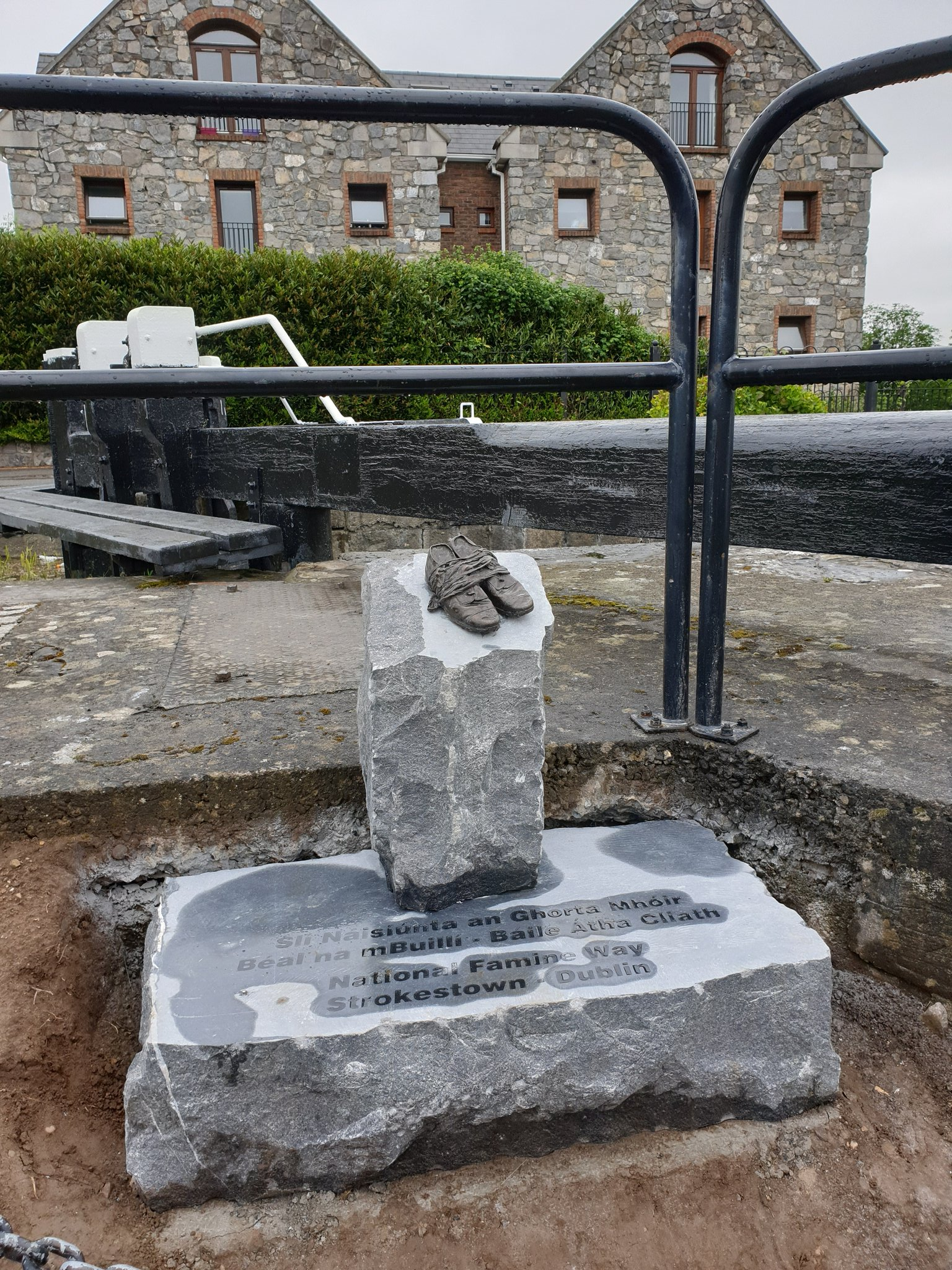
Famine Way memorial, 12th lock

== Management ==
Since the early 19th century, the canal has been maintained by eight successive agencies: the Royal Canal Company, the Commissioners of Inland Navigation, the New Royal Canal Company, Midland Great Western Railway Company, Great Southern Railways, CIÉ, the Office of Public Works (from 1986), and Waterways Ireland, in addition to the restoration and maintenance by the volunteers of the Royal Canal Amenity Group.

== Route ==
The canal passes through Maynooth, Kilcock, Enfield, Longwood, Mullingar and Ballymahon and has a spur to Longford. The total length of the main navigation is 145 kilometres (90 mi), and the system has 46 locks. There is one main feeder (from Lough Owel), which enters the canal at Mullingar.

=== Transport links ===
The Royal Canal was originally planned to terminate in Dublin at Broadstone, to serve the then fashionable area of residence, as well as King's Inns and the nearby markets, but it was extended so that now, at the Dublin end, the canal reaches the Liffey through a wide sequence of dock and locks at Spencer Dock, with a final sea lock to manage access to the river and sea.

The Dublin – Mullingar railway line was built alongside the canal for much of its length. The meandering route of the canal resulted in many speed-limiting curves on the railway. The canal was bought by the Midland Great Western Railway to provide a route to the West of Ireland, the original plan being to close the canal and build the railway along its bed.

The canal travels across one of the major junctions on the M50 where it meets the N3, in a specially constructed aqueduct.

== Present day ==
Today Waterways Ireland is responsible for the canal, and it was under their stewardship, in association with the Royal Canal Amenity Group, that the Royal Canal was officially reopened from Dublin to the Shannon on 2 October 2010. Access points currently exist near Leixlip and at Maynooth, Enfield, Thomastown, Mullingar, Ballinea Bridge and Ballynacargy.

A commemoration plaque erected at Piper's Boreen, Mullingar, marks 200 years since the canal reached Mullingar in 1806.

== Royal Canal Way ==
The EuroVelo 2 route

The Royal Canal Way is a 144-kilometre (89-mile) long-distance trail that follows the towpath of the canal from Ashtown, Dublin to Cloondara, County Longford. It is typically completed in six days. It is designated as a National Waymarked Trail by the National Trails Office of the Irish Sports Council and is managed by Waterways Ireland. In 2015, Dublin City Council began extending the walking and cycling route along the Royal Canal from Ashtown to Sheriff Street Upper. The Royal Canal Way connects with the Westmeath Way west of Mullingar and will eventually form the eastern end of the Dublin-Galway Greenway, the final part of EuroVelo Route 2, a cycling path from Moscow across Europe to Galway.

The Royal Canal Greenway is the greenway encompassing the Royal Canal Way between Maynooth and Cloondara, with a branch to Longford. It was launched in March 2021.

== Popular culture ==
=== The Auld Triangle ===
The Royal Canal was immortalised in verse by Brendan Behan in The Auld Triangle. A monument featuring Behan sitting on a bench was erected on the canal bank at Binn's Bridge in Drumcondra in 2003.

And the auld triangle went jingle jangle,
All along the banks of the Royal Canal.

== Superstition ==
Royal Canal boatmen believed the 13th lock at Deey Bridge, between Leixlip and Maynooth, was haunted. This tale became the subject of a poem by Arthur Griffith, The Spooks of the Thirteenth Lock, which in turn inspired the name of the band The Spook of the Thirteenth Lock.

== Gallery of locks from the Liffey to the Shannon ==
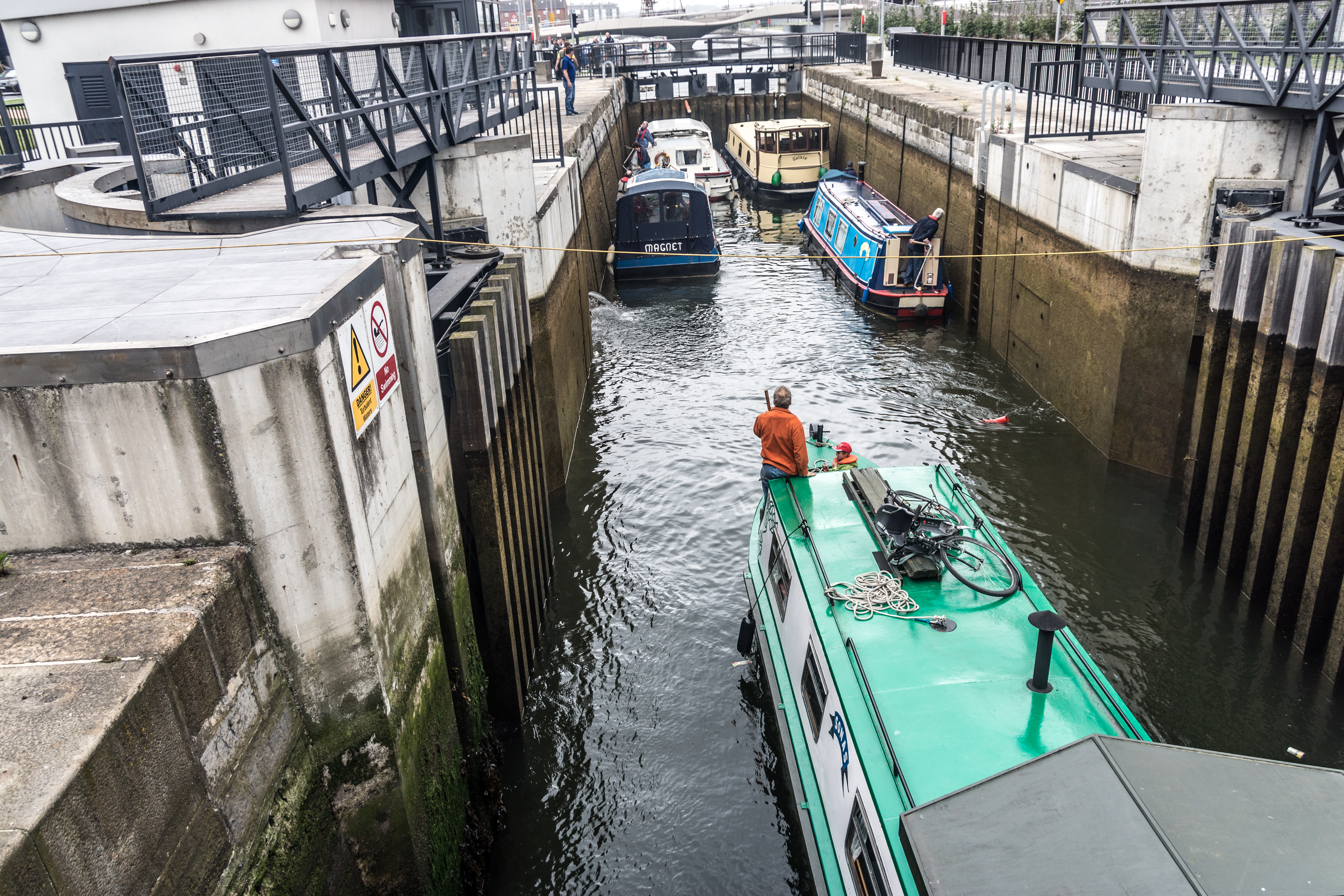
1st lock

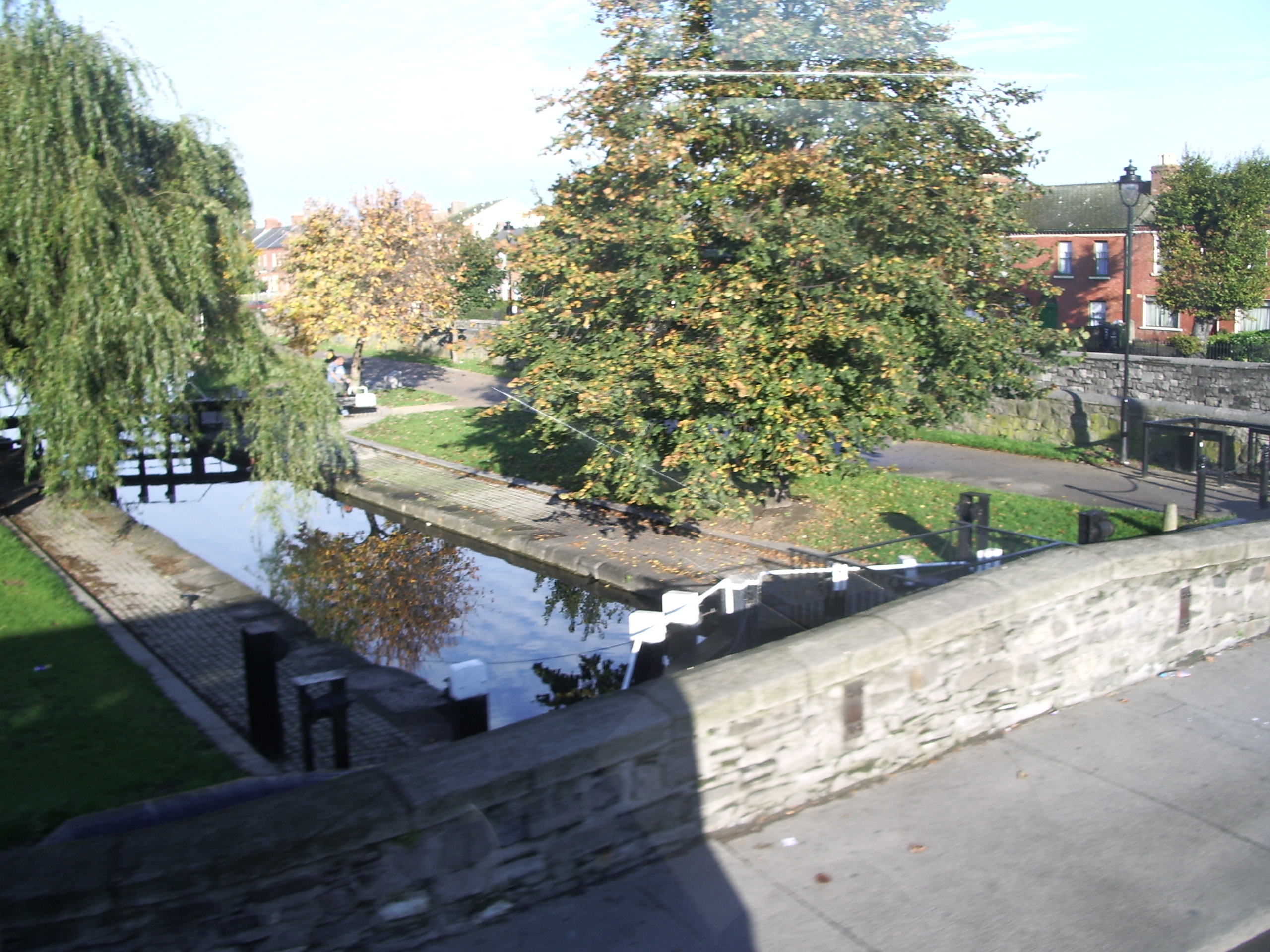
2nd lock

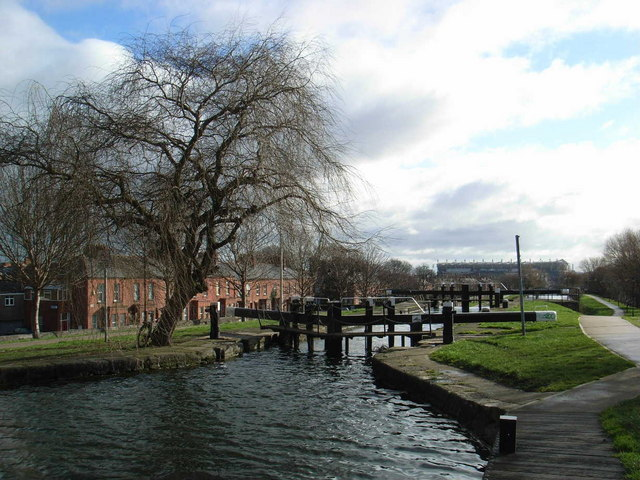
4th lock

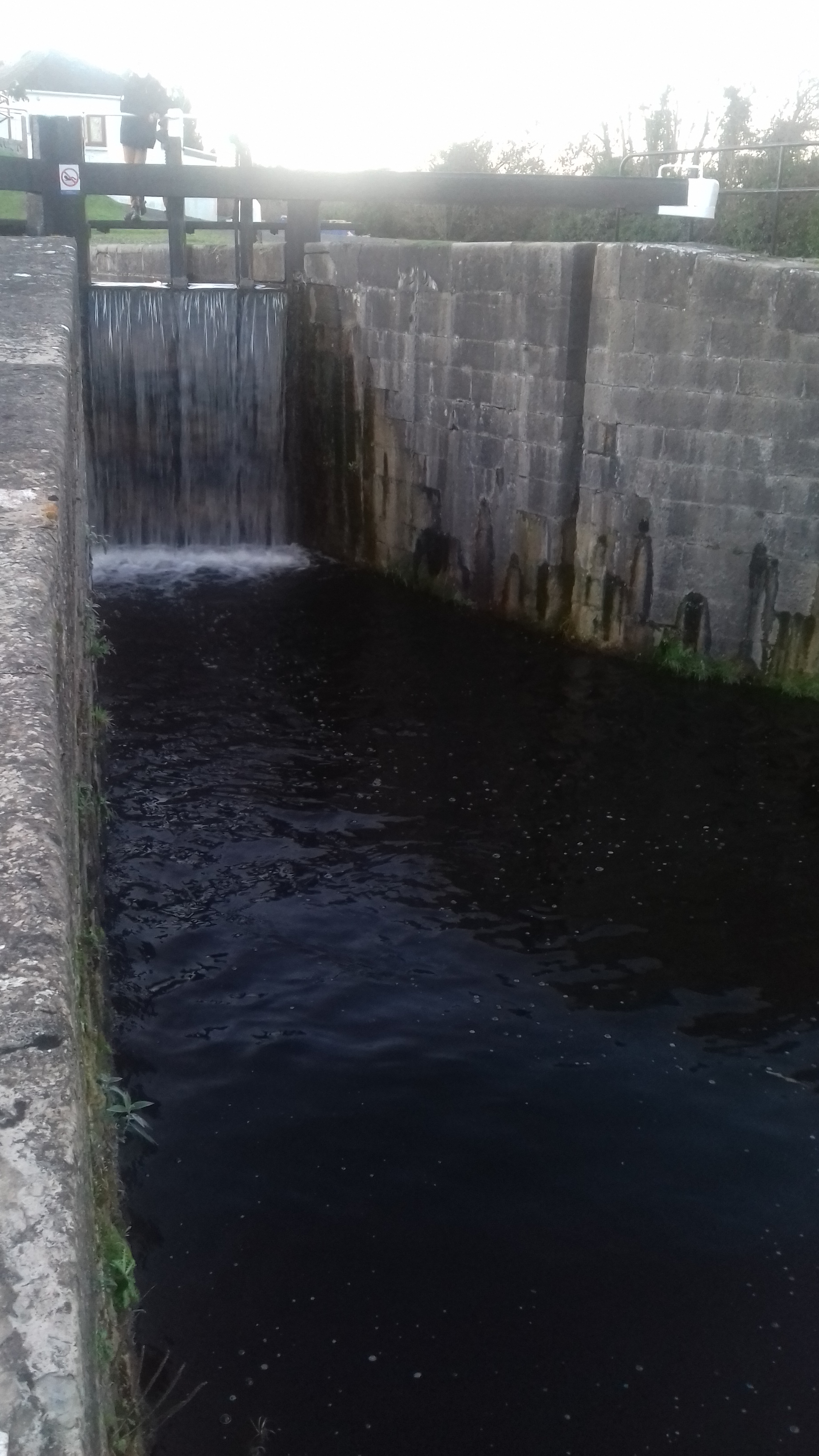
11th lock

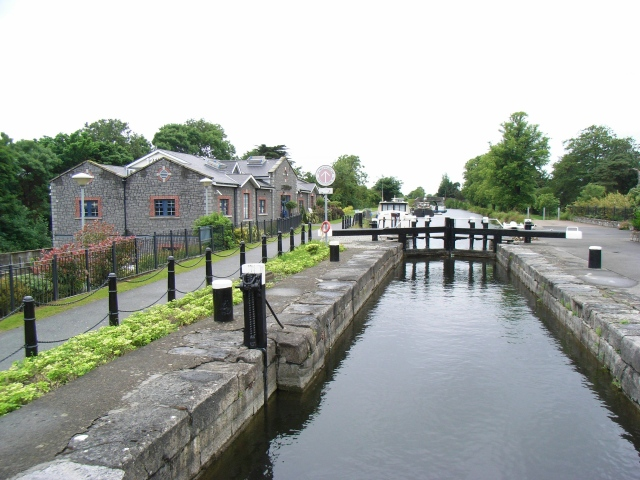
12th lock

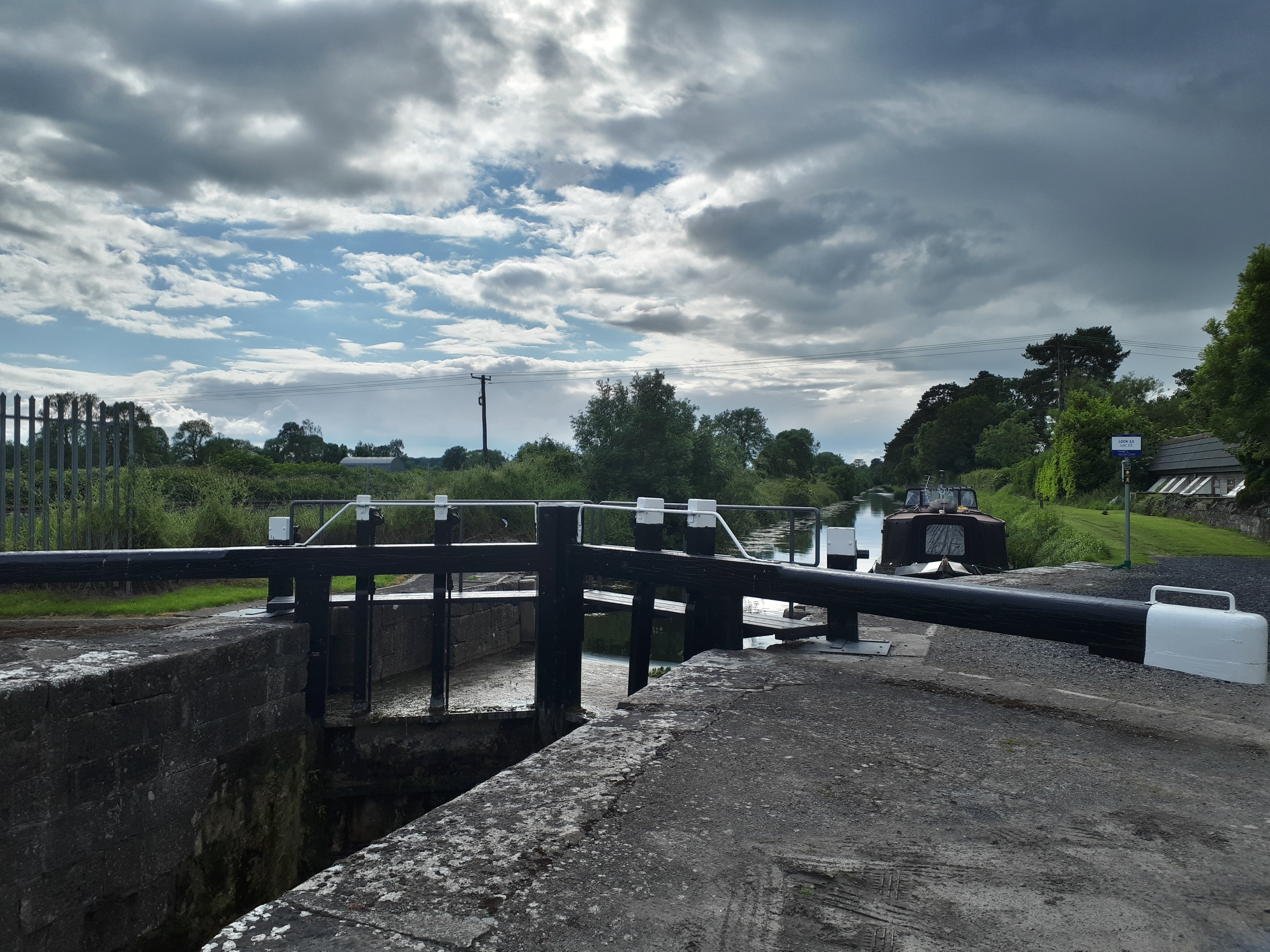
13th lock

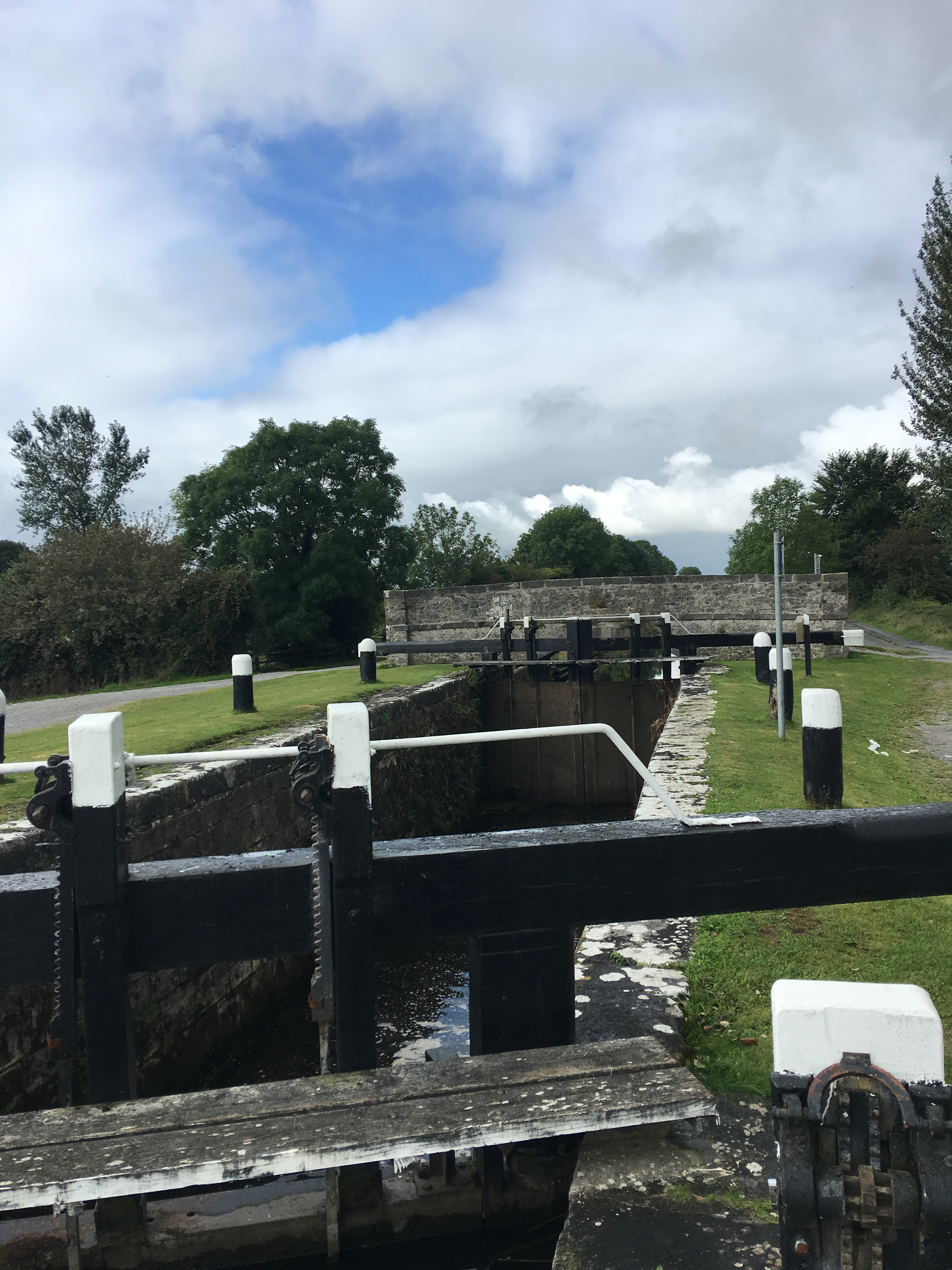
22nd lock

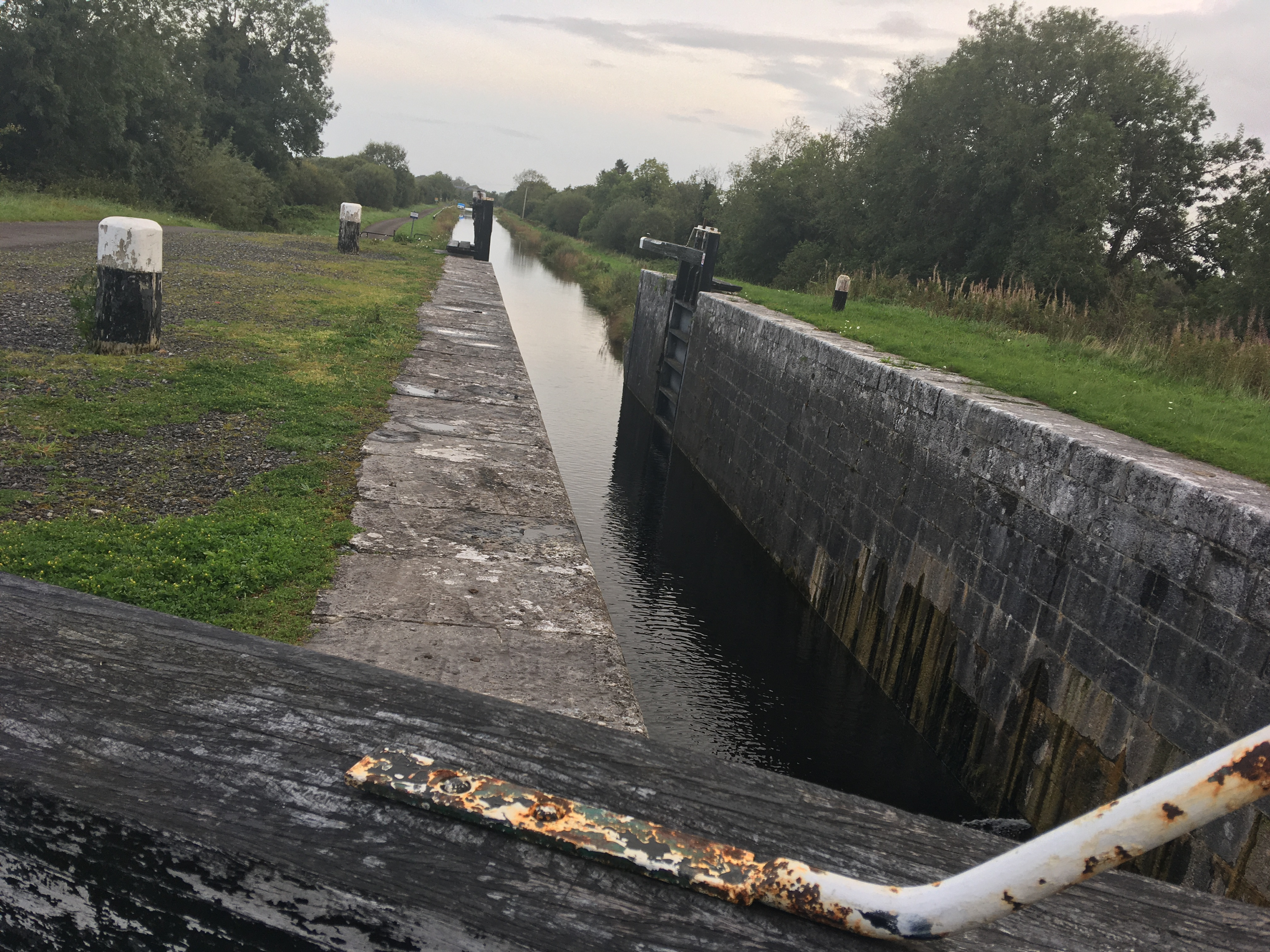
44th lock

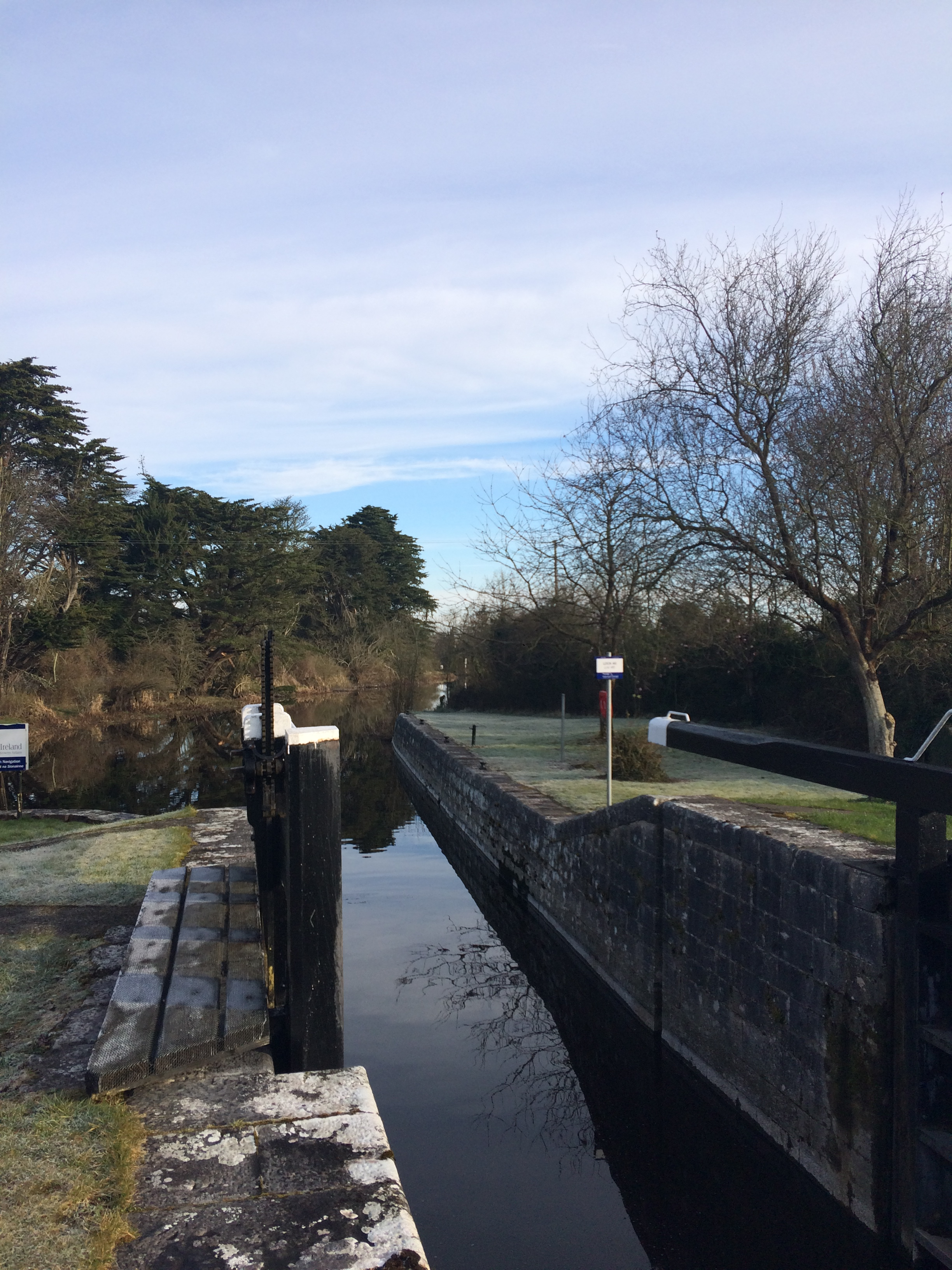
46th lock

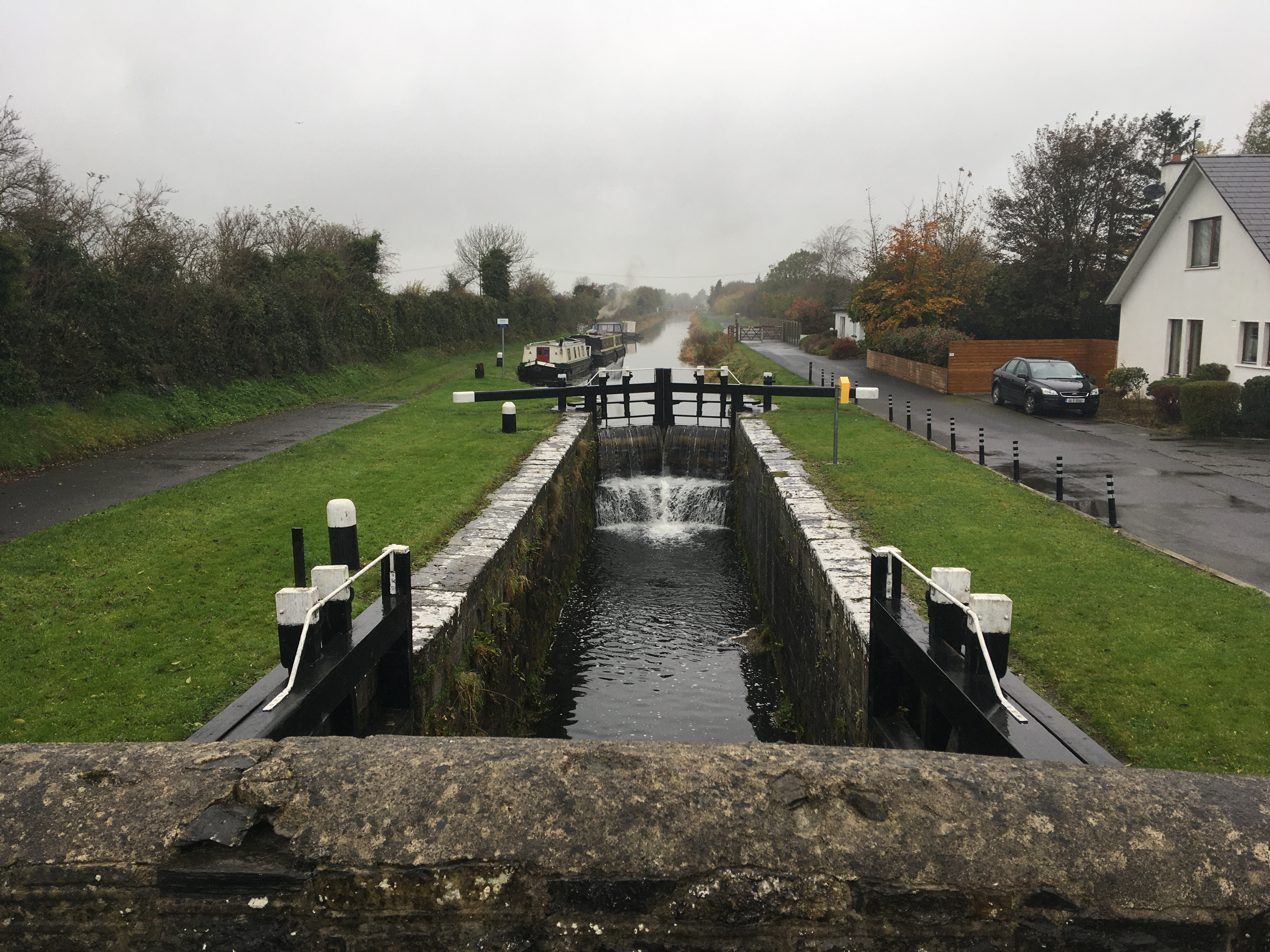
Chambers bridge and lock

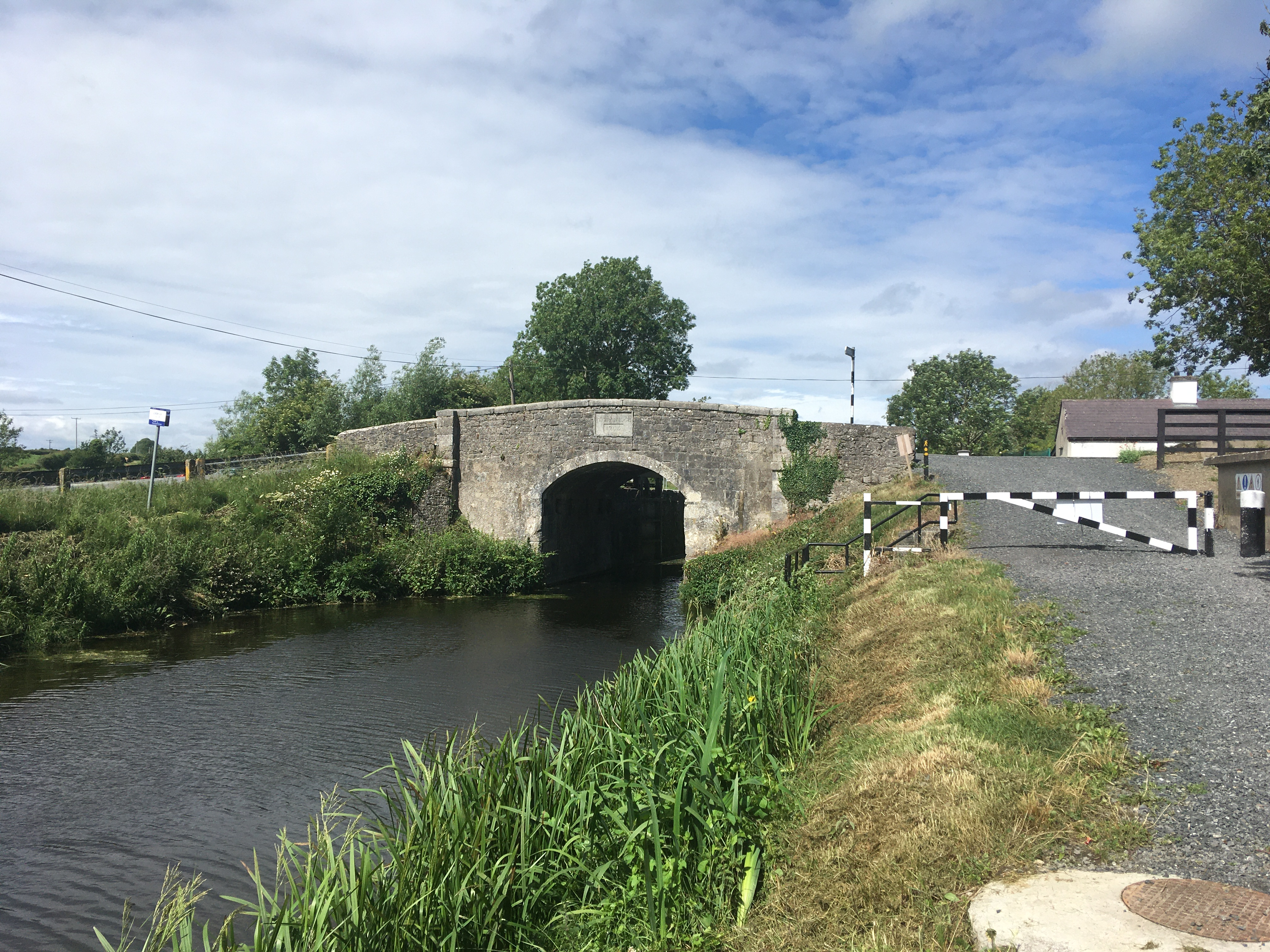
Digby bridge and lock

== See also ==
- EuroVelo
- List of bridges over the Royal Canal in Greater Dublin
- Canals of Ireland
- Rivers of Ireland
- Transport in Ireland
