= Saint Etchen =

Irish abbot and early saint

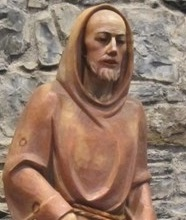
- Saint Etchen, the Farmer Bishop
- Born: 490; Leinster, Ireland
- Died: 11 February 577 (aged 86–87); Clonfad, Ireland
- Venerated in: Roman Catholic Church
- Feast: 11 February
- Attributes: farming
- Patronage: Clonfad, Farmers

St. Etchen (Etchenius, Ecian or Echen; 490 – 11 February 577) was an Irish Abbot who founded a monastery in Clonfad, County Westmeath.

== Traditional narrative ==
Legend states that Etchen ordained Columba into the priesthood, and that he had to stop in the middle of ploughing a field to perform the act.

== Death ==
Etchen died on 11 February 577AD of natural causes. He was buried at his monastery in Clonfad. His date is celebrated as the Feast of Saint Etchen in Ireland.

== Veneration ==
A number of local schools and churches are named after St. Etchen, including:

- Church of St. Etchen, Killucan
- St. Etchen National School, Kinnegad

== See also ==
- Clonfad
