= Dublin–Galway Greenway =

Rail-trail and greenway in Ireland

Coordinates: 53.5212°N 7.332551°W

Dublin-Galway Greenway
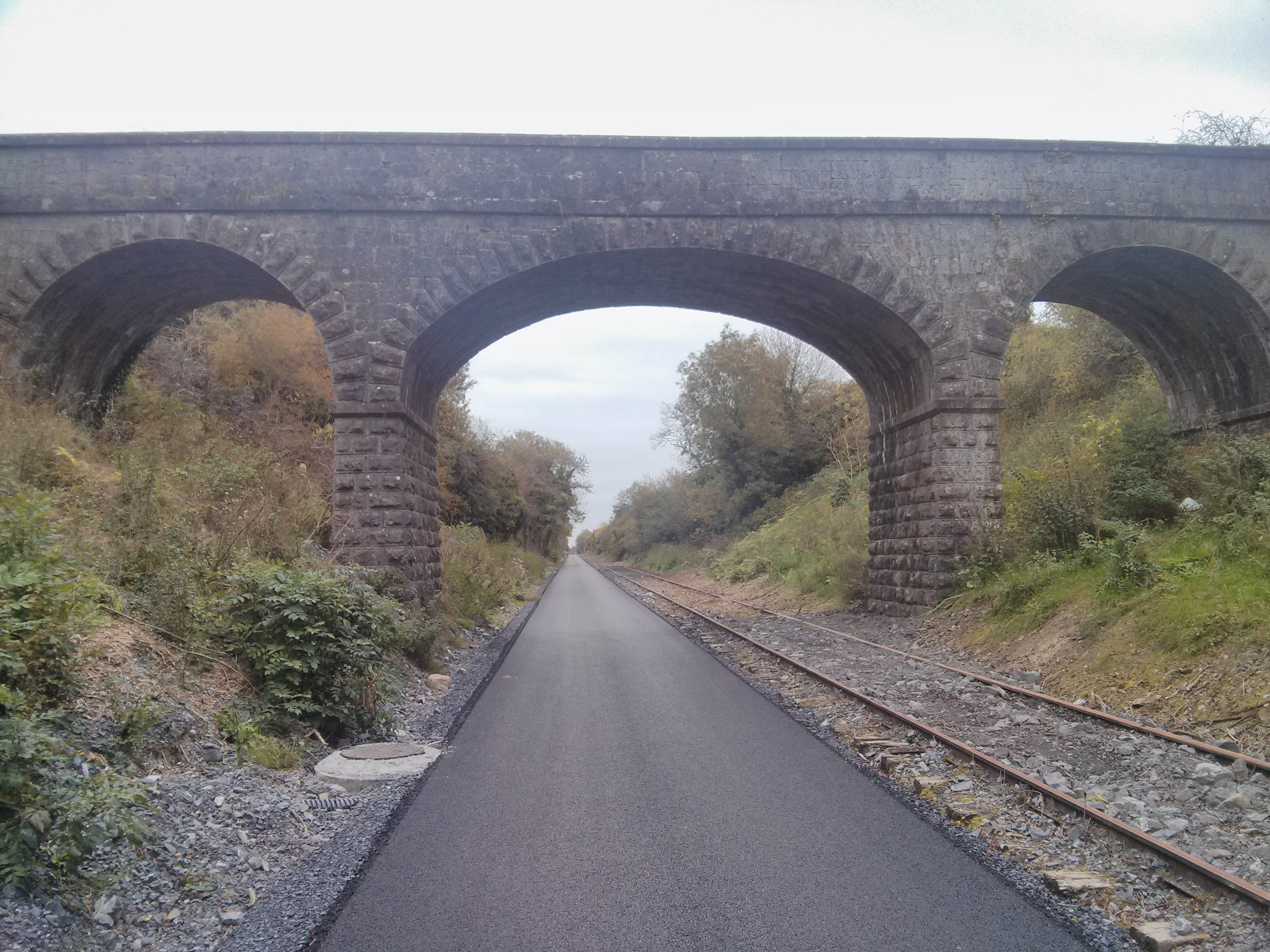
- Bridge on the greenway
- Length: 276 kilometres (171 mi)
- Location: Dublin-Galway, Ireland
- Trailheads: Sheriff Street, Dublin; Galway City
- Use: Hiking, Cycling
- Elevation gain/loss: 0m gain approximately

Map of the EuroVelo 2 route.

The Dublin–Galway Greenway is a partially completed 'coast-to-coast' greenway and partial rail trail, in Ireland, funded by the Department of Transport, which is due to become the western section of EuroVelo EV2, a cycle route from Galway, Ireland, crossing Europe and ending in Moscow, Russia. The 276 kilometres (171 mi) route was planned to be completed by 2020. It is due to be the fourth greenway in Ireland, after the Great Southern Trail, the Great Western Greenway and the Waterford Greenway.

== Sections ==
The greenway connects existing pathways, redeveloped railtrails and newly created sections.

=== Dublin City to Ashtown ===
The Greenway begins at Spencer Dock in Dublin City Centre. The section from Sheriff Street to Newcomen Bridge, a completely new section of canal-side route crossing a railway line, was completed in July 2020. The rest of the route follows the canal towpaths, which are of varying quality and includes the "Deep Sinking" section which is currently inadvisable for amateur cyclists. Upgrades of the entire length are proposed.

=== Royal Canal Way ===
The route then follows the Royal Canal Way which links Ashtown, Dublin to Longford along the Royal Canal.

Upgrade works are planned along the length of this to improve surfaces and access. The official "starting" point for the Greenway is at Maynooth harbour, 28 kilometres (17 mi) from the Eastern end of the Greenway; but works are either in planning, under construction or completed along the entire length of the Royal Canal Way.

=== Westmeath Way ===
The Westmeath way stretches 28 kilometres (17 mi) from the Meath-Westmeath border and is proposed to meet to the town of Ballinea, south-west of Mullingar.

=== Mullingar–Athlone ===
The section from Mullingar to Athlone is a rail-trail over the disused Mullingar-Athlone rail line, (with refurbished former stations in Moate and Castletown Geoghegan). The Moate-Garrycastle section was officially opened by Taoiseach Enda Kenny in October 2015. Planning permission for a new bridge in Athlone across the Shannon was granted in November 2017. Funding for this bridge and the section from Garrycastle into Athlone was announced in August 2018, and the bridge was opened in August 2023. In May 2026, the bridge was officially renamed as the Mary O'Rourke Bridge. Rail traffic through Athlone was suspended during the Easter weekend in 2019, to allow for the construction of an underpass for the greenway below the Dublin Heuston - Galway rail line. In September 2015 the Westmeath Independent reported that the greenway could provide a "€15m boost" to the local economy. A section from the white-gates level crossing to the Athlone Marina opened in October 2021.

In September 2022, funding became available from Westmeath County Council to convert the old Streamstown railway station on the trail to a café.

A community development organisation in Kilbeggan, County Westmeath plans to connect the Greenway to the Offaly Cycleways at Kilbeggan with a greenway to Tullamore, County Offaly.

=== Athlone–Galway ===
The planning of this route via Ballinasloe (as part of Ireland's Hidden Heartlands) by the National Roads Authority was requested by Galway County Council in June 2014 and was in the planning stage in July 2015. There was opposition from multiple stakeholders: the Galway Cycling Campaign objected to the proposal to place the route, the "Galway to Athlone Cycleway", near to the N6 national primary road. Teachta Dála for Galway East, Ciarán Cannon stated in September 2015 that significant numbers of local landowners also expressed concern about the preferred route. In October 2015 Minister for Transport, Tourism and Sport Paschal Donohoe announced the withdrawal of funding for the section until the concerns of local landowners had been resolved.

In January 2017, Minister Shane Ross announced a new consultation process, and 55 submissions were received by February. In 2018 this section was still in the planning phase, with funding secure from Transport Infrastructure Ireland (TII). A public project office was planned in early 2019. By July 2019 a preferred route following the rail line to Monksland, turning southwards through Crannagh More, by the River Shannon opposite Clonmacnoise, west towards Moore, crossing the R357 north of Shannonbridge, crossing the River Suck, and taking the disused Grand-Canal branch to Ballinasloe, before passing through Loughrea, Clarinbridge and Oranmore before going into Galway city, was published. Funding was allocated to Galway County Council in December 2019.

Public consultation on five potential Athlone–Galway routes began in January 2021. In December 2021, the route selection process was completed and the proposed Route 5 was selected as the preferred route to complete the Dublin–Galway Greenway. The route will pass through Shannonbridge, Ballinasloe, Clonfert, Meelick, Portumna, Woodford, Gort, Coole Park, Kinvara, Kilcolgan, Clarinbridge and Oranmore, before reaching Galway city. Ballinasloe would be connected by a branch from Shannonbridge.

Plans were still in the early stage in January 2025.

In March 2025 plans for a spur to Ballyleague, dubbed the "Lough Ree Greenway" were published for public consultation.

In June 2026, €10m funding for the 27-kilometre Athlone - Shannonbridge leg was announced by Transport Infrastructure Ireland.

== See also ==
- EuroVelo
