= Cloondara =

Cloondara Cluain Dá Ráth
- Village
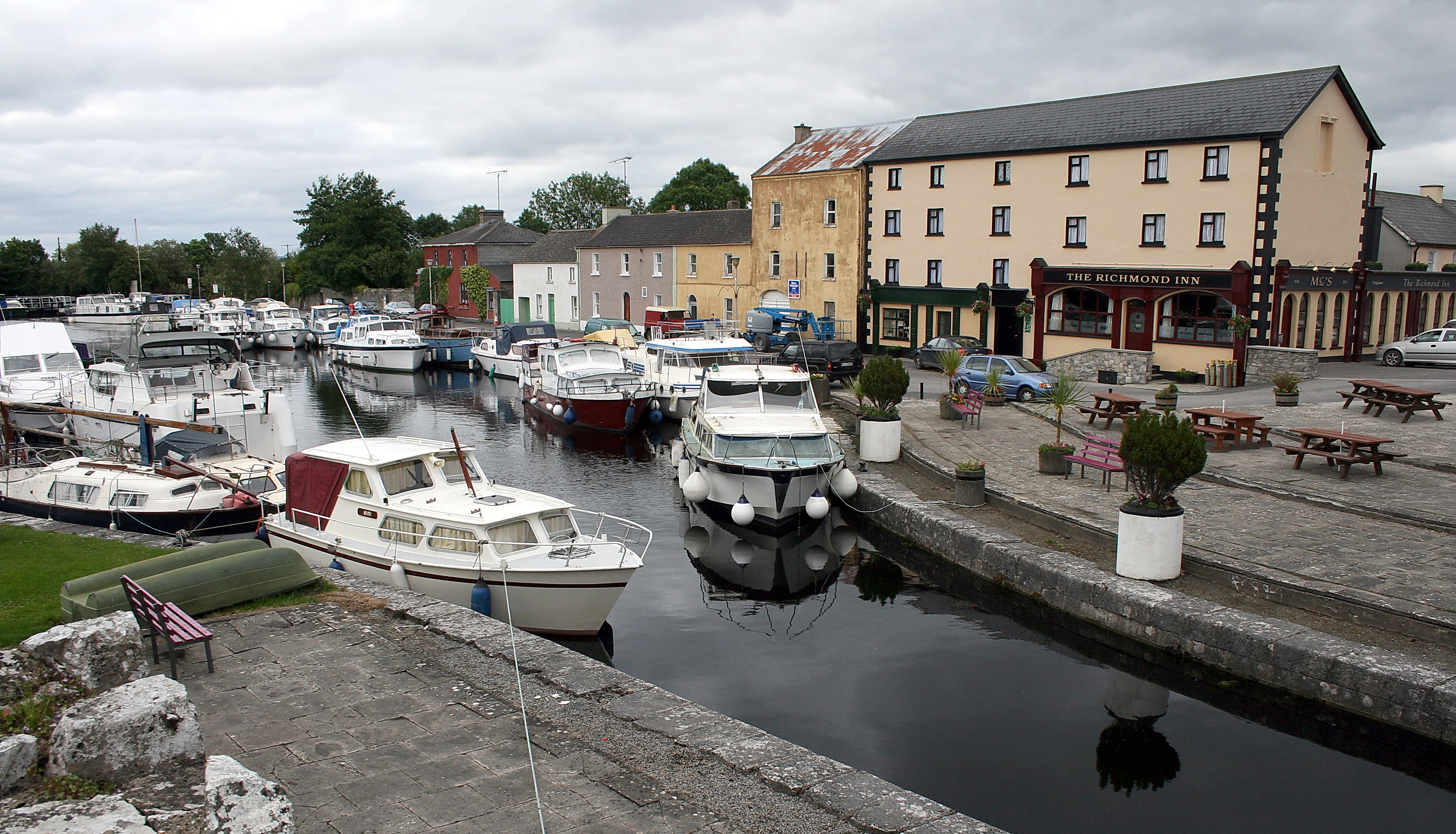
- Cloondara Harbour on the Royal Canal

- Location in Ireland
- Coordinates: 53°44′00″N 7°54′30″W
- Country: Ireland
- Province: Leinster
- County: County Longford
- Time zone: UTC+0 (WET)
  - Summer (DST): UTC-1 (IST (WEST))
- Irish Grid Reference: N 061 760

Cloondara (Irish: Cluain Dá Ráth, meaning 'pasture of two ringforts') is a small village in County Longford, Ireland. It is situated just off the N5 road near Termonbarry, where the Royal Canal terminates at the River Shannon. It lies 7 km (4.3 mi) west of Longford Town. The Royal Canal is being upgraded so that canal boats can once again travel along it. The village of Termonbarry lies to the west of the village, on the opposite bank of the River Shannon.

The Royal Canal reached Cloondara in 1817, the project having been started in 1790. The addition of a canal spur to reach Longford town came after this date, finishing in 1831.

== See also ==
- List of towns and villages in Ireland

== Sources ==
- Clarke, Peter (17 February 1993). "The Royal Canal 1789-1993". Dublin Historical Record. 46 (1). Dublin: Old Dublin Society: 46–52. JSTOR 30101021.
