= EV2 The Capitals Route =

European cycling route

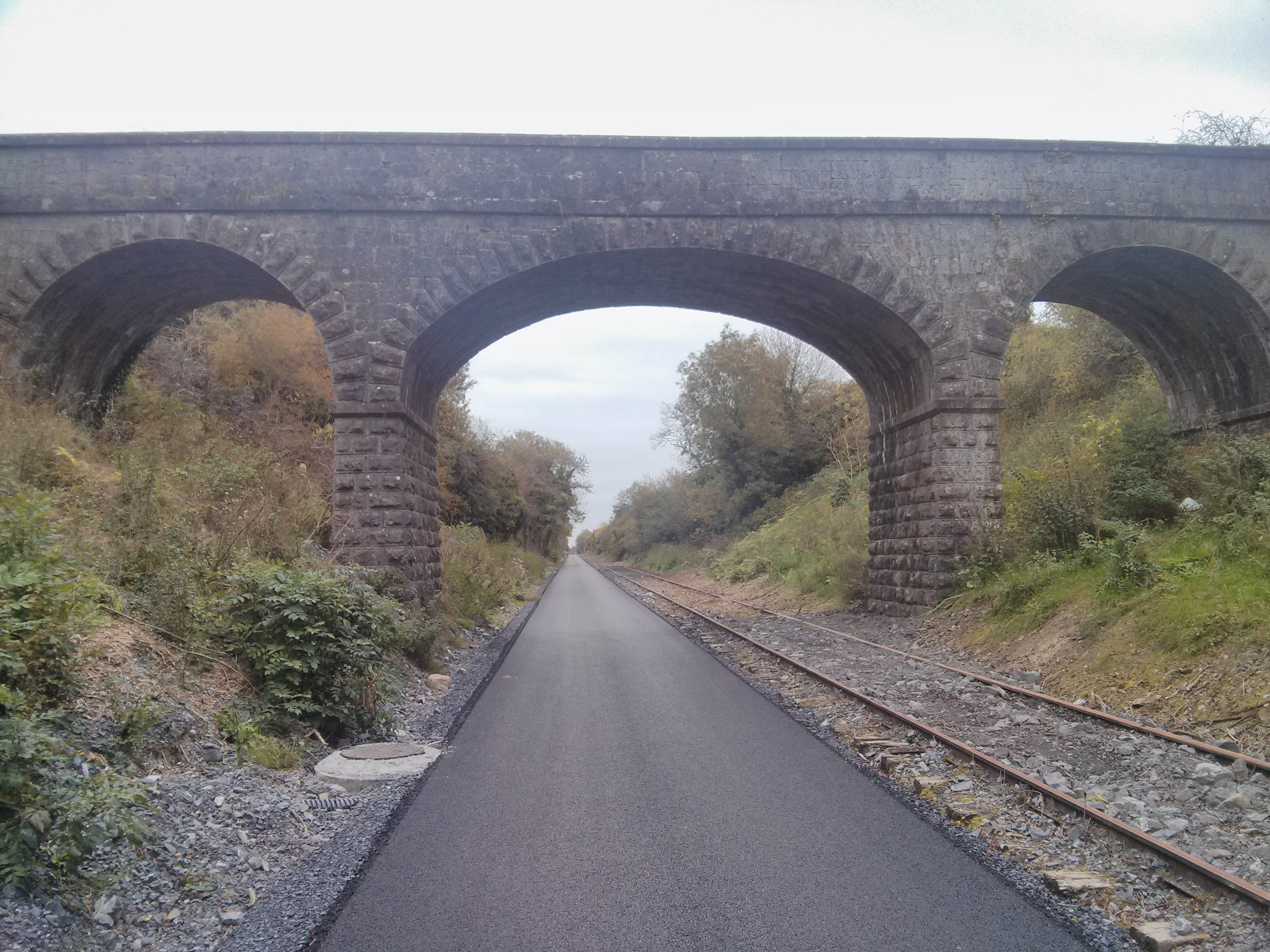
- A bridge crossing the Dublin–Galway Greenway near Athlone, Ireland
- Length: 5,050 km (3,140 mi)
- Designation: European Cyclists' Federation
- Trailheads: Galway, Ireland to Moscow, Russia
- Use: cycling
- Website: https://en.eurovelo.com/ev2

Trail map
- Map of the EuroVelo 2 route

EuroVelo 2 (EV2), named The Capitals Route, is a 5,050 km (3,140 mi) long EuroVelo long-distance cycling route running from Galway, Ireland to Moscow, Russia. This east-west route passes successively through seven countries – Republic of Ireland, the United Kingdom, the Netherlands, Germany, Poland, Belarus and Russia – and visits all their capital cities.

== Route ==
=== Ireland ===
The route is known as the Dublin-Galway Greenway, and is yet to be finalised.

The western section of EV2 between Galway and Dublin was scheduled to commence construction between Athlone and Mullingar in 2014, and completed in 2015, along a disused railway line. Portions of the Royal Canal bank between Mullingar and the Westmeath – Meath county boundary have been completed. The section from the county boundary – Dublin section closed public consultation in February 2016 The initial design of the westernmost section through Galway and Roscommon has been rejected as substandard and must be redesigned.

Note that there is some controversy over the design standard in Ireland overall.

=== U.K ===
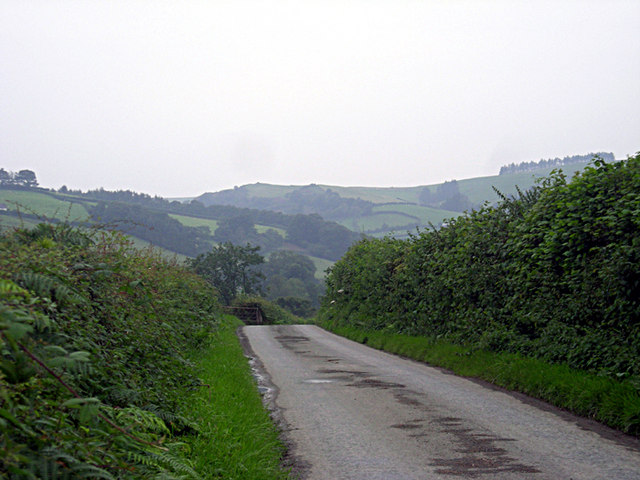
The EV2 in Powys, Wales

In the U.K, the EV2 starts at Holyhead on the Isle of Anglesey and travels through the heart of Wales along the National Cycle Network's NCR8 Lôn Las Cymru, taking in Snowdonia National Park and Brecon Beacons National Park. It passes through the Welsh capital of Cardiff before crossing the Severn, where it visits the cities of Bristol and Bath – connected by the Bristol and Bath Railway Path.

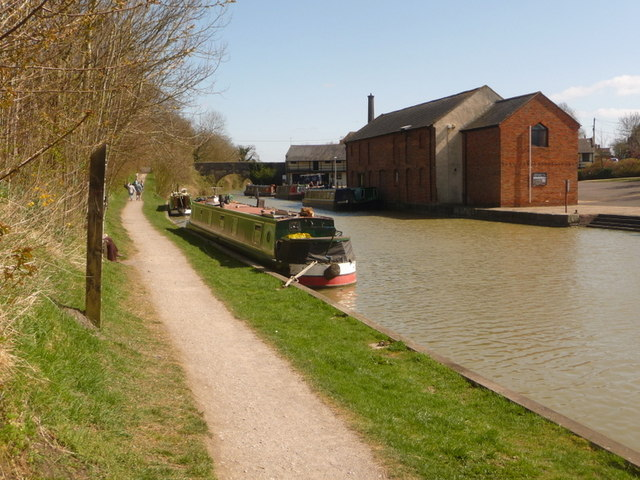
The EV2 along the Kennet and Avon Canal at Devizes, Wiltshire

After that it joins the Kennet and Avon Cycle Route (NCR4) along the canal which links the Thames and the Bristol Channel, weaving through scenery on its way from Bath to Reading. At Reading, the route joins the Thames Path cycle route on its way to London. Finally it leaves London through the docklands, travelling north to the ferry port at Harwich.

=== Netherlands ===
In the Netherlands, the EV2 follows the Dutch National Cycle Routes LF4 and LF8. From The Hague it follows the LF4 to Borculo and then the LF8 to Zwillbrock on the German border.

=== Germany ===
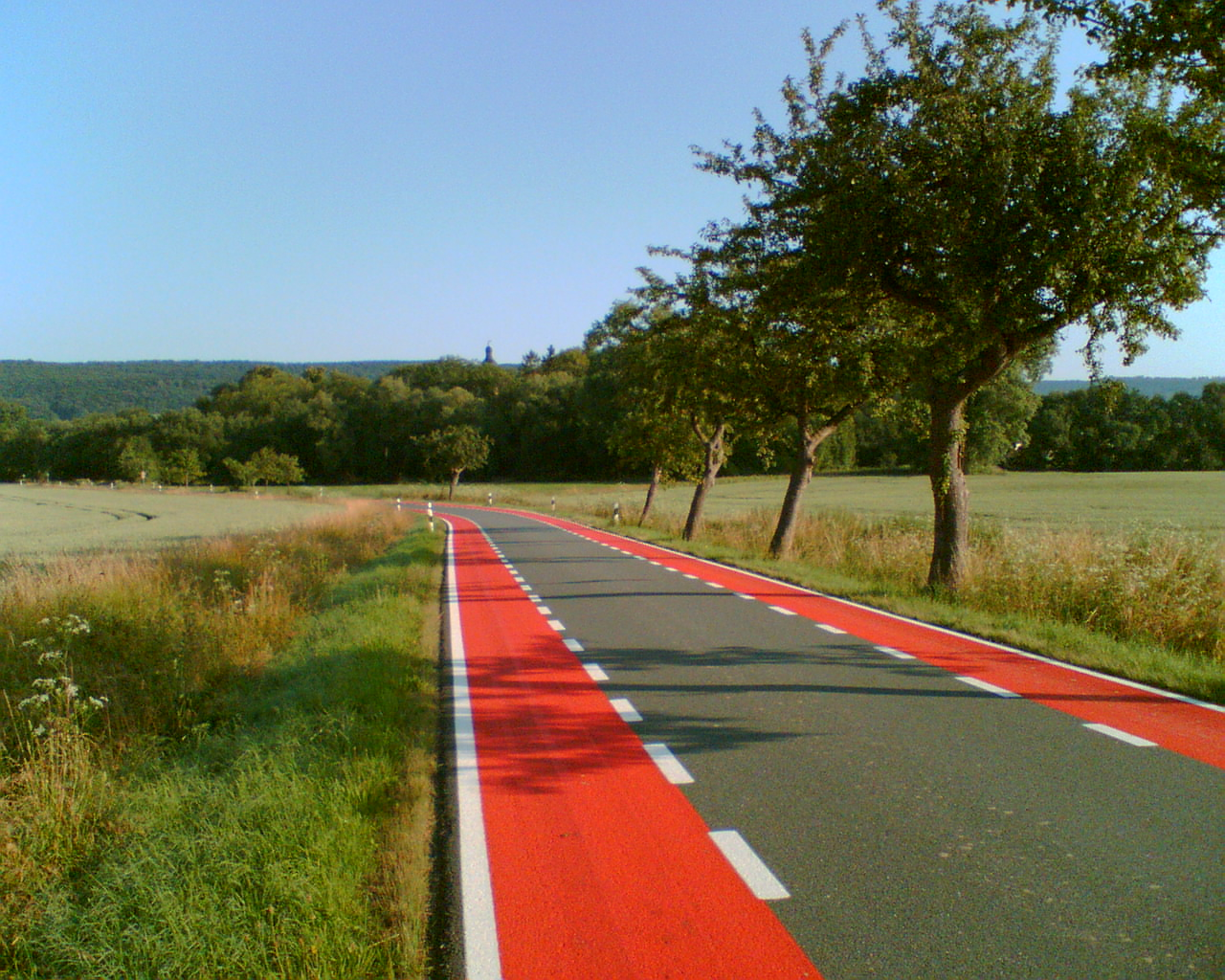
EV2 in Lower Saxony, Germany

In Germany, the EV2 follows the German Cycling Network's D-Route 3, which runs 960 km (600 mi) from the Dutch border at Vreden to the Polish one at Küstrin-Kietz.

=== Poland ===
In Poland, the EV2 exists from the German border to Poznań. The rest is currently in development.

=== Belarus ===
In Belarus, the route passes through the Białowieża Forest, one of the last primeval forest in Europe, as well as the capital Minsk.

=== Russia ===
In Russia, the EV2 is in the planning stages and will pass through Smolensk on its way to Moscow.
