= Leixlip Spa =

Spring on the banks of the Rye Water in County Kildare, Ireland

- Spá Léim an Bhradáin
- Leixlip Spa in December 2011
- Interactive map of Leixlip Spa
- 53.371855°N 6.505840°W
- Location: Leixlip, Ireland

Site notes
- Discovered: 1793

The Leixlip Spa (Irish: Spá Léim an Bhradáin) (also known as Louisa Bridge Spa) is an archaeological and hydrogeological complex at Louisa Bridge, Leixlip, near Dublin, Ireland, situated close to the Royal Canal. It was a popular health spa in the late 18th and early 19th century. The site is known to contain a warm mineralised spring and a cold spring originating from different sources. The archaeological structures comprise a hexagonal spring well and a Romanesque bath. The warm spring was uncovered in 1794 during the construction of the Royal Canal. The mineral spring, marsh and seepage areas at Louisa Bridge are included in the Rye Water Valley / Carton Special Area of Conservation.

== History ==
=== Background ===
The Royal Canal was conceived by a member of the board of the Grand Canal company, and designed to compete with that canal. The Royal Canal was to be 175.4 kilometres long (it ended up being 144.8 kilometers in length). Construction began in 1790.

When plans for the Royal Canal were being devised in the mid-18th century, William FitzGerald, 2nd Duke of Leinster, a shareholder of the Royal Canal scheme, may have insisted that the canal be re-routed south of Maynooth (where he had an estate at Carton House) rather than the initially planned route north of Maynooth (according to Caesar Otway. However, other reasons for the change in route are mentioned by Delaney including that the northern route would involve an additional lock, that this route would not serve Maynooth and that the estimates in cost were similar for both routes. The estimates would prove to have been grievously miscalculated. This route would require the creation of an aqueduct crossing the Rye Water (also known as the Rye River). The selection of this route led to the discovery of the springs at Leixlip Spa.

The area around Leixlip where the spa was built saw one of the most expensive civil engineering tasks ever undertaken in Ireland as the canal (built alongside the newly discovered spa) had to cross the Rye Water valley, 26 metres (85 ft) below the level of the canal. The engineering effort took 6 years to complete. The aqueduct was claimed, at the time, to be the tallest in the world at 100 feet high.

Construction of the Rye Water aqueduct commenced in 1790-1 and was fraught with difficulties, both technical and financial.

=== Construction ===
The spring was discovered in 1793 while digging was being carried out at this section of the Royal Canal. The water from the spring was diverted to a hexagonal basin beside the canal. A bucket was added to the construction so that visitors could draw a bucket of spring water from the canal tow path without descending from their carriages. A channel was constructed from the basin to an elongated oval stone well chamber with steps descending to the interior at either end. This was known as the Roman Bath or Romanesque Bath. This construction was approximately 0.7 m deep. Water entered the Bath from a single point at one end. The Bath gave views of the Rye Water waterfall (canal overflow) and aqueduct 100 feet below it at the time. Between the Roman Bath and the River Rye are a series of terraces, down which seepage from the springs flows.

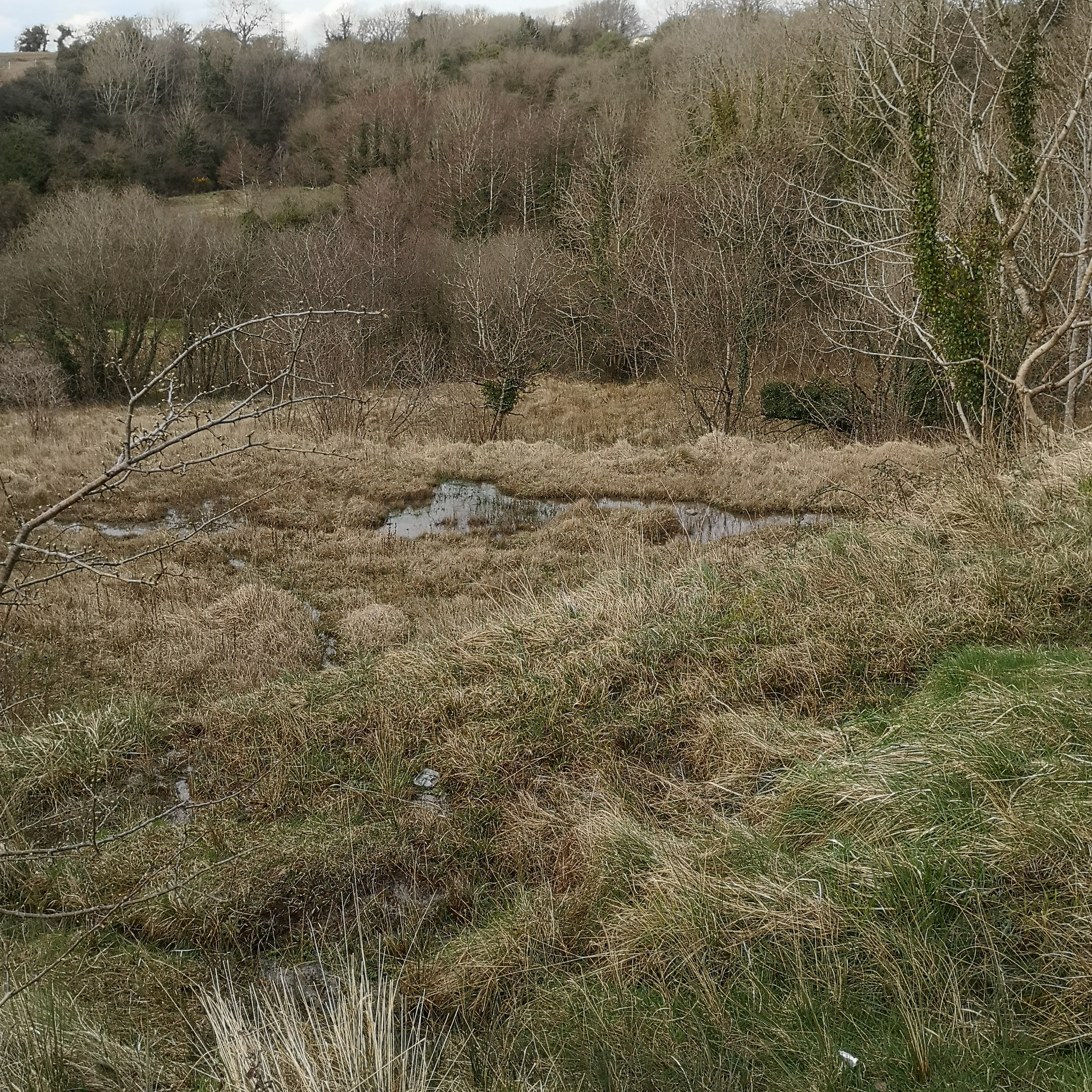
View from the Roman Bath at Leixlip Spa down to the River Rye

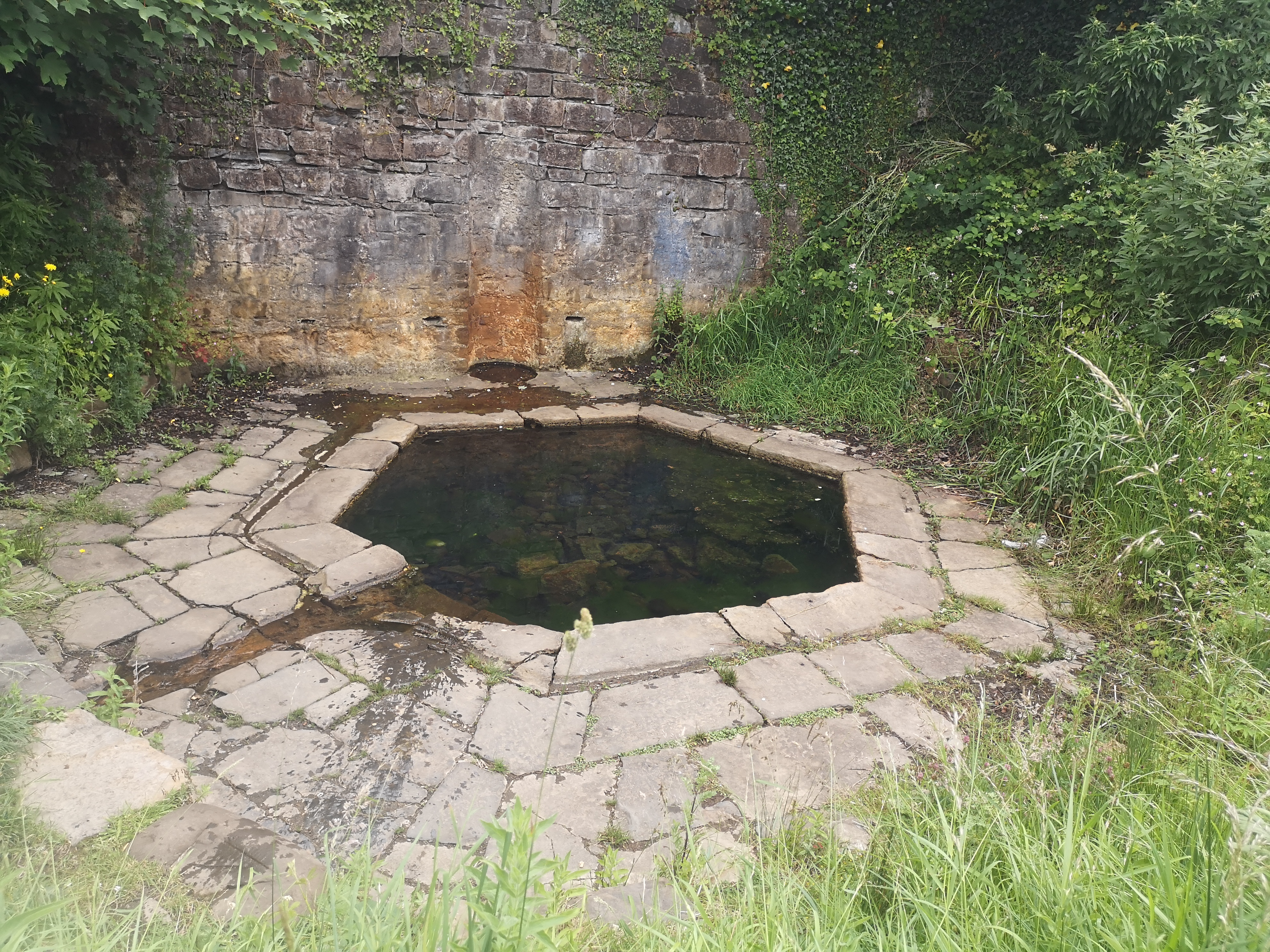
The hexagonal basin at the Leixlip Spa

William Conolly, who acquired Leixlip Castle in 1732, planned to develop the spa into a classical thermal spa, but to no avail

=== Operation ===
The spring was used as a health spa for at least 20 years. Thomas James Rawson, in his Statistical Survey of the County of Kildare of 1807 described it thus:

...near which a spa of invaluable quality has been discovered, and having already cured many persons of cutaneous, and other various violent disorders, will prove of public utility; it has been analized by the celebrated chymist, Mr. Higgins, having found it so efficacious.

Caesar Otway in 1839 described this spa as "one of the most beautiful and abundant in Ireland" and noted that as the spring was discovered in winter, its warmth was apparent compared to other springs. Otway says that the spring is reputed to contain a red worm which may be used to cure a sore leg, and that drinking a quart or two of this water is known to cure "whiskey fever" - he himself had witnessed this cure In the Anthologica Hibernica of 1794, an observer estimated that approximately 12,000 persons who made their way towards the Spa on one Sunday alone between 6 am and 5 pm.

A caricature of the Leixlip Spa and its attendant crowds is held in the Robinson Collection of Caricatures at Trinity College Dublin.

The popularity of the Louisa Bridge Spa waned later on, and it is noted that after 1820 people just stopped visiting.

The Conservation Management Plan for the Leixlip Spa, commissioned by the Heritage Council (Ireland), notes that there are no other examples of such a thermal Bath architectural construction in Ireland.

=== 20th century ===
The spa remained neglected for many years, until 1972 when An Foras Forbartha (who were later absorbed into the Environmental Protection Agency (Ireland)) reported the area as being of scientific interest. In 1974 the Royal Canal Amenities Group was formed to restore the Canal and surrounding areas. In 1975 the Kildare Branch of An Taisce did restoration work on the Leixlip Spa and there has been much restoration and maintenance work done by several local groups since then - a full timeline history of the development of the Leixlip Spa is included in the 2009/10 Conservation Plan for the Spa.

To preserve the spa, a committee was set up from members of Leixlip Town Council, Kildare County Council, An Taisce, Duchas and the Irish National History Museum.

The Louisa Bridge Spa lies along the Great Famine Heritage Trail and a sculpture of a pair of bronze shoes is located close to the Leixlip Spa, commemorating the travel of Strokestown's Famine Emigrants from Roscommon to Dublin.

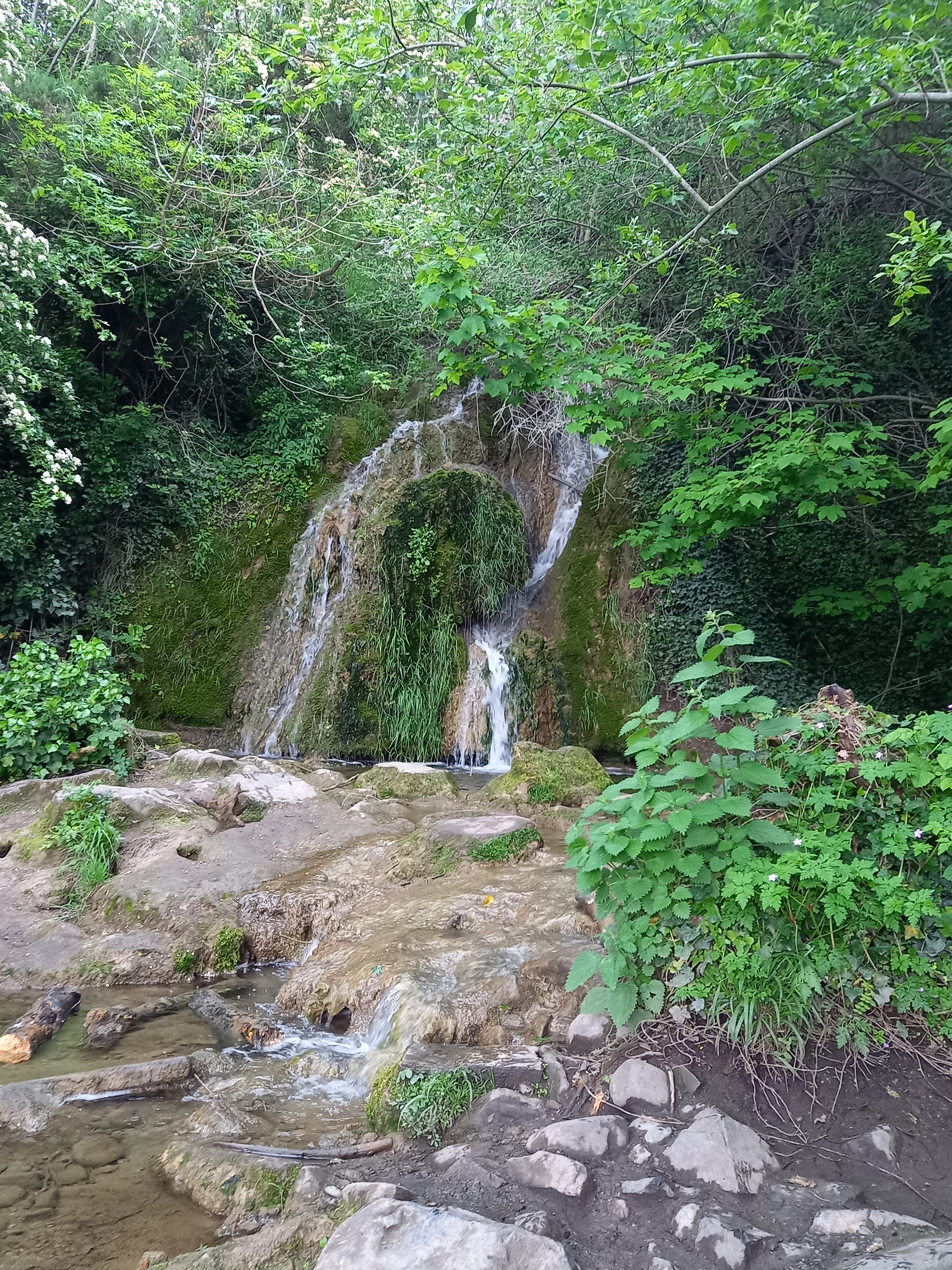
Waterfall near Leixlip Spa

== Folklore ==
A document from the Manuscript Collection of Ireland at Dúchas (Irish Folklore Commission) describes folklore information collected in 1938 about the Spa – known as the Iron Spa or the Iron Well. Here the Spa is described as having the cure for eye problems and chilblains. A small worm was thought to live in the waters, and this would be placed between two pieces of cloth and held to the eyes to cure 'weak eyes'. It is noted that some people left the pieces of cloth on the nearby briars, however, more did not as there was no saint associated with this well. There were two other wells in Leixlip associated with saints: St Catherine's Well and St Columcille's Well.

== Ecology ==
The Louisa Bridge Spring and Roman Bath is situated in the Rye Water Valley/Carton Special Area of Conservation (Site code: 001398). The site achieved Special Area of Conservation status in 2018.

One of the qualifying features of this area for SAC status is the presence of the Habitats Directive Annex I priority habitat as 'petrifying springs with tufa formation (cratoneurion)' (the other qualifications are the presence of the Narrow-mouthed Whorl Snail (Vertigo angustior) and Desmoulin's Whorl Snail (Vertigo moulinsiana). The European Environment Agency notes that the Kingfisher (Alcedo atthis), a species protected by the EU Birds Directive, occurs at this site.

The seepage of the springs of the Leixlip Spa flows down the terraces at the site to the River Rye, providing an interesting ecosystem, as described in the National Parks and Wildlife Service (Ireland) Site Synopsis:

"The marsh, mineral spring and seepage area found at Louisa Bridge supports a good diversity of plant species, including stoneworts, Marsh Arrowgrass (Triglochin palustris), Purple Moor-grass (Molinia caerulea), sedges (Carex spp.), Common Butterwort (Pinguicula vulgaris), Marsh Lousewort (Pedicularis palustris), Grass-of-parnassus (Parnassia palustris) and Cuckooflower (Cardamine pratensis). The mineral spring found at the site is of a type considered to be rare in Europe and is a habitat listed on Annex I of the E.U. Habitats Directive. The Red Data Book species Blue Fleabane (Erigeron acer) is found growing on a wall at Louisa Bridge."

In this Special Area of Conservation, the site surveyed by the National Parks and Wildlife Service (Ireland) was found to contain a complex of tufa-forming springs, flushes and pools as well as paludal tufa, oncoids/ooids and marl.

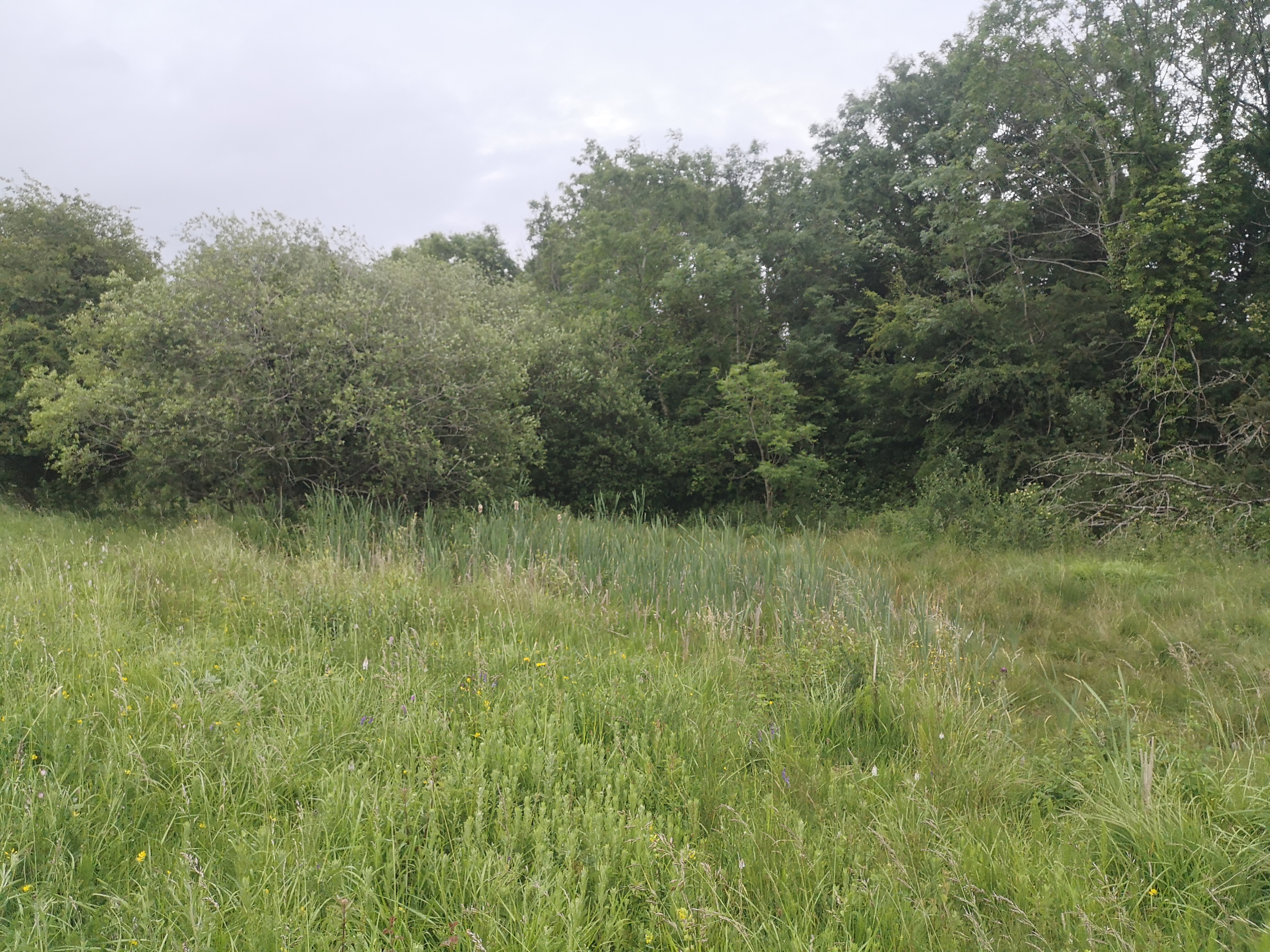
The wetland area between the hexagonal basin and the Roman Bath at Leixlip Spa

The Revised Conservation Plan for the Spa (2009/10) notes that the habitats, flora and fauna of this site give it international scientific significance, and that it is one of the most important examples of the Annex I Priority Habitat Petrifying Springs with Tufa Formation.

"The petrifying springs at Leixlip Spa give rise to a mosaic of wetland habitats of immense significance for the rarity, fragility and species-richness of the flora and fauna they support, creating a unique and irreplaceable natural resource. The ecological and hydrological aspects of this site must be considered to be of the utmost importance and must be afforded the greatest priority for conservation"

== Hydrogeology ==
Of the two known springs at the Leixlip Spa complex, the warm spring is believed to be derived from Carboniferous Limestone bedrock at depth while the cold spring is thought to be derived from shallow bedrock or Quaternary deposits.

Temperatures in the cold spring range between 6-14 degrees C. Monitoring work by Blake showed the maximum temperature at the Spring was 17.5 °C. The electrical conductivity of the waters at Louisa Bridge Spa Well was recorded as one of the highest measured in thermal wells in Ireland, at 1644 μS/cm. The pH range is 6.95-7.77.

The work by Blake noted that the Irish thermal springs are found in Carboniferous limestone bedrock along a lineament running from North East to South West Ireland, broadly along the line of the Iapetus Suture Zone. Blake also noted that this spring has a residence time in excess of 30,000 years, suggesting the waters are a mixture of groundwaters from different recharge areas and sources.

== Other ==
From an Inland Waterways Association of Ireland (IWAI) newsletter of 2003, a cleanup of the spa was described. The authors suggest then that it was at that point the responsibility of the Kildare County Council and Leixlip Town Council to continue with the work to restore the spa which is part of Ireland's National Heritage and an important feature in the Kildare area. The clean-up of the Leixlip Spa was described on Irish television (RTÉ or Raidió Teilifís Éireann) in 1975.
