= Rye Water Valley / Carton =

Ecological site in County Kildare, Ireland

- Gleann an Rí/Cartún
- Location within Ireland
- Location: County Kildare, Ireland
- Nearest city: Leixlip
- Coordinates: 53°22′20″N 6°30′20″W
- Established: 1997
- Governing body: National Parks and Wildlife Service

The Rye Water Valley/Carton (Irish: Gleann an Rí/Cartún) Special Area of Conservation or SAC is a Natura 2000 site based along the Rye Water / River Rye in north County Kildare, Ireland. It is protected as an SAC since November 2018 due to the presence of a rare hydrogeological habitat (thermal, mineral petrifying spring associated with a calcareous marsh) at a site close to the River Rye, and the presence of protected species (the narrow-mouthed whorl snail Vertigo angustior, Desmoulin's snail Vertigo moulinsiana, and the Eurasian kingfisher Alcedo atthis).

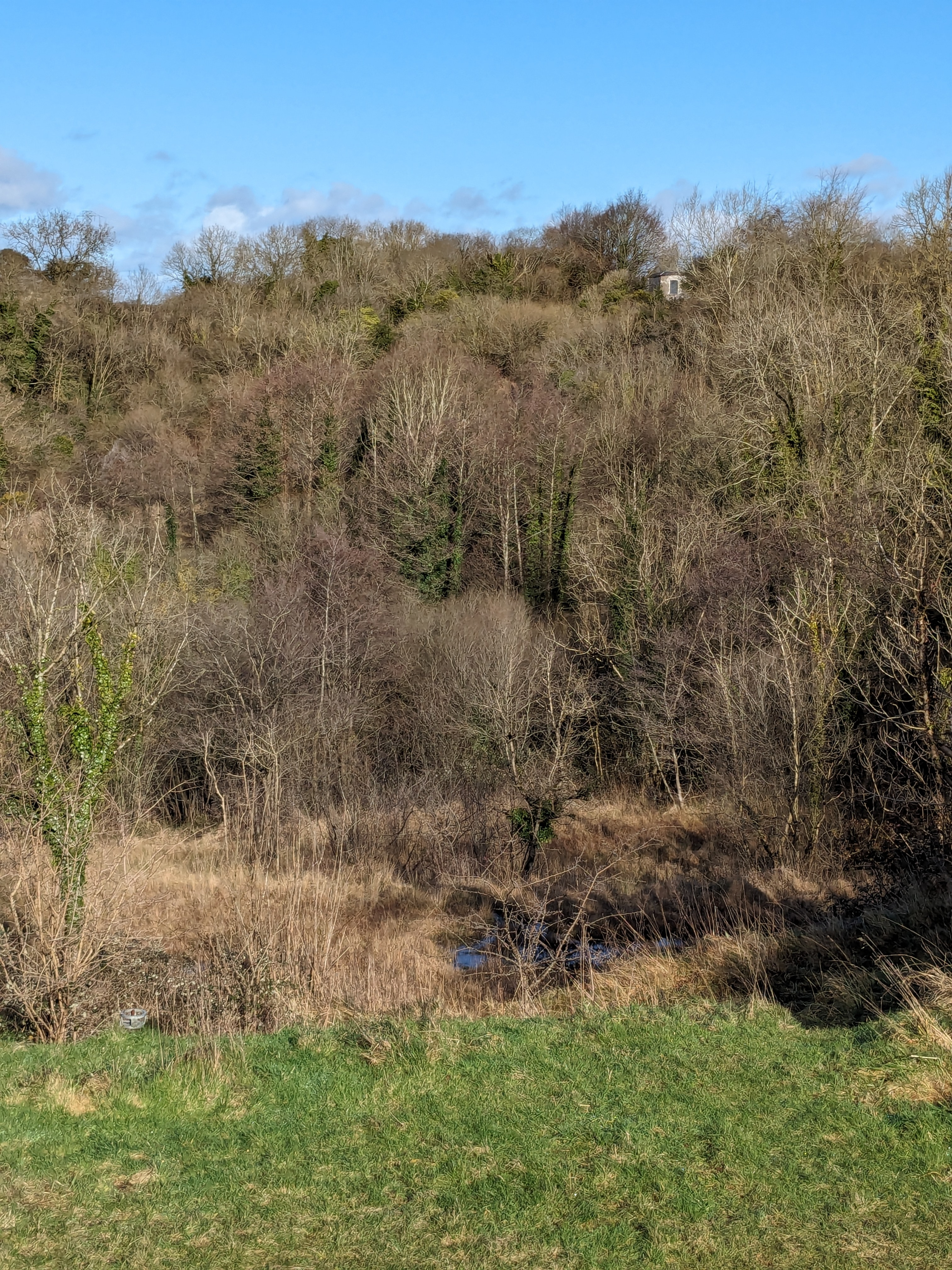
Terraces leading down to the River Rye at Louisa Bridge

== Location ==
The Rye Water Valley/Carton SAC is primarily located between Maynooth and Leixlip in north County Kildare, and including a part of the site in County Meath. As per the Statutory instrument establishing the site, it is situated in whole or in part in the townlands of Blakestown (E.D. Maynooth), Carton Demesne, Confey, Kellystown, Leixlip and Leixlip Demesne in County Kildare and Moygaddy in County Meath.

== SAC qualification ==
The Rye Water Valley/Carton site was designated a Natura 2000 site in 1997 under the Habitats Directive. The Statutory Instrument establishing this site as an SAC (Site code: 001398) was passed in 2018. One of the features which qualifies this site for SAC status is the presence of the Habitats Directive Annex I priority habitat as 'petrifying springs with tufa formation (cratoneurion)': Natura 2000 code 7220. Other qualifications include the presence of the narrow-mouthed whorl snail (Vertigo angustior) and Desmoulin's whorl snail (Vertigo moulinsiana). The European Environment Agency notes that the kingfisher (Alcedo atthis), a bird species which is covered by the EU Birds Directive, occurs at the Rye Water Valley site.

The National Parks and Wildlife Service (NPWS) has included the Rye Water Valley/Carton site as a proposed Natural Heritage Area or pNHA. Adjacent to this site, the Royal Canal (site code 002103) and Liffey Valley (site code 000128) sites have also been proposed as pNHAs.

== Features ==
The National Parks and Wildlife Service website outlines the site synopsis, including relevant species. The SAC includes a series of dammed lakes along the river at the Carton House Estate. The flora at this site in the SAC includes uncommon plants such as the hairy St. John's-wort (Hypericum hirsutum), and hairy violet (Viola hirta, both protected under the Flora (Protection) Order, 1999), as well as the Red Data Book species green figwort (Scrophularia umbrosa). At Louisa Bridge, Leixlip, the warm and cold springs have produced a calcareous marsh wetland above the river and a seepage area which follows down a series of terraced slopes towards the river. This area is also associated with specific flora and fauna:

The marsh, mineral spring and seepage area found at Louisa Bridge supports a good diversity of plant species, including stoneworts, marsh arrowgrass (Triglochin palustris), purple moor-grass (Molinia caerulea), sedges (Carex spp.), common butterwort (Pinguicula vulgaris), marsh lousewort (Pedicularis palustris), grass-of-parnassus (Parnassia palustris), and cuckooflower (Cardamine pratensis). The mineral spring found at the site is of a type considered to be rare in Europe and is a habitat listed on Annex I of the E.U. Habitats Directive. The Red Data Book species blue fleabane (Erigeron acer) is found growing on a wall at Louisa Bridge.

As the Revised Conservation Plan for the Spa (2009/10) states, it is a significant example of the Annex I Priority Habitat: Petrifying Springs with Tufa Formation. The habitats, flora and fauna of this site give it international scientific significance,

"The petrifying springs at Leixlip Spa give rise to a mosaic of wetland habitats of immense significance for the rarity, fragility and species-richness of the flora and fauna they support, creating a unique and irreplaceable natural resource. The ecological and hydrological aspects of this site must be considered to be of the utmost importance and must be afforded the greatest priority for conservation"

=== Hydrogeology ===
There are two known springs at the Leixlip Spa site forming the marsh and seepage area. The warm spring is understood to derive from Carboniferous limestone bedrock at depth The cold spring is believed to derive from shallow bedrock or Quaternary deposits

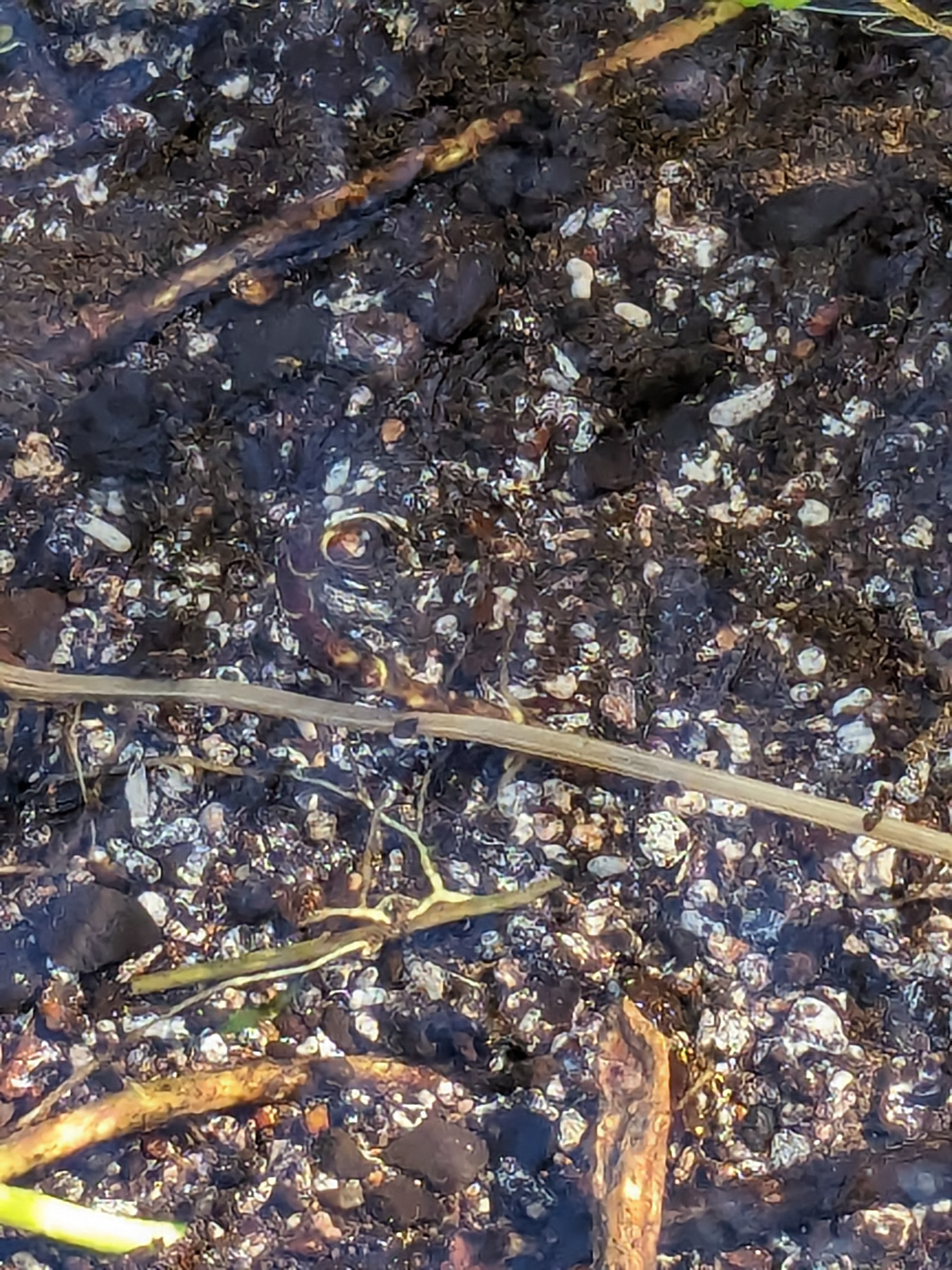
Calcium deposits in the stream at Louisa Bridge springs

In a study on Irish petrifying springs, Lyons (2015) found that mean concentrations of sodium and chloride at the Louisa Bridge tufaceous springs site were 215.24 mg/l and 415.75 mg/l, respectively (and that this was the only site in that investigation of petrifying springs in 18 counties in Ireland in which thermal spring water contributed to tufa formation).

The National Parks and Wildlife Service (Ireland) Site Conservation Objectives document for this SAC describes this petrifying springs habitat as dynamic and notes that it may be significantly affected by any drop in water supply, while there may also be natural reductions in tufa due obstructions of any upwelling springs.

In addition to the thermal springs at this SAC, there are other warm springs in north Kildare and south Meath, including Sunday's Well in Clane, St. Patrick's Well at Ardrass, and St. Peter's Well in Donadea, and there may be further springs along the Rye River SAC.

=== Fauna ===
Within the Rye Water Valley/Carton SAC, the Rye Water / River Rye is a spawning site for trout and salmon.

The 2021 Ryewater Arterial Drainage Scheme Natura Impact Statement, produced and researched by JBA Consulting, lists the protected flora and fauna recorded at this SAC, which include the amphibians common frog (Rana temporaria), and smooth newt (Lissotriton vulgaris).

A wide range of bird species protected under Wildlife Acts as Red or Amber list species have been recorded at this site, including the barn owl (Tyto alba), the barn swallow (Hirundo rustica), kingfisher (Alcedo atthis), common pheasant (Phasianus colchicus), common snipe (Gallinago gallinago), common starling (Sturnus vulgaris), common swift (Apus apus), common wood pigeon (Columba palumbus), Eurasian curlew (Numenius arquata), Eurasian teal (Anas crecca), Eurasian tree sparrow (Passer montanus), Eurasian wigeon (Anas penelope), European golden plover (Pluvialis apricaria), great crested grebe (Podiceps cristatus), greater white-fronted goose (Anser albifrons), house martin (Delichon urbicum), lesser black-backed gull (Larus fuscus), little egret (Egretta garzetta), little grebe (Tachybaptus ruficollis), mallard (Anas platyrhynchos), mute swan (Cygnus olor), peregrine falcon (Falco peregrinus), red grouse (Lagopus lagopus), red kite (Milvus milvus), sand martin (Riparia riparia), sky lark (Alauda arvensis), spotted flycatcher (Muscicapa striata), tufted duck (Aythya fuligula), whooper swan (Cygnus cygnus), and yellowhammer (Emberiza citrinella).

One crustacean species protected under the EU Habitats Directive has been recorded in this SAC, that is, the freshwater white-clawed crayfish (Austropotamobius pallipes). A protected insect species, the marsh fritillary butterfly (Euphydryas aurinia), has also been recorded here.

Several protected terrestrial mammal species occur or have been recorded at the Rye Water Valley SAC, including several bat species (brown long-eared bat (Plecotus auritus), Daubenton's bat (Myotis daubentonii), soprano pipistrelle (Pipistrellus pygmaeus), and lesser noctule (Nyctalus leisleri).

Other protected mammal species occurring at this SAC include the Eurasian badger (Meles meles), Eurasian pygmy shrew (Sorex minutus), Eurasian red squirrel (Sciurus vulgaris), European otter (Lutra lutra), pine marten (Martes martes), red deer (Cervus elaphus), and the west European hedgehog (Erinaceus europaeus).

The keeled skimmer dragonfly Orthetrum coerulescens has been recorded at this site.

=== Flora ===
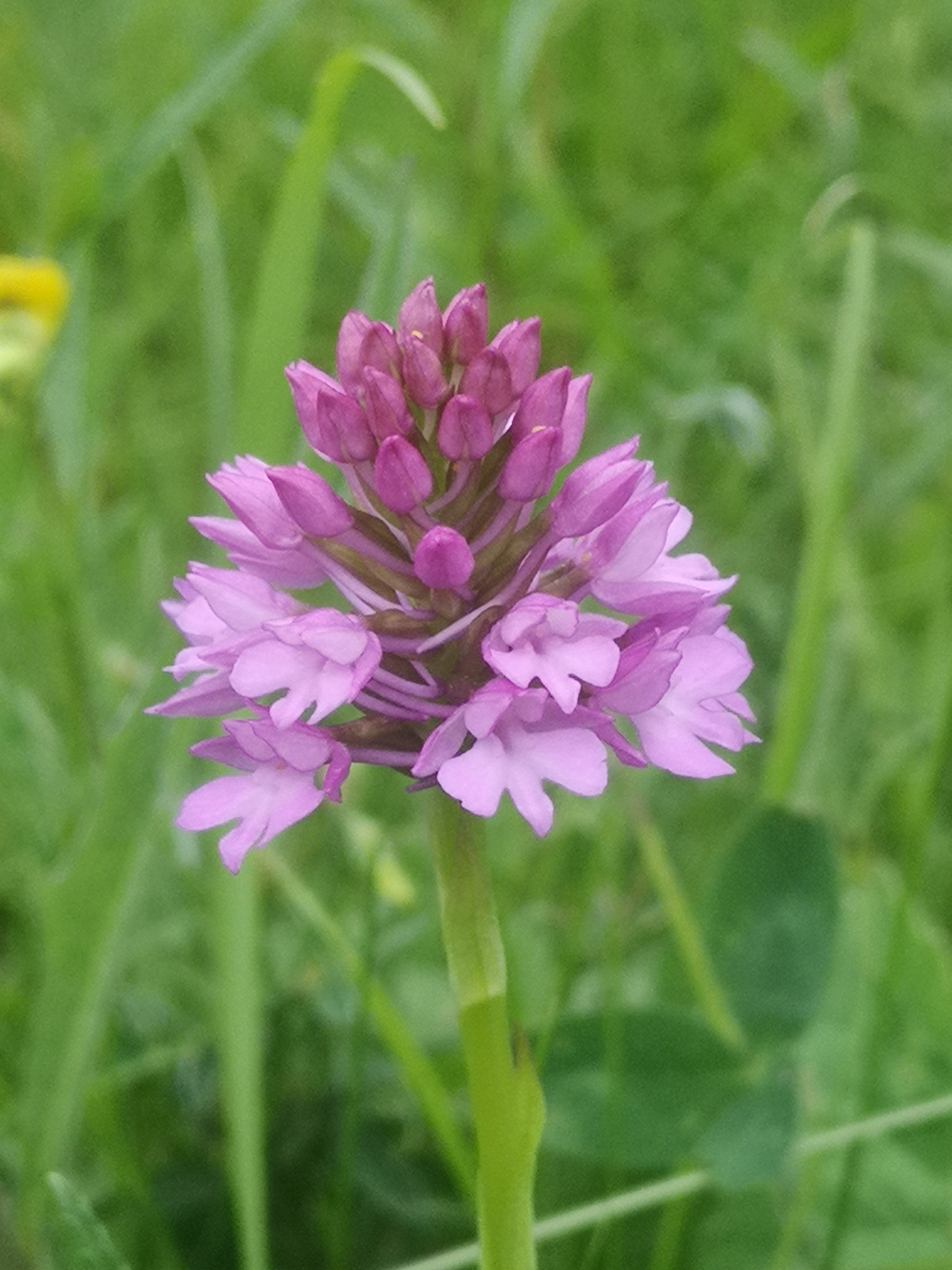
Pyraminal Orchid at the Leixlip Spa 2

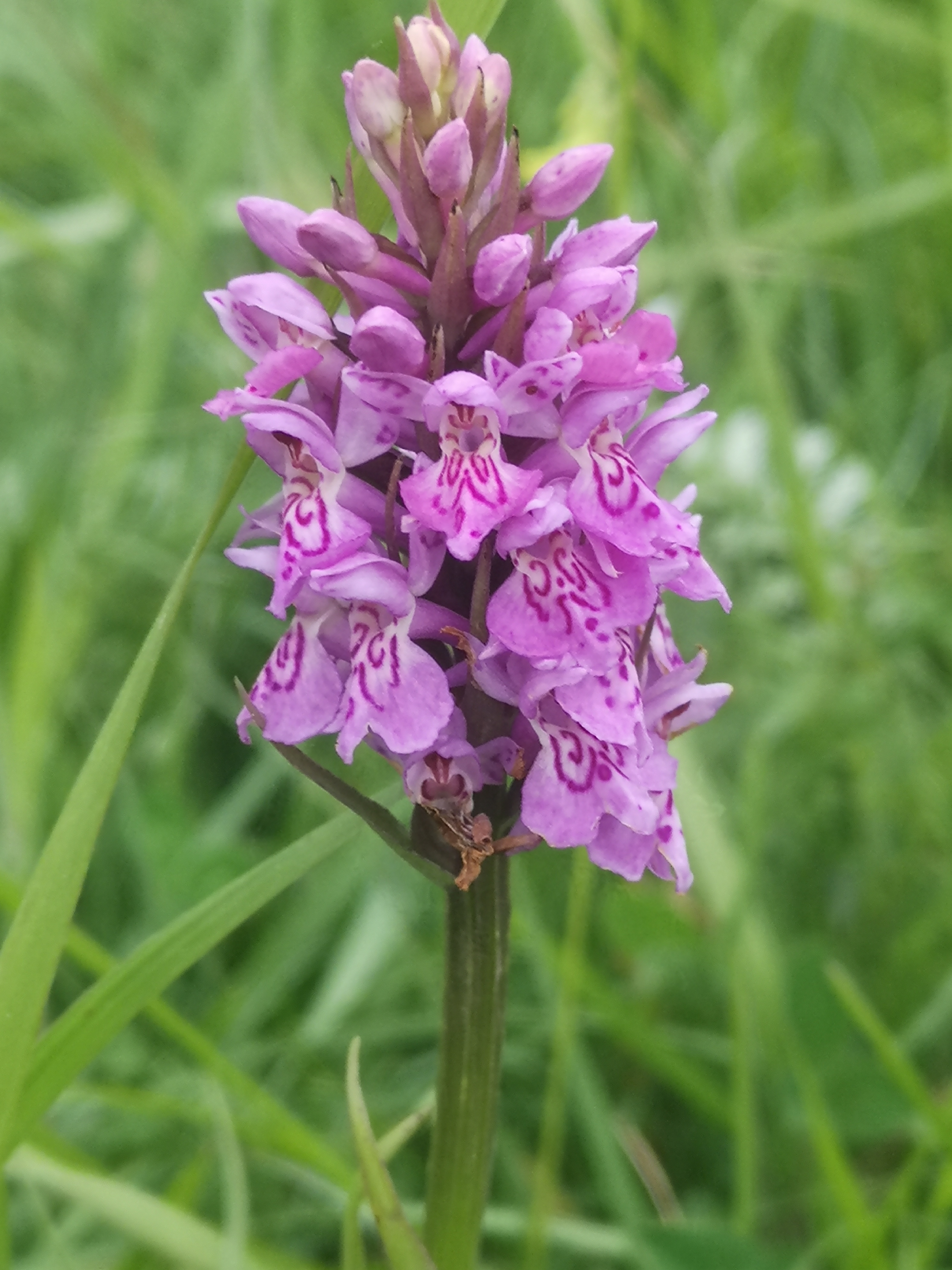
Early Marsh Orchid at the Leixlip Spa 1

As noted in the NPWS Site Synopsis, a wide range of plant species occur along this SAC. At the demesne of Carton House, the river has been dammed, and here reed sweet-grass (Glyceria maxima) and reed canary-grass (Phalaris arundinacea) have been recorded, as well as bulrush (Typha latifolia), marsh-marigold (Caltha palustris), yellow iris (Iris pseudacorus), water forget-me-not (Myosotis scorpioides), and various starworts (Callitriche spp.).

Trees recorded on the Carton House estate include willowa (Salix spp.), alder (Alnus glutinosa), ash (Fraxinus excelsior), beech (Fagus sylvatica, dogwoods (Cornus spp.), elder (Sambucus nigra), hazel (Corylus avellana), oaks (Quercus spp.), sycamore (Acer pseudoplatanus), and yew (Taxus baccata).

Other plants recorded at the site include bittersweet (Solanum dulcamara), common dog-violet (Viola riviniana), common valerian (Valeriana officinalis), golden saxifrage (Chrysosplenium oppositifolium), ground-ivy (Glechoma hederacea), hedge woundwort (Stachys sylvatica), ivy (Hedera helix), ivy broomrape (Orobanche hederae), meadowsweet (Filipendula ulmaria), ramsons (Allium ursinum), wavy bitter-cress (Cardamine flexuosa), wood speedwell (Veronica montana), woodruff (Galium odoratum), wood avens (Geum urbanum), and wild angelica (Angelica sylvestris).

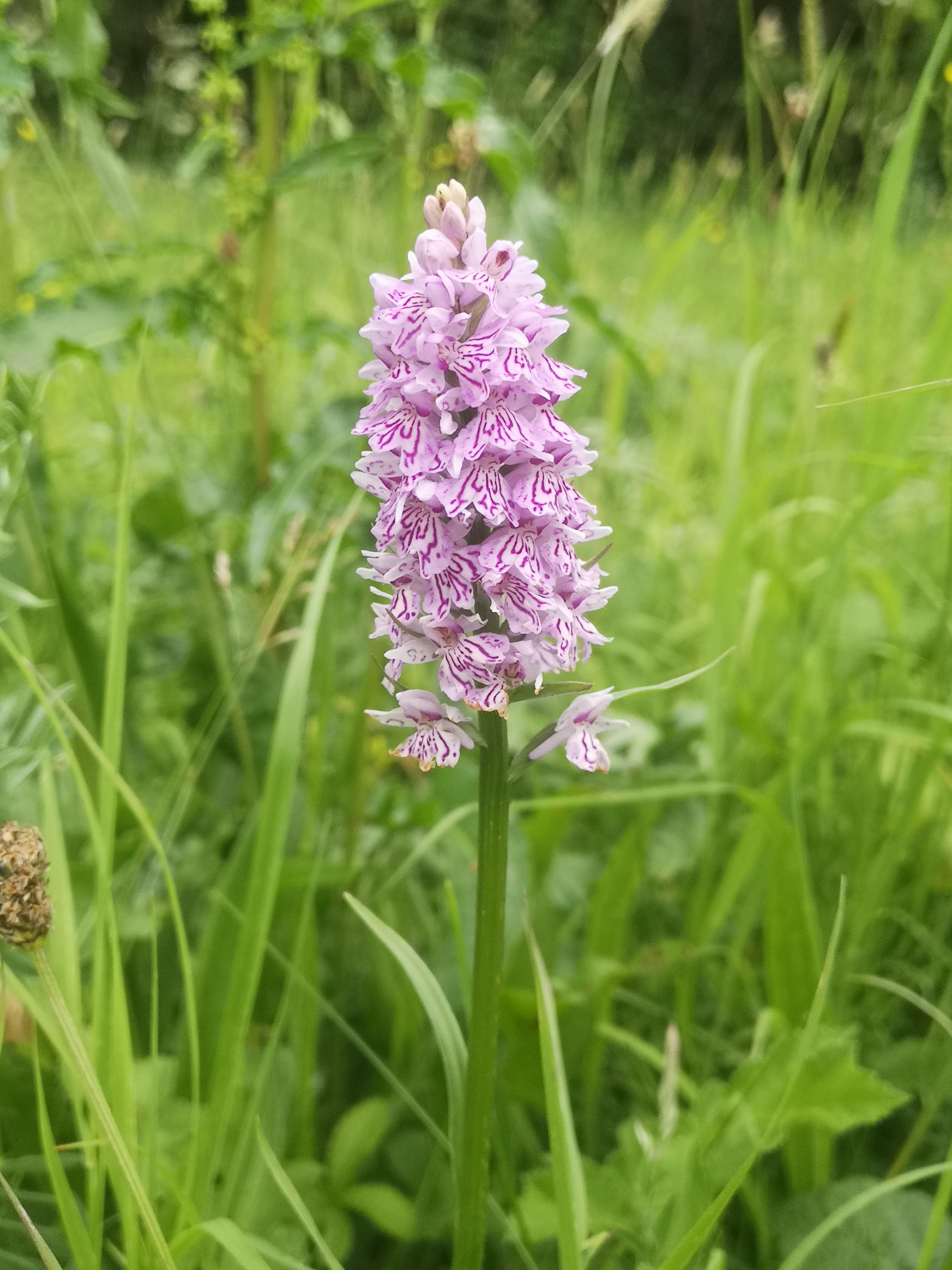
Orchid at the Leixlip Spa

The Louisa Bridge side of the habitat, including the tufaceous springs, marshy area and wetland terraces, includes plants such as common butterwort (Pinguicula vulgaris), cuckooflower (Cardamine pratensis), grass-of-parnassus (Parnassia palustris), marsh lousewort (Pedicularis palustris), marsh arrowgrass (Triglochin palustris), purple moor-grass (Molinia caerulea), sedges (Carex spp.), and various stoneworts (order Charales).

== Conservation ==
The Rye Water/Carton SAC is noted in Chapter 12 (Biodiversity & Green Infrastructure) of the Kildare County Development Plan 2023-2029, as one of eight Natura Sites in County Kildare. The policy of Kildare County Council is to “seek to contribute to maintaining or restoring the conservation status of all sites designated for nature conservation or proposed for designation in accordance with European and national legislation and agreements.”

This site is also noted as one of the 21 proposed NHAs (along with 2 designated NHAs) in County Kildare, and as such it is the policy of Kildare County Council to “ensure that any proposal for development within or adjacent to a Natural Heritage Area (NHA), Ramsar Sites and Nature Reserves is designed and sited to minimise its impact on the biodiversity, ecological, geological and landscape value of the site, particularly plant and animal species listed under the Wildlife Acts and the Habitats and Birds Directive including their habitats.” The objectives of the Council regard proposed NHAs as equivalent to NHAs.

According to the NPWS Conservation Objectives document of 2021, the primary conservation objective is to restore the favourable conservation condition of the petrifying springs with tufa formation (Cratoneurion) habitat, and that of the narrow-mouthed whorl snail (Vertigo angustior), and to maintain the favourable conservation condition of Desmoulin's whorl snail (Vertigo moulinsiana). To restore the petrifying springs habitat, the targets include to ensure the area is stable or increasing, subject to natural processes. A survey carried out in 2015 estimated the size of the petrifying springs habitat as approximately 1,250 m2.

Further conservation objective targets include that the habitat distribution should not suffer decline. The hydrological regimes at the site must be maintained. This habitat requires permanent irrigation, typically from upwelling groundwater sources or seepage sources. The levels of tufa formation should be maintained, requiring adequate seepage rates to the spring and appropriate water quality (including factors such as saturated calcium carbonate, pH, temperature and alkalinity conditions). The variety of the vegetation communities should be maintained, with at least three positive or high quality indicator species, low numbers of negative indicator species and low percentages of algal cover. Indicators of local distinctiveness should be maintained – at this site, these include two species of Vertigo snail (Vertigo angustior and V. moulinsiana).

The favourable conservation condition of narrow-mouthed whorl snail (Vertigo angustior) should be restored to baseline. V. angustior is recorded as occurring at the floodplain habitat at the base of the spring-fed slope along the banks of the Rye Water River and a suitable habitat and hydrological regime should be maintained here. The favourable conservation condition of Desmoulin's whorl snail (Vertigo moulinsiana) should be maintained with respect to distribution, occurrence in suitable habitat (with no less than 0.2ha of at least suboptimal habitat), and density within the habitat.

As well as the three specific features of the SAC described above, the SAC includes the length of the River Rye from outside the town of Maynooth to Leixlip Village. The river Rye is regularly surveyed under the Water Framework Directive, via the Eastern River Basin River Surveys. It is a catch and release fly-fishing river, usually with good stocks of trout. The Leixlip and District Angling Association is in charge of the section of the river in this SAC.

The OPW document ‘River Enhancement Programmes in Ireland for Drained Channels’ by the Office of Public Works notes that extensive enhancement projects were carried out on the river in 1983 with regard to gravel beds for spawning and these beds have been found to be used. However, a riverine enhancement programme carried out in 1993 on the Rye did not result in an increase in adult trout stocks in the river, possibly due to persistent organic pollution problems in the channel .

=== Conservation threats and legal cases ===
In June 2022, a fish kill occurred on the Rye River in the SAC, affecting 2 km of the river. It was estimated that an estimated 500 fish were killed in the incident, primarily trout but including other species. The incident was investigated by Kildare County Council, Inland Fisheries Ireland, Irish Water and the Irish Environmental Protection Agency. The incident resulted in a court case, however this case was withdrawn.

A subsequent pollution event took place shortly after in the river Rye near Carton House outside Maynooth, where diesel was found in the water, however, in this case, no fish were found to be killed.

The 2023 Report of the Technical Expert Group on Salmon to the North-South Standing Scientific Committee for Inland Fisheries notes that fish stocks in the Lower Liffey catchment including the Rye were found to be below the conservation level (conservation level=1705; deficit -1514). In 2023, Inland Fisheries Ireland awarded a sum of €1,300 for the purpose of restoration of spawning in a degraded river channel where the levels of Atlantic salmon had severely declined.

As well as the river itself, the River Rye/Carton SAC also includes wooded areas along the River Rye that are protected under the European Union Habitats (Rye Water Valley/Carton Special Area of Conservation) Regulations 2018. In 2023, a legal case was taken by the National Parks and Wildlife Service over a significant amount of environmental damage done to a 1.2 km stretch of the riparian zone along the river Rye in 2021. This was done in the bird-nesting season and breeding season of the protected species, and would have required a request for Ministerial consent to carry out this work, which was unlikely to have been granted. As well as damage to species in the SAC, there was a risk that nutrients or any chemicals used to manage the lawns of this hotel would wash into the river, as the vegetation barrier was removed. Eleven areas were damaged, and areas outside the SAC were also damaged, which, it was postulated, would have a knock-on effect on the SAC also. Belmullet Hospitality Group Ltd pleaded guilty to two offences (the topping and clearing of rough vegetation and for procuring a contractor to carry out this activity without Ministerial consent under the European Communities (Birds and Natural Habitats) Regulations 2011). They were convicted of both and fined €4,000 for each.

With respect to the SAC, in 2021, Thomas Reid took a challenge against An Bórd Pleanála regarding a proposed expansion of the 160-acre Intel campus at Leixlip, based on the Habitats Directive, Environmental Impact Assessment (EIA) Directive and Seveso-III (Control of Major Accident Hazards Involving Dangerous Substances) Directive. The Intel plant is based alongside, but not included in, the SAC of the river Rye. Thomas Reid’s case included claims that the project would involve a30-acre expansion to Intel’s 160-acre campus, that it would take more than four years to construct, that it would involve two years of rock quarrying to get structures to formation level, and that there was a risk of emissions to the SAC from the plant which may damage the SAC. According to media reports, An Bórd Pleanála stated the development would not adversely affect the integrity of the SAC, and that appropriate assessments had been carried out. The High Court dismissed the action.

== History ==
The SAC also contains an area of ecological, hydrogeological and historical interest called the Leixlip Spa. It contains a Romanesque bath and hexagonal well created in the 1790s after the discovery of warm and cold springs at the site, which were used therapeutically for a time. The springs were discovered during the building of the Royal Canal in 1793. In this SAC, The Rye River flows under the Ryewater Aqueduct, which was constructed in the 1790s during the works to construct the Royal Canal. At the time, it was said to have been the tallest aqueduct in the world, at 100 feet high.

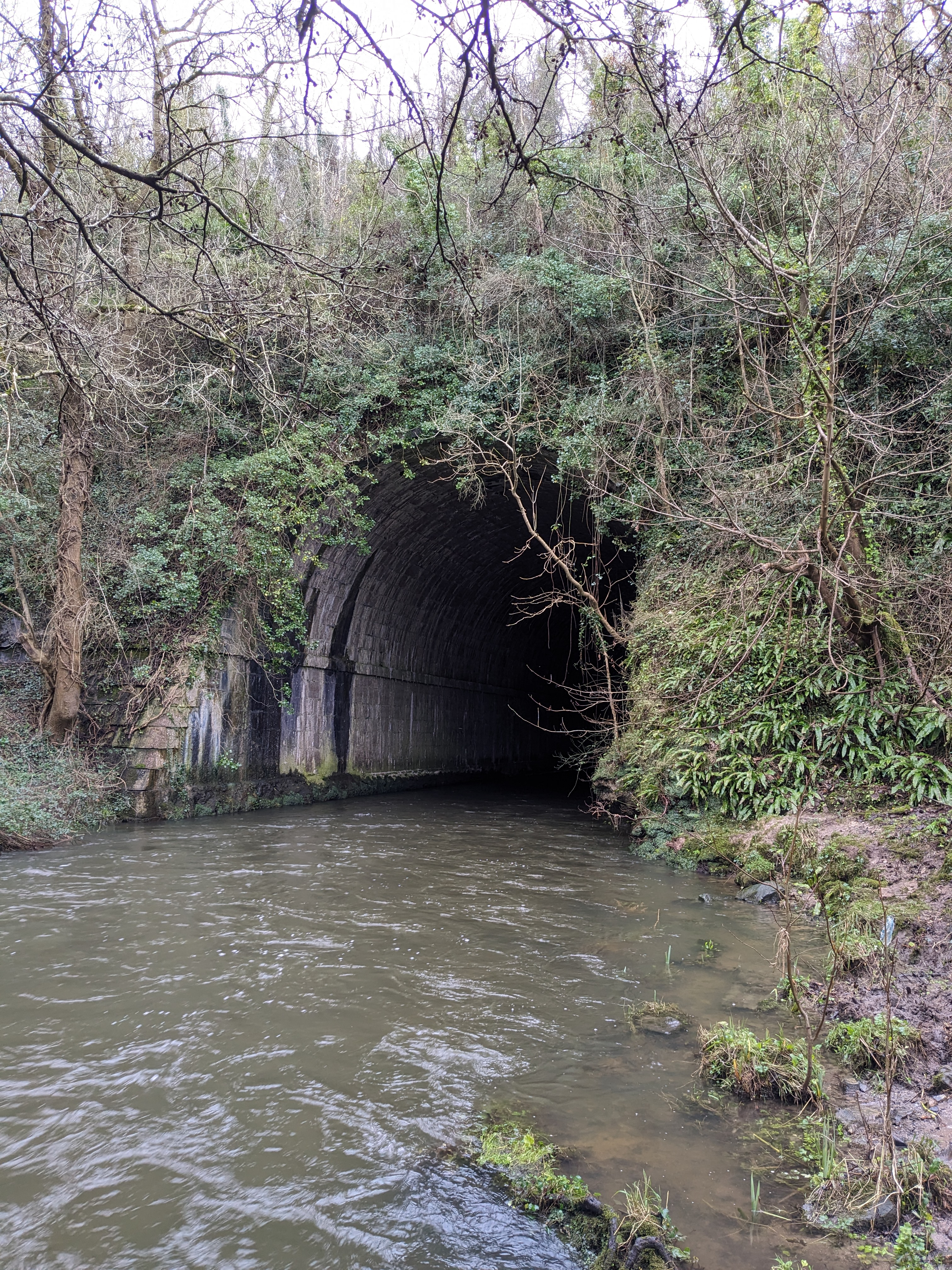
River Rye at the Ryewater Aqueduct

The Rye Water Valley/Carton SAC includes part of the Carton House estate, and the woodlands on this estate are old demesne forestry.
