= Lyreen River =

Small river in County Kildare, Ireland

Coordinates: 53°23′N 6°37′W

- Native name: An Laidhrín (Irish)

Location
- Country: Ireland

Physical characteristics
- Source
  - location: County Kildare
  - elevation: 78 m (256 ft)
- Mouth
  - location: Ryewater at Maynooth
- Length: 6 km (3.7 mi)
- Basin size: 87.5 km^{2} (33.8 sq mi)
- Discharge
  - average: 0.071 m^{3}/s (2.5 cu ft/s)

Basin features
- River system: River Liffey
- Tributaries
  - left: Maws (Crewhill) Stream
  - right: Baltracey River, Joan Slade River, Meadowbrook Stream

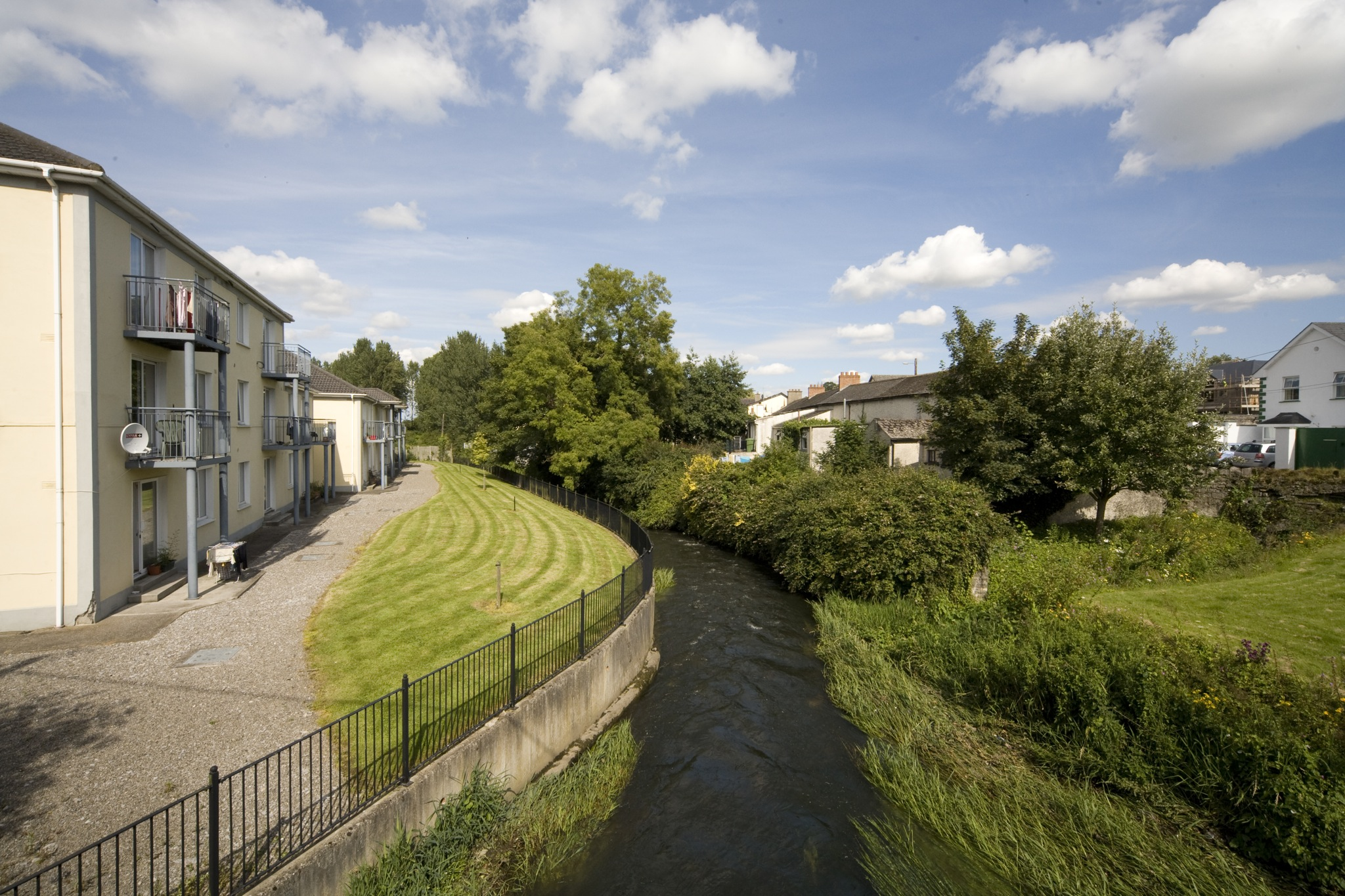
The Lyreen River in Maynooth

The Lyreen River (Irish: An Laidhrín) is a small river in County Kildare, Ireland, a tributary of the Rye River (Ryewater), and ultimately of the River Liffey.

== Name ==
The Irish name Laidhrín is diminutive of ladhar, meaning "fork". The Anglicised form is first recorded as Leyrin in The Civil Survey A.D. 1654–56, vol. viii county of Kildare.

== Course ==
The Lyreen forms from branches near Corcoranstown, some distance north of Donadea. Its first substantial tributary is the Baltracey River, joining at Graiguelin. The Baltracey comes from Donadea, including a line from Donadea Forest Park, and later a stream from Loughtown, then the Clonshanbo River, followed by other streams, from Moortown and from Rathcoffey and Raheen.

The Lyreen then flows through Derrinstown, and under the M4 between Treadstown and Crinstown, meeting another tributary just south of the railway line as it reaches the edge of Maynooth. It flows within the grounds of St Patrick's College, Maynooth and the South Campus of Maynooth University. As it enters college lands, a mill race separates, which formerly powered the Manor Mills complex; this merges back in between the college and the Manor Mills Centre. The Lyreen then passes Maynooth Castle, built at its confluence with the Joan Slade (or Owenslade) River. The Joan Slade River originates south of the Royal Canal, under which it flows near Bond Bridge, after which it flows along Parsons Street and by the castle. Running north-east, behind the house's of Maynooth's Main Street, the Lyreen receives the Meadowbrook Stream (also known as the Rowanstown River and Roosk Stream), which comes from townlands south of the canal, and flows in culvert by Straffan Road, visible on the approach to the town square.

The Lyreen bends away from Main Street and flows towards the Carton Demesne. Receiving the Maws or Crewhill Stream, it passes three artificial fishing ponds, then flows into the Rye River.

== Wildlife ==
The Lyreen has a modest fish population, with seven species detected in 2011, primarily minnow, brown trout and stone loach. The Baltracey held four species in the same study, primarily stickleback. In the angle of the confluence of the Lyreen and the Rye Water, a coarse fishing and carp fishery was built, with two ponds added to an already existing angling pond.

== Environment ==
As of 2011, the Lyreen was at an environmental status of "moderate", as was the Baltracey tributary.

== See also ==
- List of rivers of Ireland
