= River Rye (Ireland) =

River in eastern Ireland, tributary of the Liffey

Rye
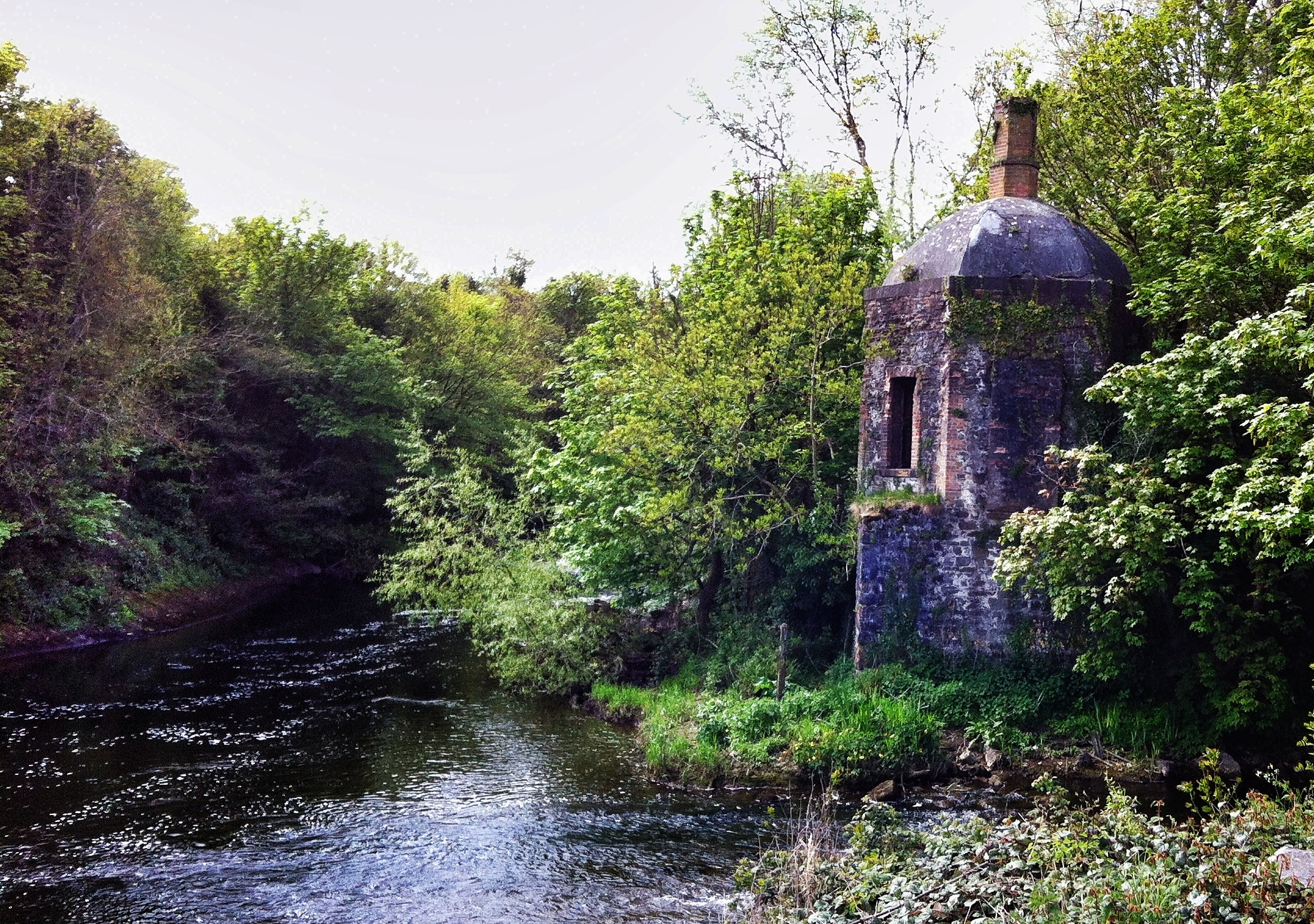
- Confluence of the Rye (right) with the Liffey (centre to left), at the Boathouse of Leixlip Castle.

Location
- Country: Ireland

Physical characteristics
- Source
  - location: Agher Cross, County Meath
  - elevation: ~122 m (400 ft)
- Mouth
  - location: River Liffey at Leixlip, County Kildare
- Length: ~30.5 km (19.0 mi)
- Basin size: 59.7 km^{2} (23.1 sq mi)
- Discharge
  - average: 0.165 m^{3}/s (5.8 cu ft/s)

Basin features
- River system: River Liffey
- Tributaries
  - left
  - right: Lyreen

The River Rye or Ryewater (Irish: Abhainn na Rí) is a tributary of the River Liffey. It rises in County Meath, flowing south-east for 19 miles. Although the river has been the subject of arterial drainage schemes, it is generally fast flowing over a stoney bottom. The Rye's major tributary is the Lyreen.

== Route ==
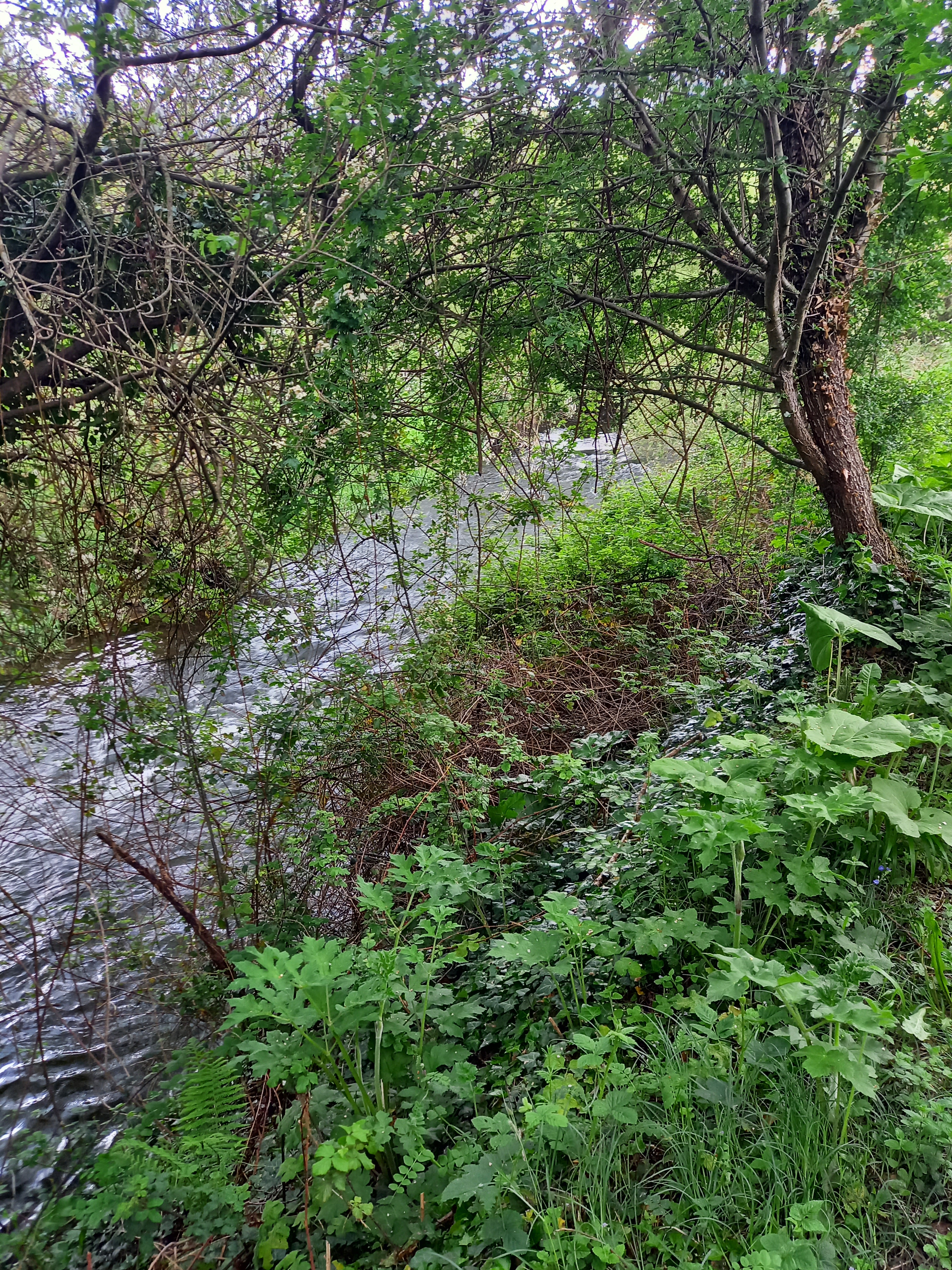
Rye Water near the Royal Canal aqueduct

The Rye runs north of Kilcock and Maynooth. Maynooth Castle is built between the Lyreen and its tributary the Joan Slade River. The Lyreen and Rye meet to the east of Maynooth and flow on through the estate of Carton House. In the estate, the river was widened to form an ornamental lake within the Georgian parklands, further enhanced by an ornamental bridge and boathouse.

The river then flows behind Intel Ireland where Intel have been monitoring the water quality since 1989.

Near Louisa Bridge in Leixlip the waters from the Leixlip Spa flow into Rye River. There is also an overflow from the canal. The Rye then flows under the Royal Canal, which is carried in the Leixlip aqueduct almost 100 feet (30m) above. The aqueduct is in fact an earth embankment, which took six years to build in the 1790s.

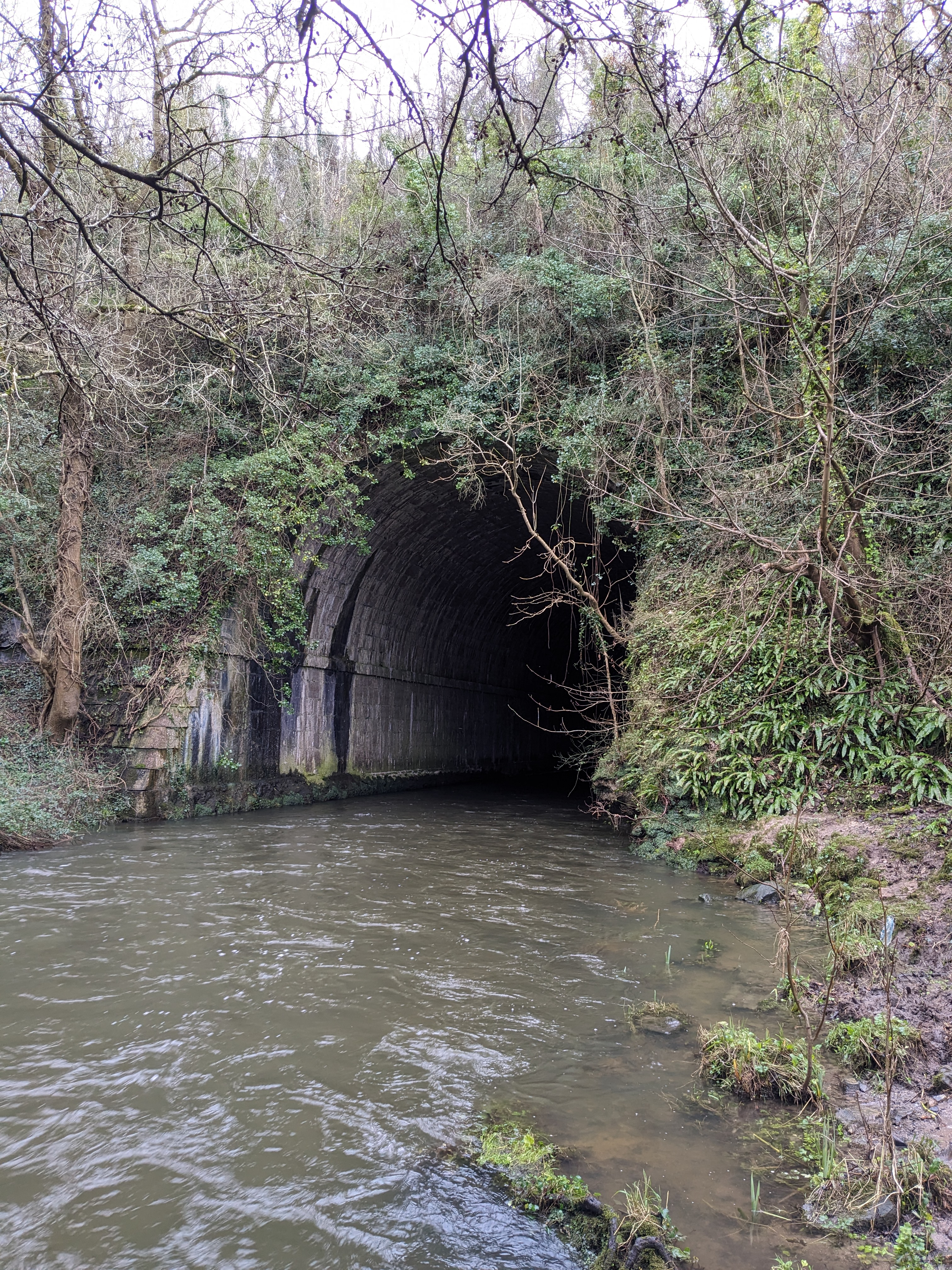
River Rye at the Ryewater Aqueduct

The Rye then descends into the heart of Leixlip. Here the river was harnessed by mills. In 1758, the site was used as a linen printing mill. Later the Rye Vale distillery was built, producing more than 20,000 gallons of whiskey annually in 1837. The distillery finally closed for good in the 1890s and the distillery has since been converted into apartments. The Rye then flows under the Rye Bridge to the confluence with the Liffey near the existing Boat House of Leixlip demesne.

== Fishing ==
The river has stocks of brown trout and pike. Angling is available at a number of locations, including a stretch belonging to Intel and managed by the Leixlip and District Angling Association, an open section also near Leixlip, and at Carton House.

== Special Area of Conservation ==
The section of the Rye River between the west end of the Carton Demesne and Leixlip Village, and its hinterland, is a Special Area of Conservation – the Rye Water Valley / Carton Special Area of Conservation. The area is also a proposed Natural Heritage Area or pNHA.

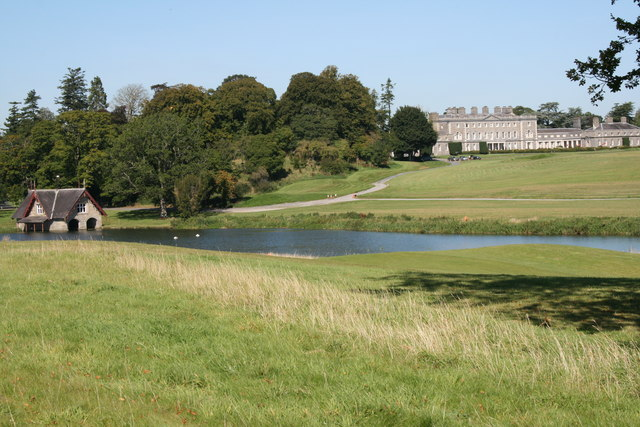
Carton House Hotel, Maynooth, Co. Kildare

=== Vulnerabilities ===
There have been at least two fish kills on the Rye River. One occurred in 2022 and involved over 500 brown trout, as well as other fish species..

Another fish kill in 2026 occurred over a 4km stretch of the river near Maynooth, where over 500 fish (including species such as brown trout, lamprey, stone loach, minnow and gudgeon) were believed to have been killed.
