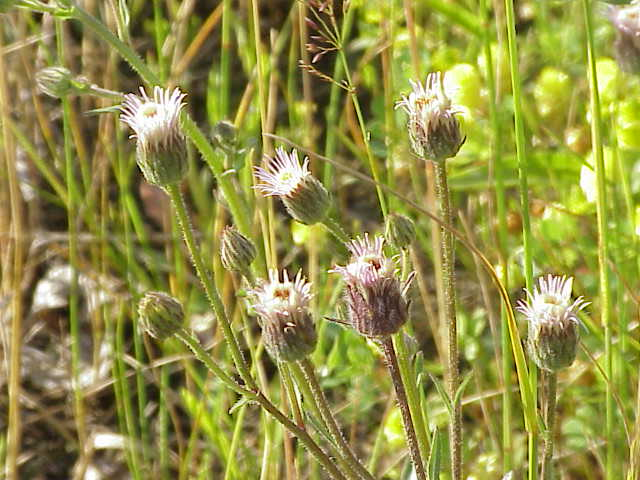

Conservation status
- Secure (NatureServe)

Scientific classification
- Kingdom: Plantae
- Clade: Tracheophytes
- Clade: Angiosperms
- Clade: Eudicots
- Clade: Asterids
- Order: Asterales
- Family: Asteraceae
- Genus: Erigeron
- Species: E. acris

Binomial name
- Erigeron acris L.

Synonyms
- Erigeron polymorphus var. acris (L.) Clemente; Inula acris (L.) Bernh.; Trimorpha acris (L.) Gray; Trimorpha vulgaris Cass.

= Erigeron acris =

Plant species in the daisy family

Erigeron acris is a widespread species of herbaceous flowering plant in the family Asteraceae. Common names include bitter fleabane and blue fleabane. The species is native to Canada, colder parts of the United States, northern, central, and southeastern Asia, and most of Europe.

Erigeron acris is a biennial or perennial herb up to 100 cm (40 inches) tall, producing a taproot and a woody rhizome. One plant can produce many small flower heads, each with pink, lilac, or occasionally white ray florets and yellow disc florets.

Subspecies and varieties:

- Erigeron acris subsp. acris
- Erigeron acris subsp. angulosus (Gaudin) Vacc.
- Erigeron acris subsp. arctophilus (Rech.f.) Rech.f.
- Erigeron acris subsp. asadbarensis (Vierh.) Rech.f.
- Erigeron acris subsp. botschantzevii
- Erigeron acris subsp. brachycephalus (H.Lindb.)
- Erigeron acris subsp. droebachensis (O.F.Müll.) Arcang.
- Erigeron acris subsp. kamtschaticus (DC.)
- Erigeron acris var. khasianus (Hook.f.)
- Erigeron acris subsp. lalehzaricus.
- Erigeron acris subsp. mesatlanticus (Maire) Maire
- Erigeron acris var. multicaulis (Wall. ex DC.)
- Erigeron acris subsp. phaeocephalus.
- Erigeron acris subsp. podolicus (Besser) Nyman
- Erigeron acris subsp. politu (Fr.) H.Lindb.
- Erigeron acris subsp. pycnotrichus (Vierh.) Grierson
- Erigeron acris subsp. staintonii.
