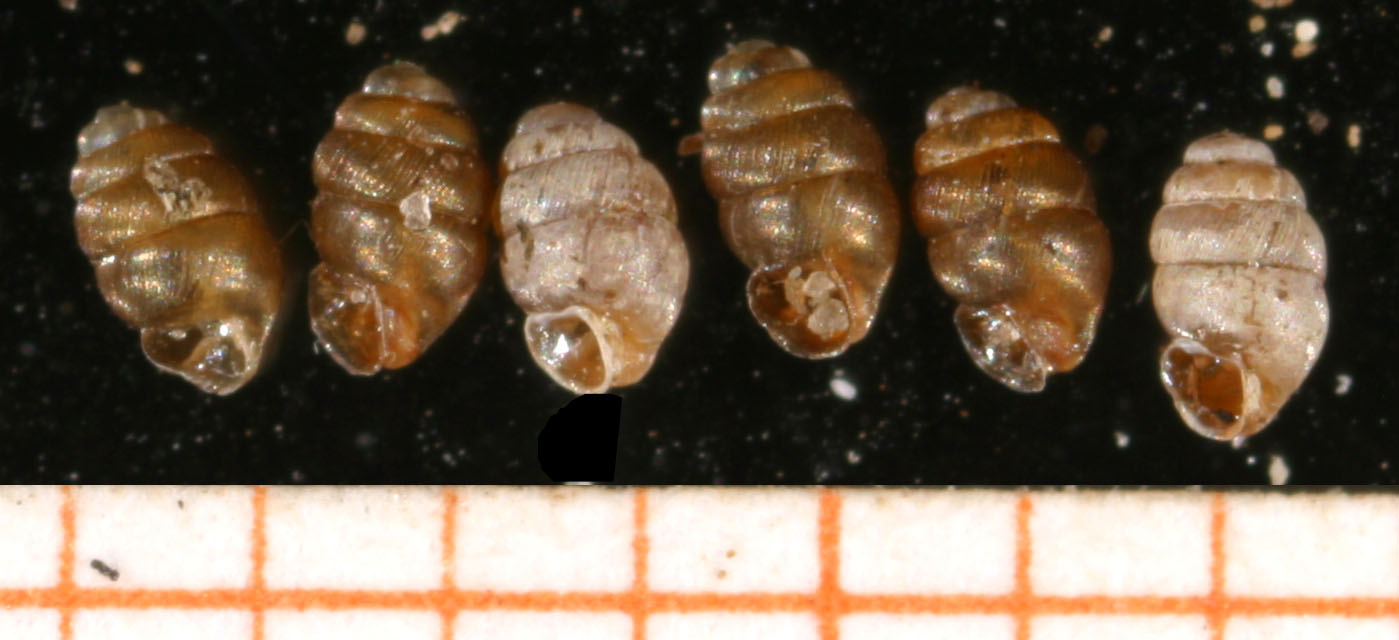
- Six shells of Vertigo angustior, scale bar in mm

Conservation status
- Near Threatened (IUCN 3.1)

Scientific classification
- Kingdom: Animalia
- Phylum: Mollusca
- Class: Gastropoda
- Order: Stylommatophora
- Family: Vertiginidae
- Subfamily: Vertigininae
- Genus: Vertigo
- Species: V. angustior

Binomial name
- Vertigo angustior Jeffreys, 1830

Synonyms
- Vertigo (Vertilla) angustior Jeffreys, 1830 · alternate representation; Vertigo hamata Held, 1837 (junior synonym); Vertigo nana Michaud, 1831 · unaccepted (junior synonym); Vertigo plicata A. Müller, 1838 (junior synonym)

= Vertigo angustior =

Narrow-mouthed whorl snail

Species of gastropod

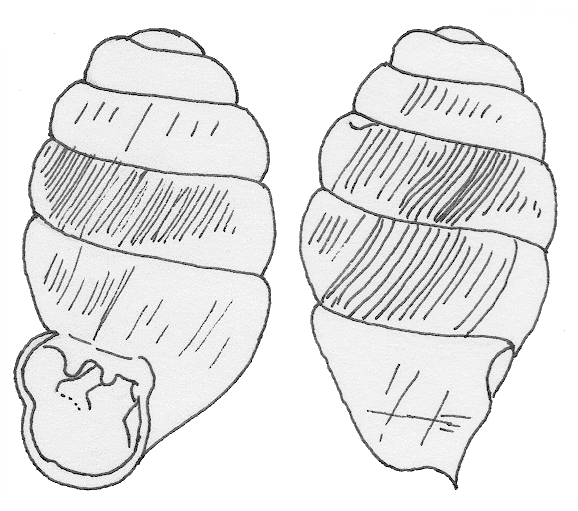
Drawing: two views of a shell of Vertigo angustior

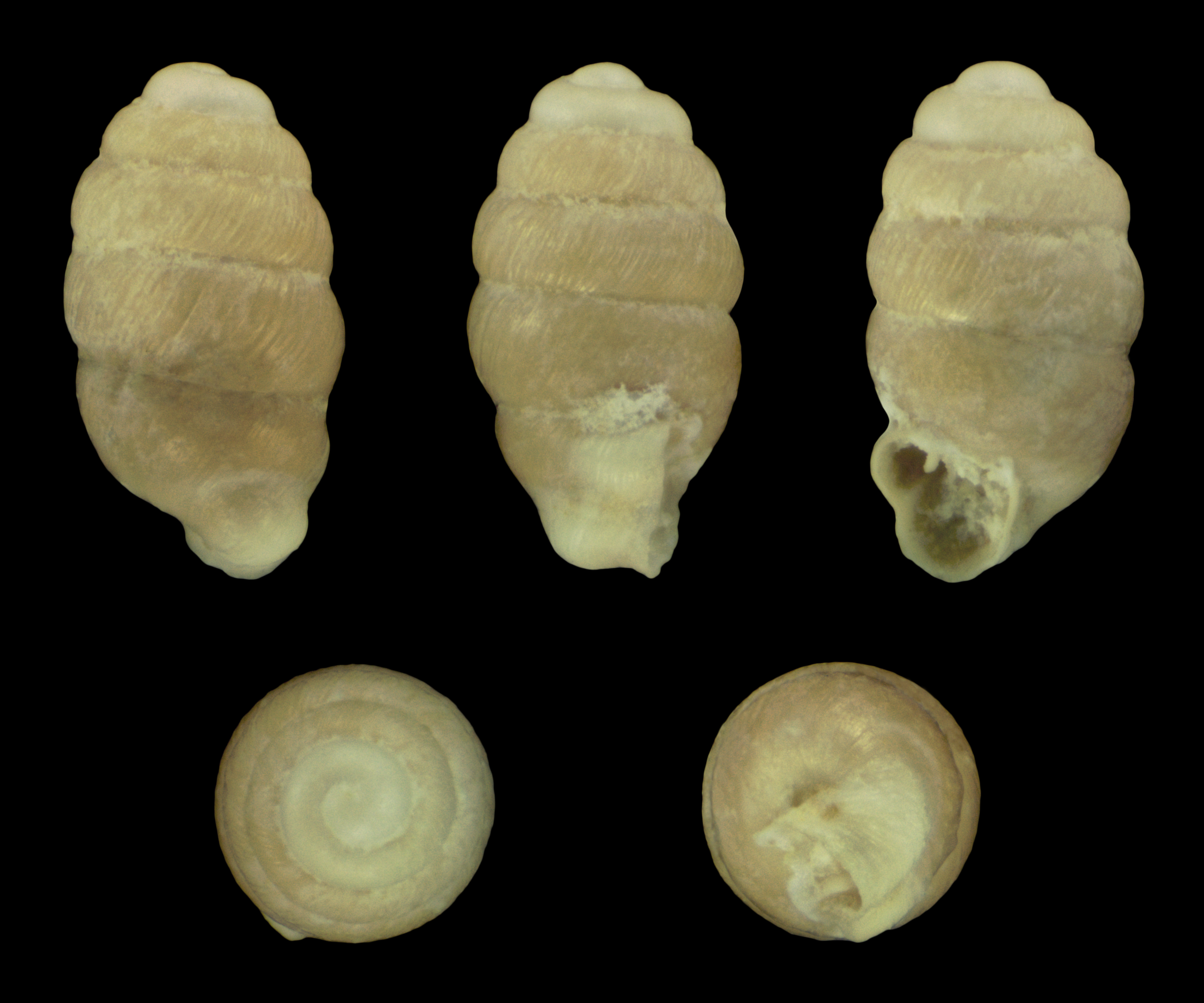
Fossil, Pleistocene

Vertigo angustior, the narrow-mouthed whorl snail, is a species of small land snail, a terrestrial pulmonate gastropod mollusk or micromollusk in the family Vertiginidae, the whorl snails.

Subspecies

- † Vertigo angustior intermedia Schlickum & Strauch, 1979

== Description ==
The shell measures 1.6 to 2.0 mm (mean: 1.8 mm) in height and 0.9 1.05 mm (mean: 1 mm) in width. It is oblong ovoid with 4.5 to 5.35 whorls (mean 5). The aperture is sinistral and relatively small. The aperture edge is bent (indented) and slightly thickened and the aperture is slightly notched, the notch continuing outside as a spiral groove. The aperture bears 5-6 mainly short denticles: 2 parietal; 2 columellar; 1 palatal, the latter relatively long. The shell is brown to yellowish brown or horn coloured and has a fine growth striation.

== Distribution ==
- IUCN red list - conservation dependent
- It is mentioned in Annex II of the European Union's Habitats Directive.

The species occurs in many countries in Europe and in Asia:

Western Europe:

- Great Britain in List of endangered species in the British Isles (Ireland, United Kingdom). Endangered in Great Britain.
- Ireland Conservation status: Vulnerable (VU)
- Belgium
- France
- Liechtenstein
- Netherlands
- Switzerland

Central Europe:

- Austria
- Czech Republic - vulnerable (VU). Its conservation status in the Czech Republic in 2004-2006 is bad (U2) in pannonian area and favourable (FV) in continental area in report for European Commission in accordance with Habitats Directive.
- Germany
- Hungary
- Poland - endangered
- Slovakia
- Slovenia

Northern Europe: Denmark, Finland, Norway, Sweden

Eastern Europe: Belarus, Estonia, Latvia, Lithuania, Russian Federation, Ukraine

Southern Europe: Italy, Romania

Asia: Armenia, Azerbaijan, Georgia.
