= Carton House =

Large country house in Maynooth, Ireland

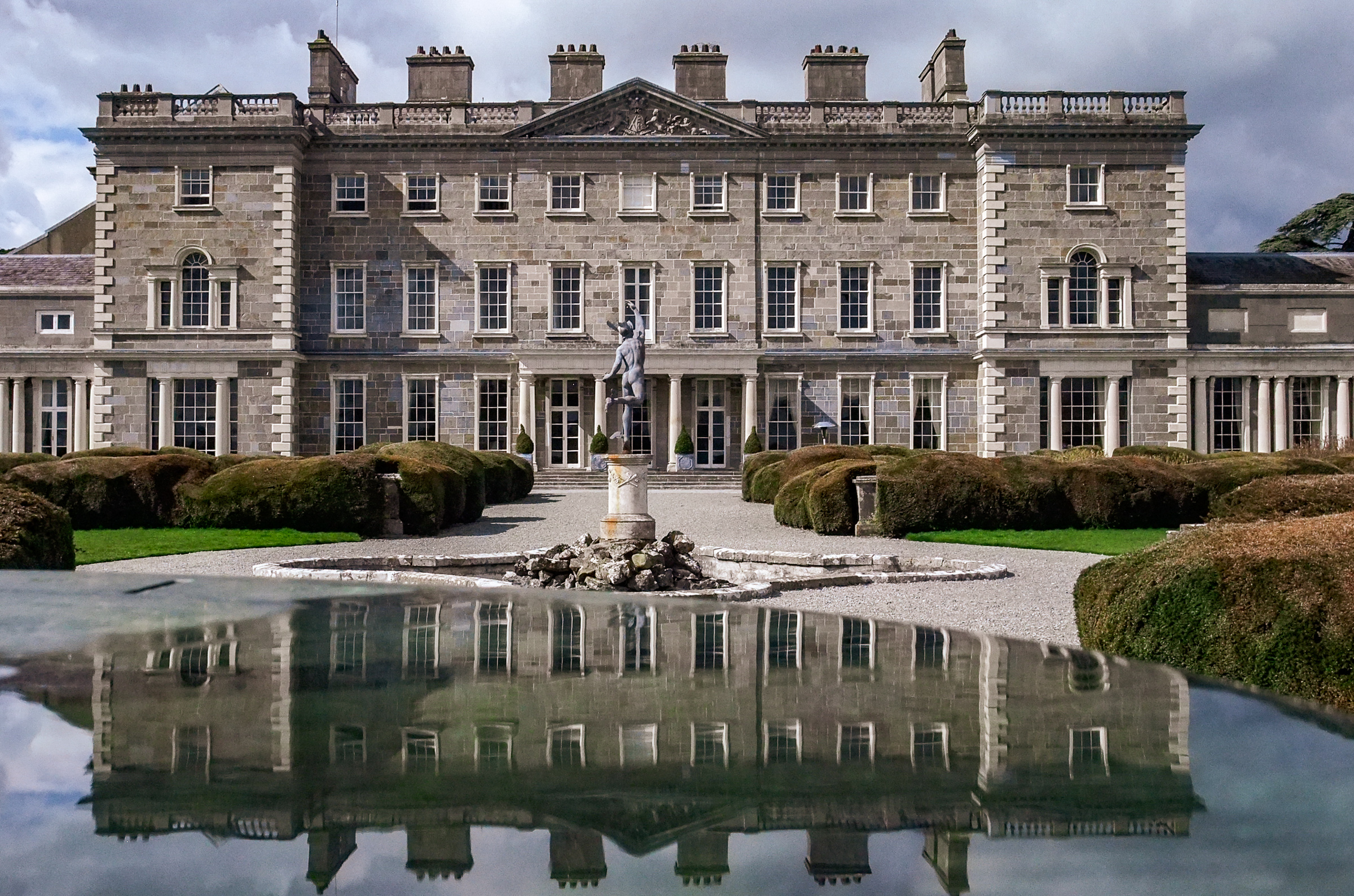
- Carton House, ancestral seat of the Dukes of Leinster, now used as a hotel

- Location within Ireland

General information
- Location: Maynooth, County Kildare, Ireland
- Coordinates: 53.390°N 6.566°W

Carton House is a country house and surrounding demesne that was the ancestral seat of the Earls of Kildare and Dukes of Leinster for over 700 years. Located 23 km west of Dublin, in Maynooth, County Kildare, the Carton Demesne is a 1,100-acre estate, from an original estate of 70,000 acres. For two hundred years, the Carton Demesne was the finest example in Ireland of a Georgian-created parkland landscape. In the 2000s, much of the demesne was redeveloped into two golf courses and the house into a hotel complex.

== History ==
=== Beginning of the Carton Demesne ===
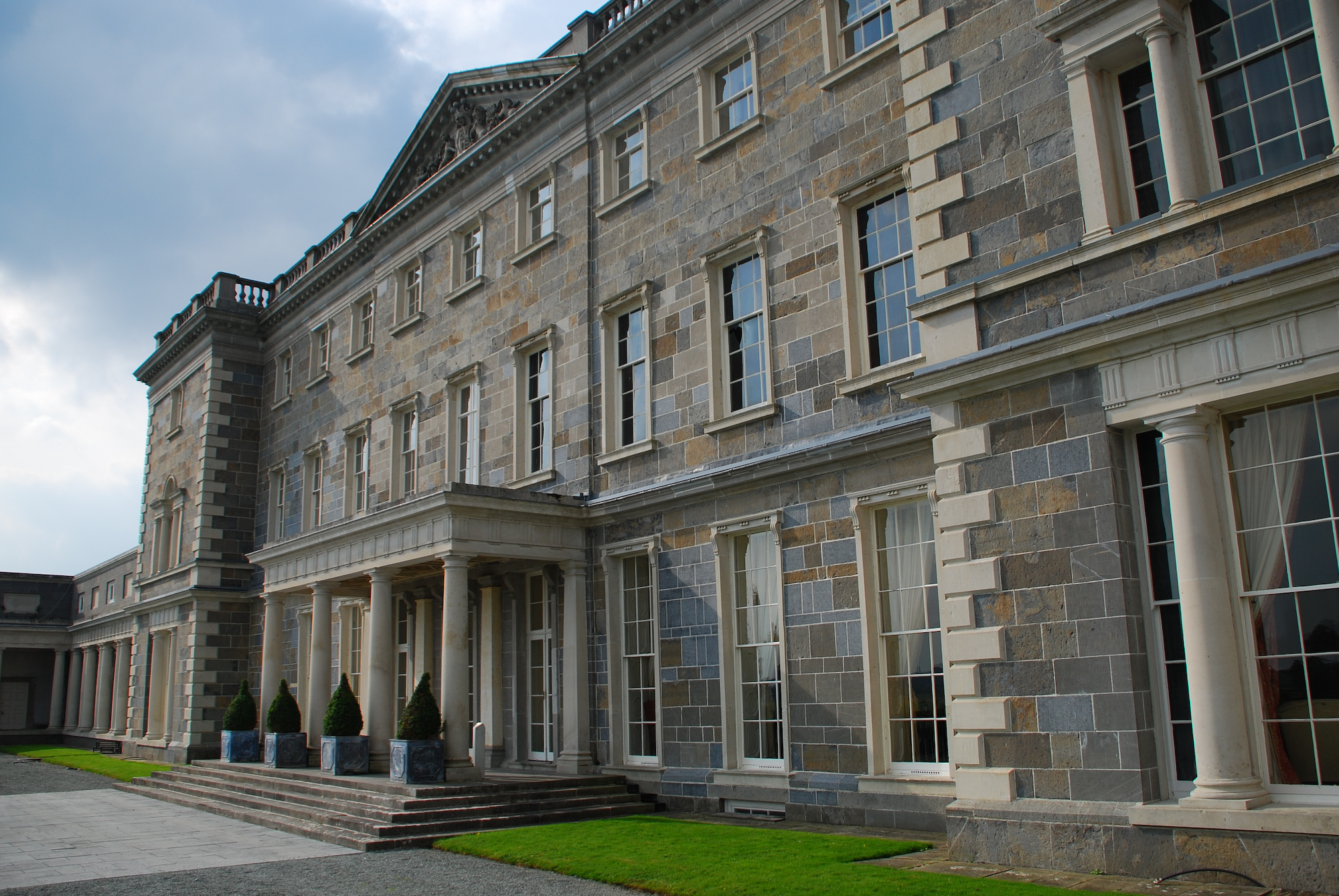
Carton House, entrance

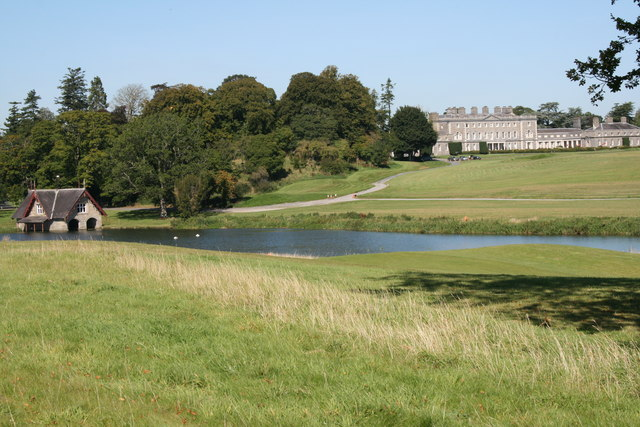
Carton House in 2009, with boathouse

The Carton Demesne first came into the ownership of the FitzGerald family shortly after Maurice FitzGerald, Lord of Lanstephan (c. 1105–1176), an Anglo-Norman noble, played an active role in the capture of Dublin by the Normans in 1170 and was rewarded by being appointed Lord of Maynooth, an area covering townlands which include Carton.

His son, Gerald FitzMaurice (c. 1150–1204), became jure uxoris 1st Baron of Offaly, and his descendant John, 4th Baron of Offaly (c. 1250–1316), became the 1st Earl of Kildare in 1315. Under Gerald FitzGerald, 8th Earl of Kildare (c. 1456–1513), a long-serving Lord Deputy of Ireland, the FitzGerald family reached pre-eminence as the virtual rulers of the Lordship of Ireland between 1477 and 1513. The Lordship of Ireland was replaced by the Kingdom of Ireland in 1542.

However, the 8th Earl's grandson, Thomas FitzGerald, 10th Earl of Kildare (1513–1537), better known to history as "Silken Thomas", was executed at Tyburn in February 1537, with his five uncles, for leading an uprising against the English Crown. "Silken Thomas", previously styled as Lord Offaly, had succeeded to the earldom in December 1534. Although the FitzGeralds subsequently regained their land and titles, they did not fully regain their position at either the Irish or British Courts until the 18th century, when Robert FitzGerald, 19th Earl of Kildare (1675–1743) became a statesman.

=== First house at Carton ===
The first record of a house at Carton was in the early seventeenth century when William Talbot, Recorder of Dublin, was given a lease of the lands by the 14th Earl of Kildare (d. February 1612) and is thought to have built a house. The house and lands were forfeited to the Crown in 1691 and in 1703 sold to Major-General Richard Ingoldsby, Master General of the Ordnance.

=== Commencement of the current house ===
In 1739, as the Ingoldsby family had lost most of their money, the lease was sold back to the 19th Earl of Kildare, who employed Richard Cassels (1690–1751) to design the existing house. This was the same year the FitzGerald family bought Frescati House. Cassels was also responsible for some other grand Irish houses, including: Castle Hume, on the shores of Lower Lough Erne in County Fermanagh; Summerhill House in County Meath; Westport House in County Mayo; Powerscourt House in County Wicklow; and, in 1745, Kildare House (later renamed Leinster House) in Dublin, which he also built for the FitzGeralds.

In 1747, the 20th Earl of Kildare (created 1st Duke of Leinster in 1766) married Lady Emily Lennox, daughter of the 2nd Duke of Richmond and great–granddaughter of King Charles II. Lady Emily played an important role in the development of the house and estate as it is today. She created the Chinese Room (bedroom of Queen Victoria) and decorated the famous Shell Cottage on the property with shells from around the world. One of their 23 children was the famous Irish patriot Lord Edward FitzGerald, a leader of the 1798 rebellion.

=== 19th century ===
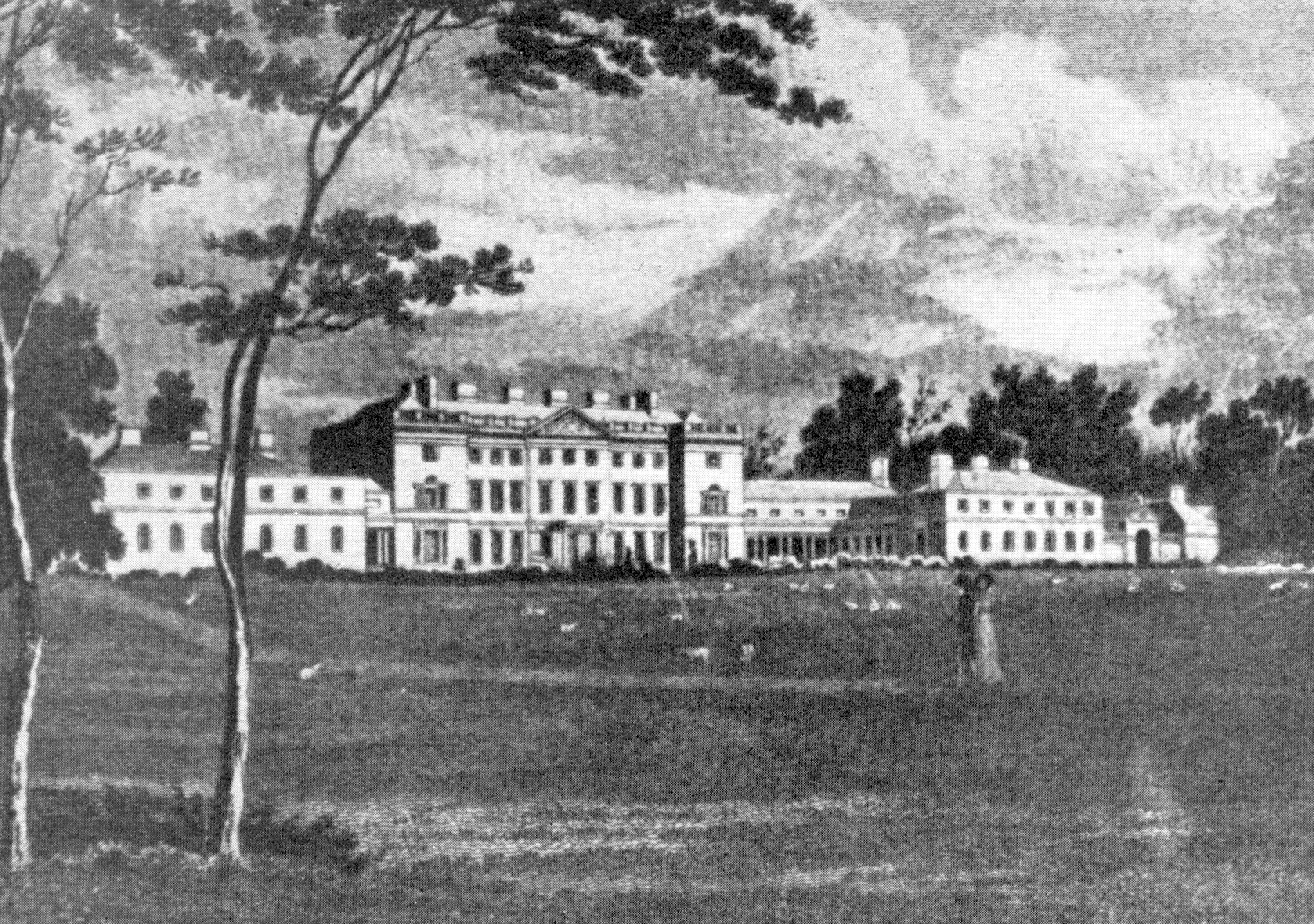
Carton House in 1824

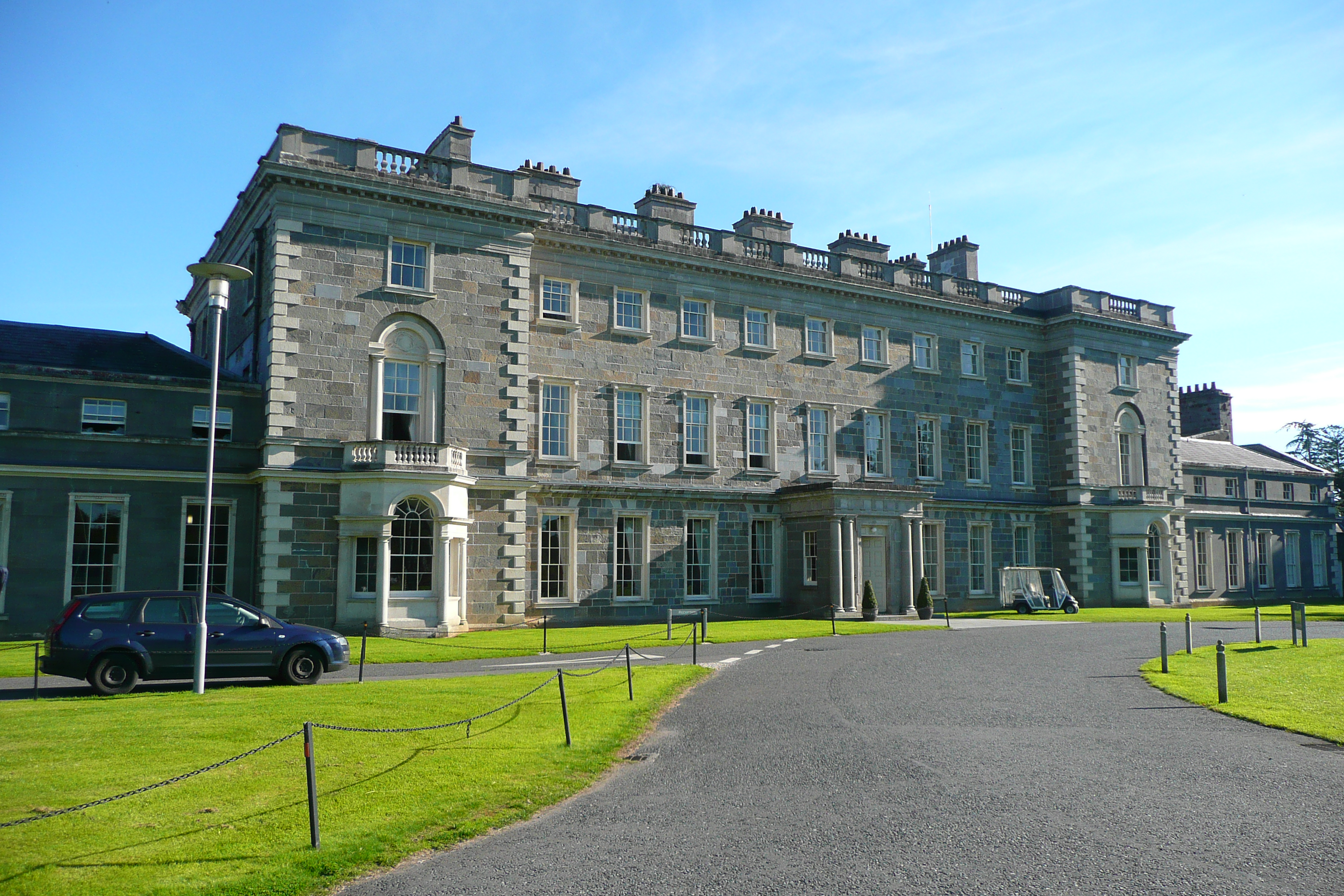
Facade and driveway of the house

Carton remained unaltered until 1815, when His Grace The 3rd Duke of Leinster (1791–1874) decided to sell Leinster House to the Dublin Society (renamed the Royal Dublin Society in 1820) and make Carton his principal residence. He employed Richard Morrison to enlarge and re-model the house. Morrison replaced the curved colonnades with straight connecting links to obtain additional rooms, including the famous Dining Room. At this time, the entrance to the house was moved to the north side.

=== 20th- and 21st-century history ===
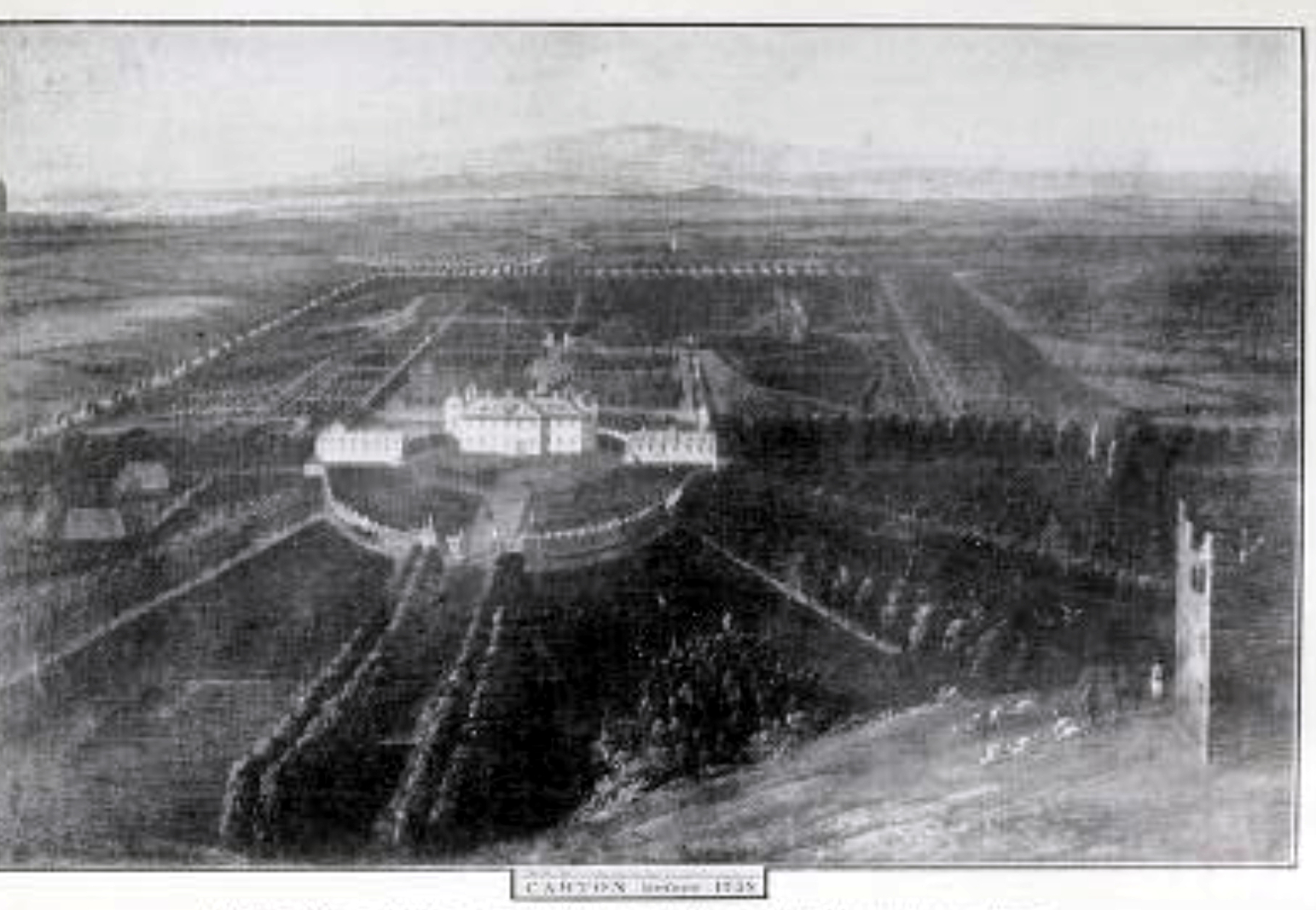
Carton House estate initially

Carton remained in the control of the FitzGeralds until the early twentieth century when the 7th Duke of Leinster (1892–1976) sold his life interest to a moneylender, Sir Harry Mallaby-Deeley, to pay off gambling debts of £67,500. The 7th Duke, who was known as Lord Edward FitzGerald up until he inherited the dukedom in February 1922, was originally third in line to succeed, so he did not think he would ever inherit. However, both of his older brothers were unmarried and predeceased him.

His eldest brother was the 6th Duke of Leinster (1887–1922), who had succeeded as a child to the dukedom and estates in December 1893 but who suffered from serious psychiatric issues; the 6th Duke lived from 1907 until his death in February 1922 in a house in the grounds of Craig House Psychiatric Hospital in Edinburgh. Lord Edward's other older brother was Major Lord Desmond FitzGerald (1888–1916), an officer in the Irish Guards who was accidentally killed during a grenade demonstration at Calais during the First World War. So, Lord Edward inherited the dukedom and what remained of the Carton Estate in February 1922, thus becoming the 7th Duke. In this way, much of the Carton Estate was lost to the FitzGerald dynasty. Carton House and what remained of the Carton Estate was finally sold by the 7th Duke of Leinster and his son, the then Marquess of Kildare (1914–2004), in the late 1940s.

It is alleged that, in 1923, a local unit of the IRA went to Carton with the intention of burning it down. However, they were stopped when a member of the FitzGerald family brought a large painting of Lord Edward FitzGerald to the door and pointed out that they would be burning the house of a revered Irish patriot.

During the Second World War, Carton House was occupied by the Irish Army who used the building as the headquarters of the 2nd Infantry Division.

In 1949 the house was purchased by the 2nd Baron Brocket (1904–1967), a multi-millionaire Tory peer and businessman and a member, by descent, of the ancient Ulster family of Ó Catháin (O'Cahan or O'Kane), whose principal residence was Brocket Hall in Hertfordshire, England. Lord Brocket bequeathed Carton to his younger son, The Hon. David Nall-Cain who, having moved to the Isle of Man, sold the house in 1977 to the Mallaghan family.

In 2017 the Mallaghan family sold Carton House to John Mullen for €57 Million.

=== Government decision not to buy the estate ===
From 1977 to 2017, Carton House and Demesne was the property of the Mallaghan family, and in the 1980s and 1990s, the Irish Government came under public and political pressure to buy the house and its grounds but decided not to do so.

=== House as film set ===
The house was used as a film location by many film-makers and broadcasters. Two of the films made there were Stanley Kubrick's Barry Lyndon in 1975 and Samuel Fuller'sThe Big Red One in 1980. They starred Ryan O'Neal (as an 18th-century Irish adventurer, with a soundtrack by The Chieftains) and Lee Marvin respectively. The film Leap Year, starring Amy Adams, Matthew Goode, and Adam Scott, shot some scenes at Carton during 2009.

Director Blake Edwards and wife actress, Julie Andrews, lived in Carton House over the summer and autumn of 1969 while filming the movie Darling Lili (1970). Rock Hudson, Andrews' co-star also lived on the grounds during filming. The actual house was used in the movie in several interior and exterior scenes.

In the early 21st century, Carton House was used as a filming location for the Irish drama Love/Hate.

=== Conversion into resort ===
In 2000, Carton was redeveloped as a "premier golf resort and hotel", an action condemned by heritage groups, including An Taisce, and criticised in Seanad Éireann (the Irish Senate) by Senator David Norris. A hotel was added to the main house, altering it drastically, while the estate's eighteenth-century grounds were converted into two golf courses.

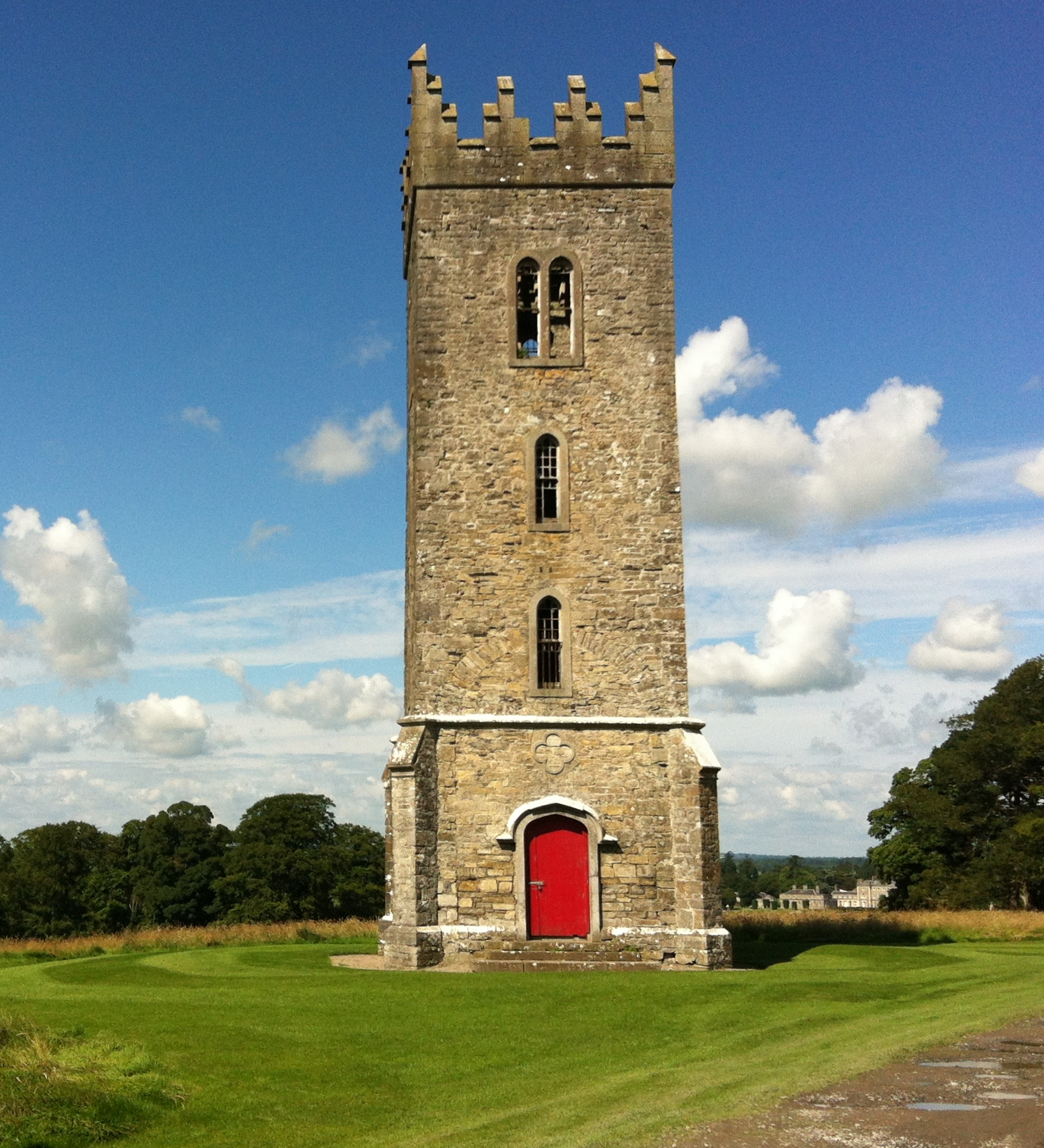
Tyrconnell Tower, Carton Estate.

== Grounds ==
=== Tyrconnell Tower ===
Allegedly originally built by Richard Talbot, 1st Earl of Tyrconnell, and intended for his mausoleum. Its official name is The Prospect Tower.

=== Shell Cottage ===
The Shell Cottage is a cottage which once had a thatched roof and is decorated outside and inside with seashells. It was built for Emily FitzGerald, Duchess of Leinster (1731–1814), wife of James FitzGerald, 1st Duke of Leinster. The cottage was the home of the singer, songwriter and actress Marianne Faithfull from the late 1980s and through the 1990s.

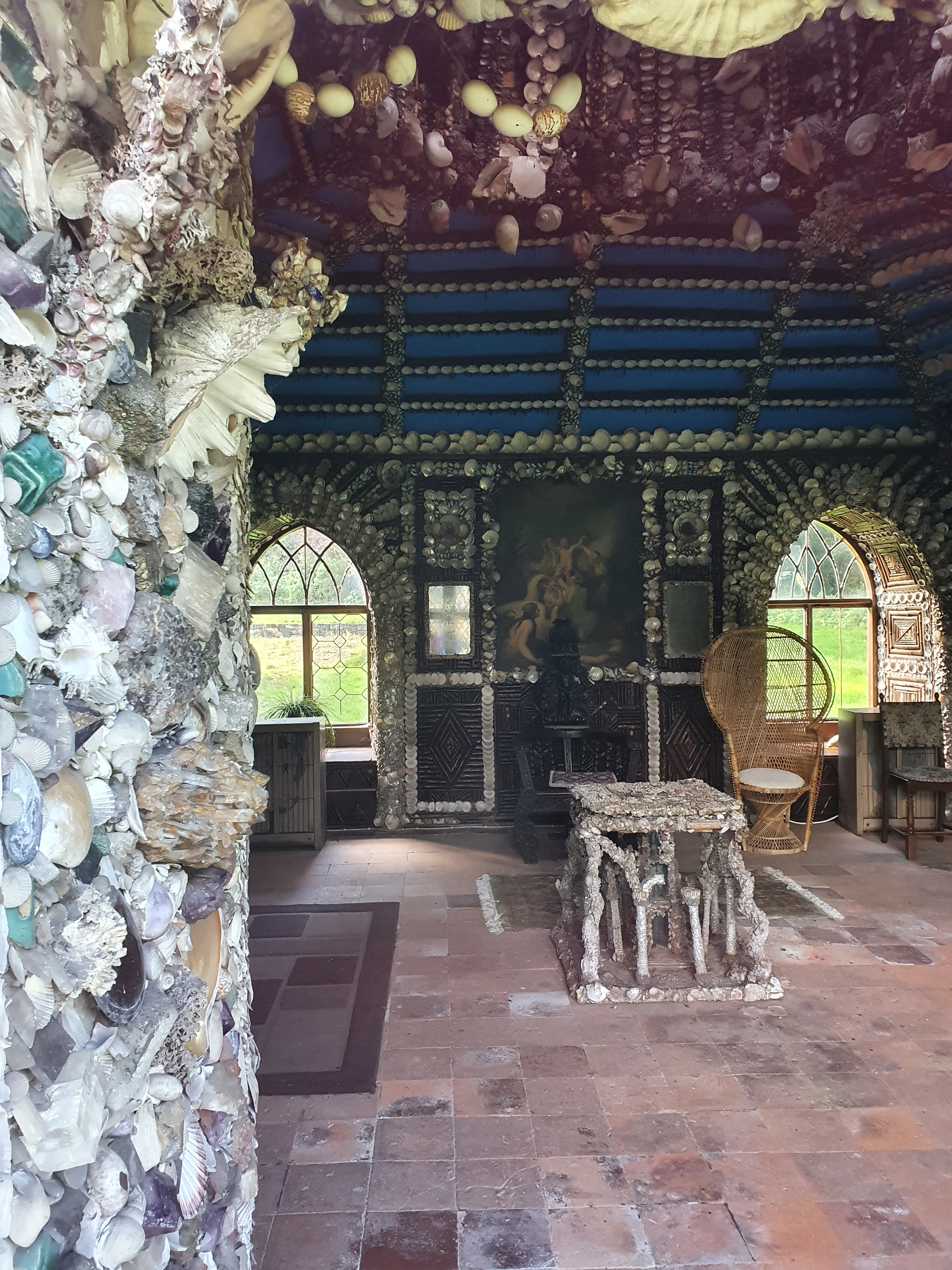
Interior of the Shell Cottage at Carton House

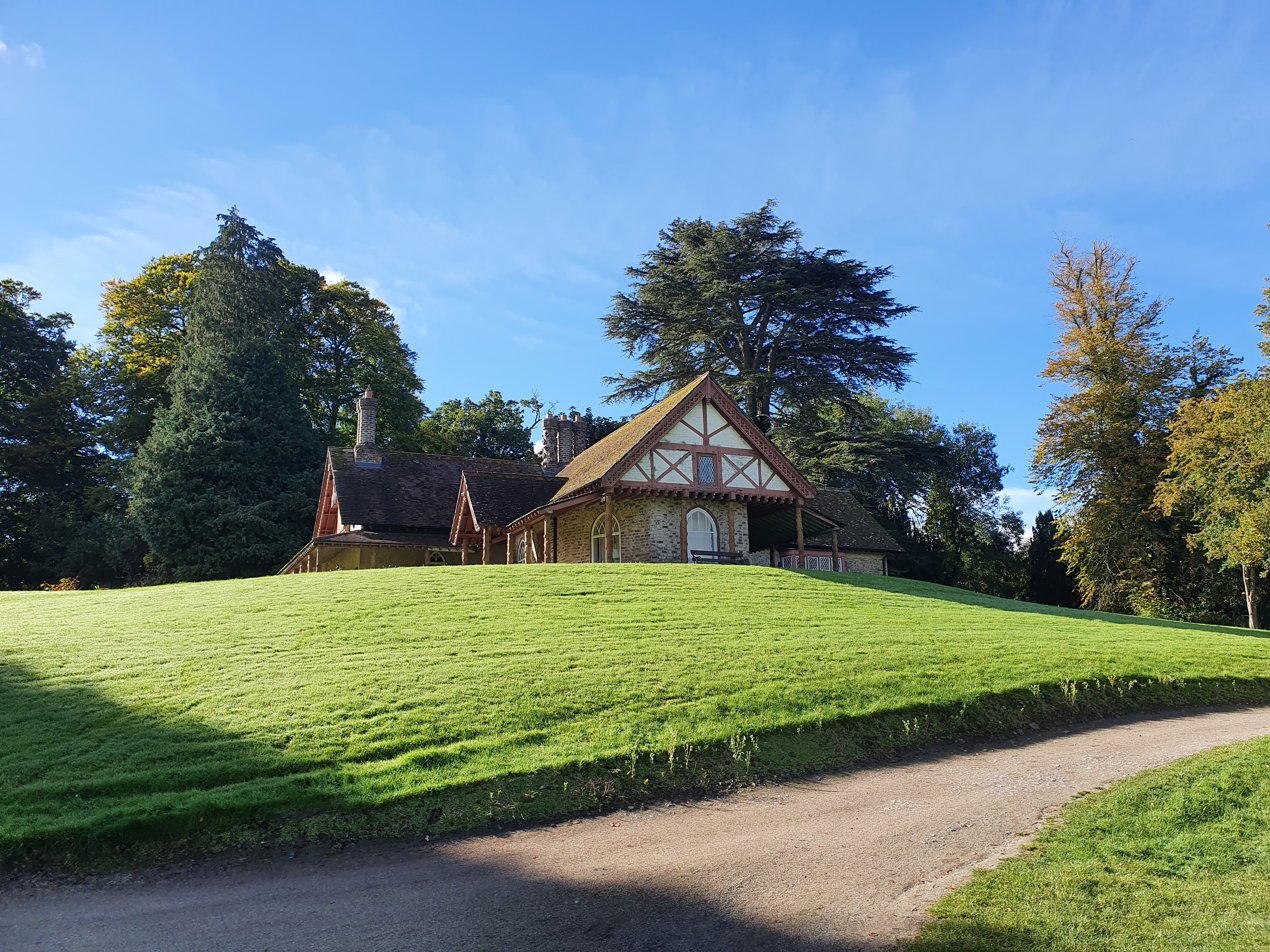
Exterior view of the Shell Cottage

== Sport ==
=== Golf ===
Carton House Golf Club has two courses, one designed by Mark O'Meara and opened in 2002, and the other designed by Colin Montgomerie and opened in 2003. The former is a parkland course, utilising the rolling land of the estate as well as the waters of the River Rye, while the latter is an inland links and features head high pot bunkers, "fast-running" greens and narrow fairways.

Carton House was the venue for the European Tour's Nissan Irish Open in 2005 and 2006, having previously hosted the 2004 and 2005 AIB Amateur Open Championship. In 2006, Carton House was the first Irish golf club to be awarded the 'Committed to Green' environmental award by the International Committed to Green Foundation, and the International Association of Golf Tour Operators, European Golf Resort of the Year 2008. The 2013 Irish Open was held on the Montgomerie Course at Carton House (27–30 June). The winner was England's Paul Casey with a −5 (67) on the final day including an eagle on the last for a total of −14 to win by 3.

==== Golf Ireland ====
In 2020, Golf Ireland was established as the single governing body for golf in Ireland by the amalgamation of the Golfing Union of Ireland (or GUI; the men's association founded in 1891) and Irish Ladies Golf Union (or ILGU; the ladies' association founded in 1893). The GUI had their national headquarters on the Carton House Demesne, which facility also comprised the GUI National Academy, a 22-acre (89,000 m^{2}) teaching facility for up-and-coming golfers, as well as being a facility available to all golfers in Ireland.

=== Rugby ===
The IRFU have used the house and its demesne for training and a team base since 2010.

=== Football ===
A number of football teams come to Carton House for pre-season training. Newcastle United F.C. became the first team to train at the Platinum One group facility. Real Madrid became the second team to go to Carton House in 2009. Shamrock Rovers F.C. also trained there ahead of the 2010 season. Chelsea F.C. and Birmingham City F.C. have trained at the facility. It was visited by the Brazil national team during 2008. In July 2010, Wolverhampton Wanderers held a week-long training camp. During an interview for Irish TV, Wolves manager Mick McCarthy stated that Middlesbrough FC would be there later. In July 2013 Birmingham City F.C. held a week-long training camp. In 2016 Newcastle United F.C. spent a week at Carton House during pre-season, and returned for another week-long stay in pre-season 2017 and 2018. Burnley FC also visited during pre-season 2017. Manchester United used the hotel as a pre-season training camp ahead of their fixture against Leeds United in Dublin in August 2026 under manager Michael Carrick.

=== GAA ===
Dublin GAA used Carton House Demesne for training during the summer of 2009.

== Bibliography ==
- Murdoch, Tessa (ed.) (2022). Great Irish Households: Inventories from the Long Eighteenth Century. Cambridge: John Adamson, inventory of Carton House given in transcript, pp. 247–56 and 265–303 ISBN 978-1-898565-17-8 OCLC 1233305993
