= Lacy's Canal =

Lacy's Canal is a 3 km (1.9 mi) canal which formerly linked the town of Mullingar to the northern shore of Lough Ennell in County Westmeath, Ireland. It was constructed in the 18th century and named after Hugh de Lacy, Lord of Meath, who lived in Mullingar in the 12th century. It starts at the rear of the Lynn Industrial Estate and enters Lough Ennell about 2.1 km South of the Joe Dolan bridge, or 700 m South of the Lynn road bridge. At the Lynn road bridge, there is good parking and it is easy to launch and recover a canoe or kayak. The canal is easily navigable from here to Lough Ennell, and for some way northwards, but there is no easy access point nearer to Mullingar. The Northern part of the canal is overgrown (heavily in places) but there is sufficient water depth throughout. It is crossed by both the Lynn road bridge and the Joe Dolan bridge.
