= Columb Barracks =

Military installation at Mullingar in Ireland

- Dún Cholumb
- Mullingar, Ireland
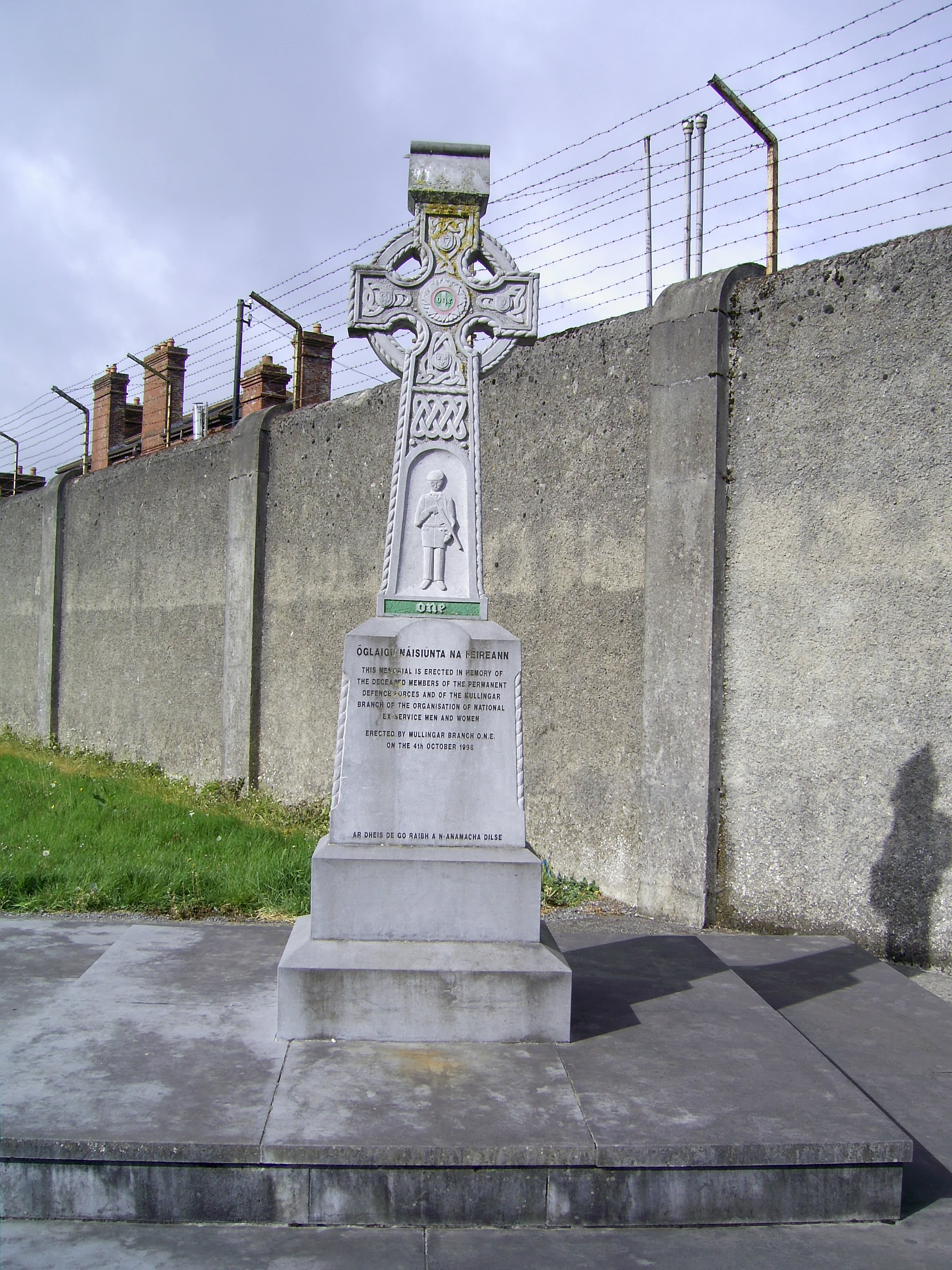
- Memorial at Columb Barracks

Site information
- Type: Barracks
- Operator: (Republic of Ireland) Irish Army

Location
- Location within Ireland
- Coordinates: 53.52649°N 7.35292°W

Site history
- Built: 1814-1819
- Built for: War Office
- In use: 1819-2012

Columb Barracks (Irish: Dún Cholumb) was a military installation at Mullingar in Ireland.

== History ==
The barracks, which were originally known as Wellington Barracks after Arthur Wellesley, 1st Duke of Wellington, were built as part of the response to the Irish Rebellion and completed between 1814 and 1819. The barracks were taken over by forces of the Irish Free State in 1922 and renamed Columb Barracks in Honour of Adjutant Patrick Columb, a member of the Irish Free State Army who had been killed in Mullingar by Anti-Treaty Forces (Irregular IRA) in April 1922. Volunteer Joe Leavy, a native of Milltownpass and a member of the Anti-treaty Forces, was also killed. They became home first to the 4th Field Supply and Transport Company and later to 4th Field Artillery Regiment and 54th Reserve Field Artillery Regiment. Notwithstanding strong objections from Willie Penrose, who resigned as Minister of State for Housing over the issue, and strong local protests, the barracks closed in March 2012.

== See also ==
- List of Irish military installations
