= Mullingar =

Town in County Westmeath, Ireland

Mullingar An Muileann gCearr (Irish)
- Town
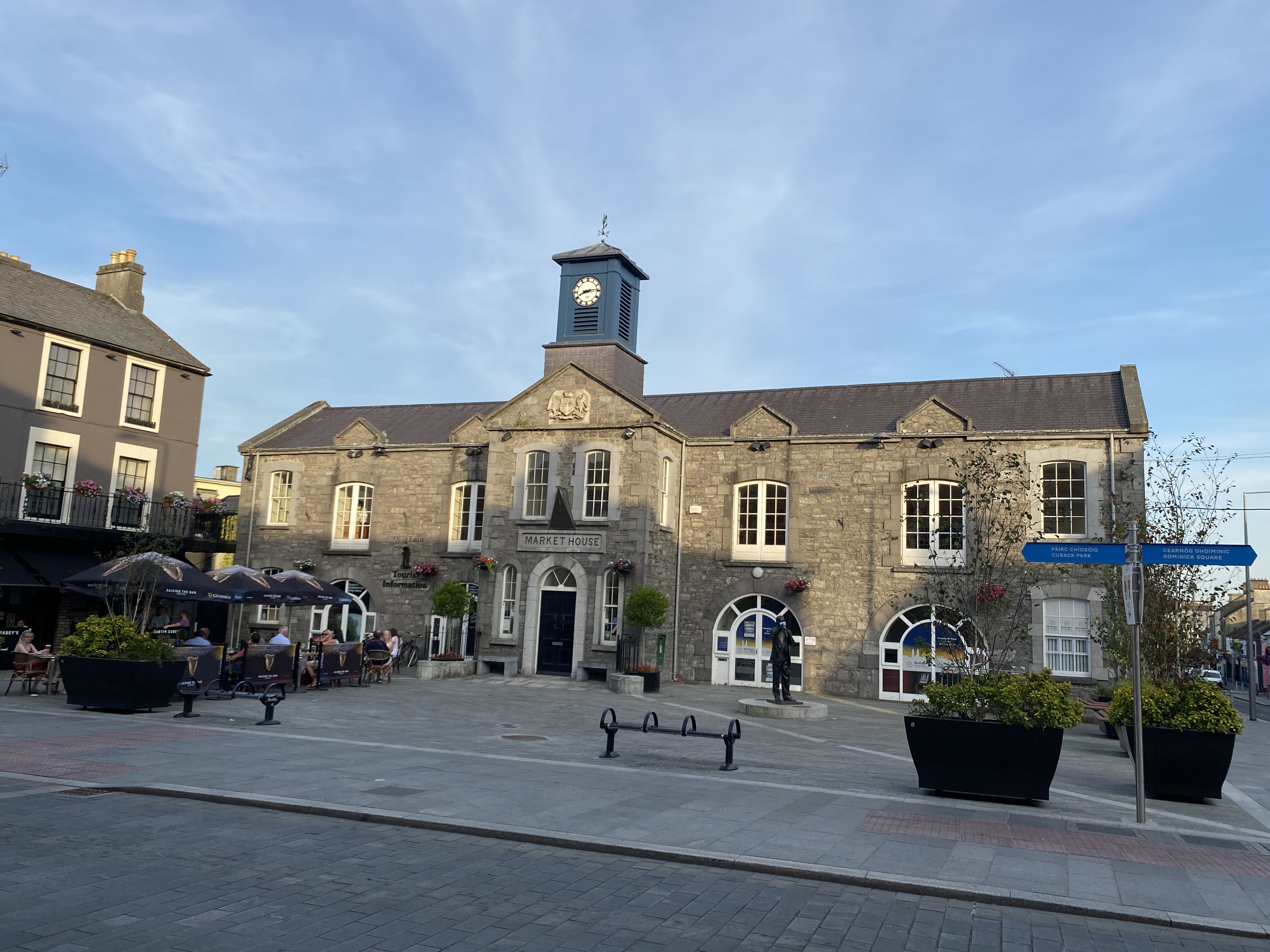
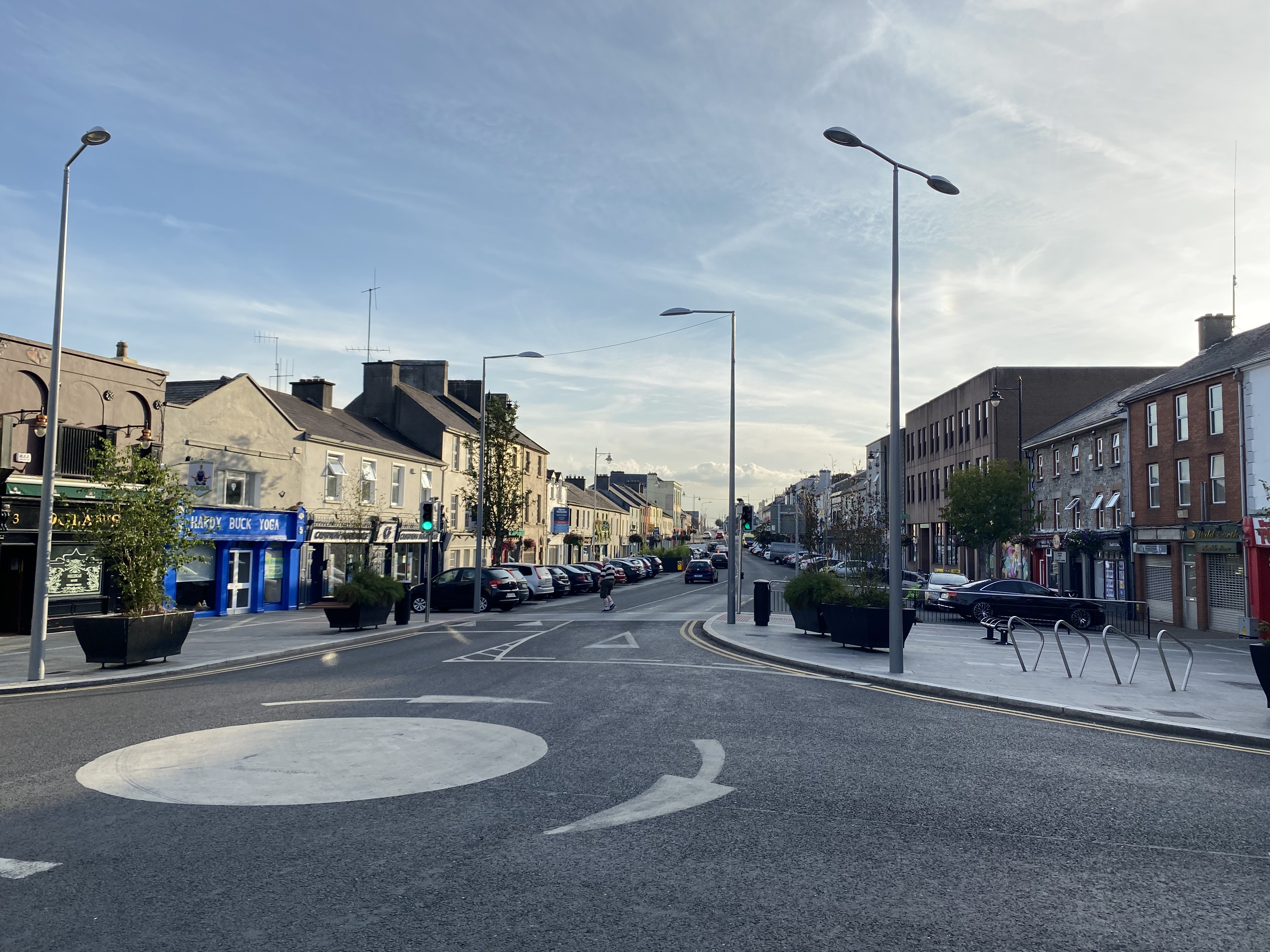
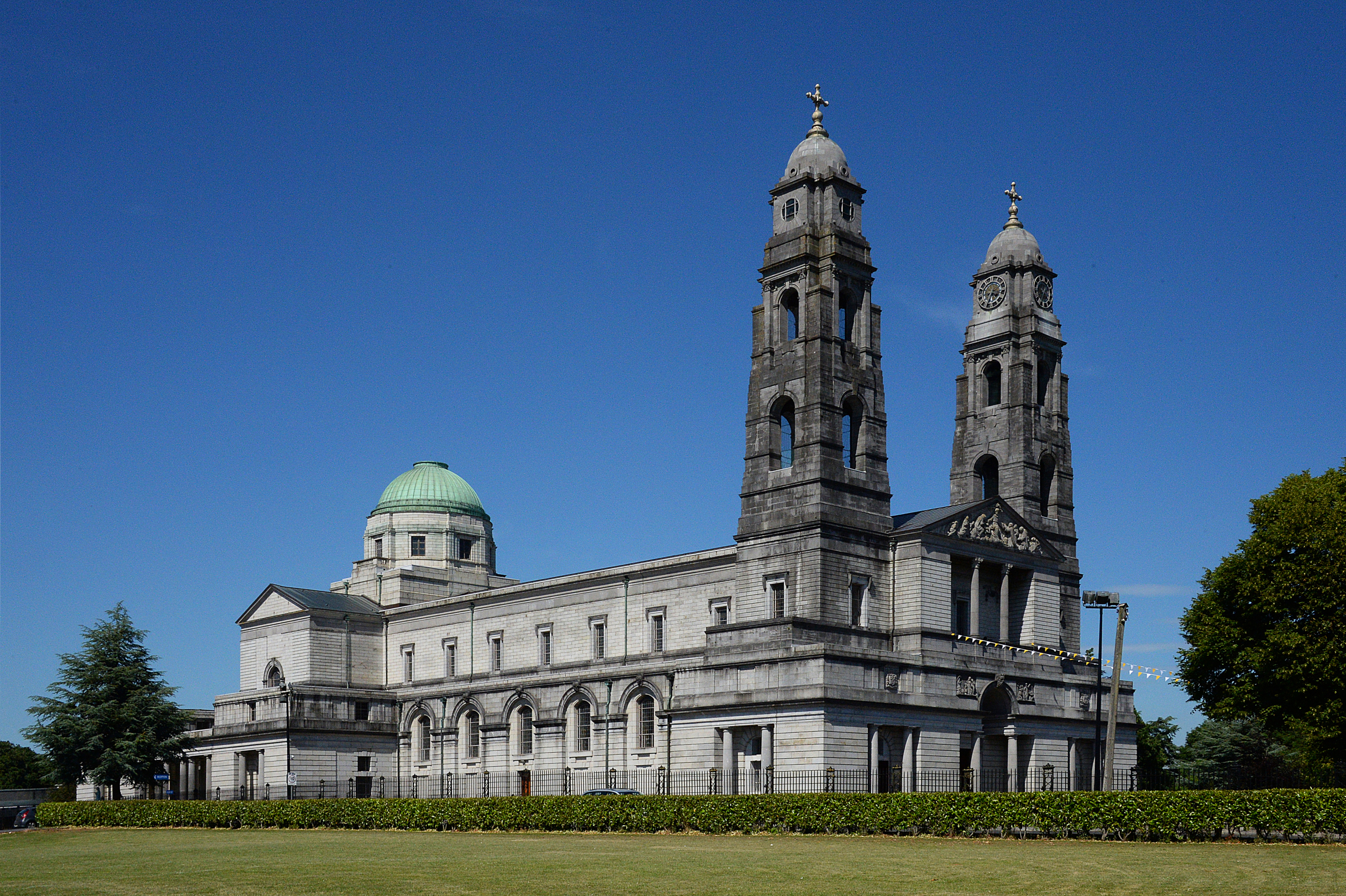
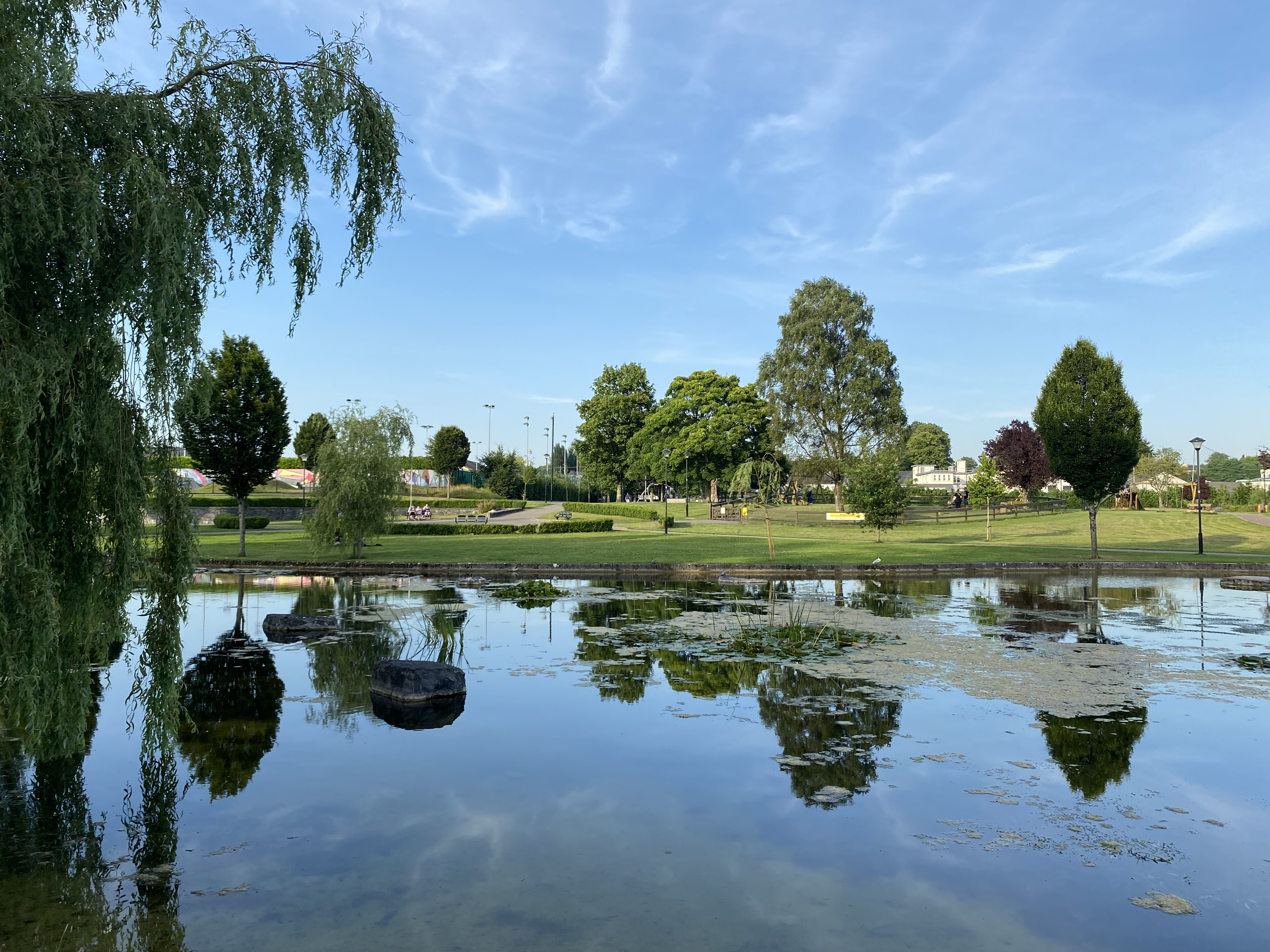
- Market Square Dominick Street Mullingar Cathedral Town Park

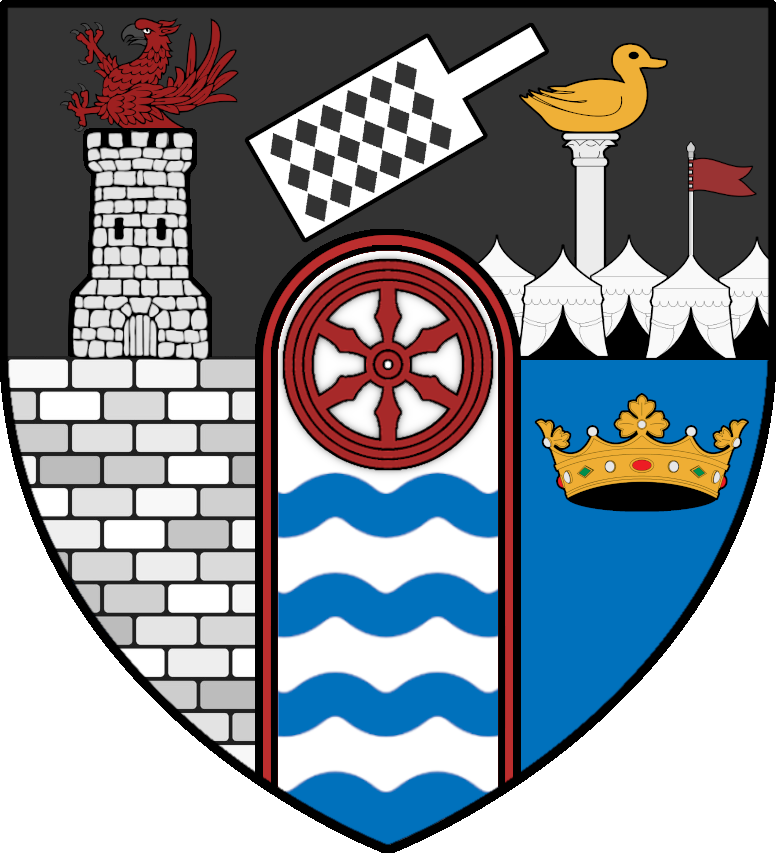
- Coat of arms

- Location in Ireland
- Coordinates: 53°31′21″N 7°20′16″W
- Country: Ireland
- Province: Leinster
- Region: Eastern and Midland
- County: Westmeath

Government
  - Local authority: Westmeath County Council
  - Dáil constituency: Longford–Westmeath
- Elevation: 101 m (331 ft)

Population (2022)
  - Total: 22,667
- Time zone: UTC±0 (WET)
  - Summer (DST): UTC+1 (IST)
- Eircode routing key: N91
- Telephone area code: +353(0)44
- Irish Grid Reference: N425523

Mullingar (/ˌmʌlɪnˈɡɑːr/ MUL-in-GAR; Irish: An Muileann gCearr, meaning 'the left-hand mill' [ən̪ˠ ˌmˠɪlʲən̪ˠ ˈɟɑːɾˠ]) is the county town of County Westmeath in Ireland. It is the third most populous town in the Midland Region, with a population of 22,667 in the 2022 census.

The Counties of Meath and Westmeath Act 1543 proclaimed Westmeath a county, separating it from County Meath. Mullingar became the administrative centre for County Westmeath. The town was originally named Maelblatha, and takes its modern name from a mill noted in the legend of Colman of Mullingar.

Traditionally a market town serving the surrounding agricultural hinterland, Mullingar's cattle market closed in 2003 for the development of a mixed commercial and residential scheme called Market Point.

Mullingar has a number of neighbouring lakes, including Lough Owel, Lough Ennell and Lough Derravaragh. Lough Derravaragh is also known for its connection with the Irish legend of the Children of Lir. The town of Mullingar is linked to Lough Ennell via Lacy's Canal and the River Brosna. Another nearby waterway is the Royal Canal, which loops around Mullingar.

== History ==
The town developed at a fording point on the River Brosna. Evidence of ancient settlement within Mullingar include records of a motte-and-bailey castle, a tower house known as Mullingar Castle, a number of fortified houses and several water mills. The town's Irish name, An Muileann gCearr meaning a "wry or left-handed mill", refers to one of these mills.

Former monastic settlements, founded in Mullingar, included the Augustinian Priory of St. Mary (established by the Bishop of Meath in 1227) and a Dominican friary (reputedly established by the Nugent family in 1237). The sites of these two monasteries, which were "dissolved" in the 16th century, were in ruin by the late 17th century.

When County Westmeath was formed in the 1540s, with the passing of the Counties of Meath and Westmeath Act 1543, Mullingar became the "shire town" for the newly formed county. It was also a garrison town, following the completion of Wellington Barracks (later Columb Barracks) in the early 19th century.

The current cathedral in Mullingar, the Cathedral of Christ the King, was built in the 1930s on the site of a former 19th century cathedral.

== Demography ==
Historical population
Year	Pop.	±%
1821	3,684	—
1831	4,295	+16.6%
1841	4,569	+6.4%
1851	4,817	+5.4%
1861	5,375	+11.6%
1871	5,103	−5.1%
1881	4,787	−6.2%
1891	5,323	+11.2%
1901	4,500	−15.5%
1911	5,539	+23.1%
1926	5,293	−4.4%
1936	5,237	−1.1%
1946	5,445	+4.0%
1951	5,643	+3.6%
1956	7,488	+32.7%
1961	7,442	−0.6%
1966	7,943	+6.7%
1971	9,245	+16.4%
1981	11,703	+26.6%
1986	12,127	+3.6%
1991	11,867	−2.1%
1996	12,492	+5.3%
2002	15,621	+25.0%
2006	18,416	+17.9%
2011	20,103	+9.2%
2016	20,928	+4.1%
2022	22,667	+8.3%

Mullingar is the twentieth largest urban area within the Republic of Ireland, and the third largest town in the Midlands region (after Portlaoise and Athlone), with a population of 22,667 as of the 2022 census. Mullingar is also the fastest growing urban area in the Midlands region, with a population increase of 1,739 (8.3%) from the 2016 census.

According to the 2022 census, 75.8% of the usual resident population of Mullingar were born in Ireland, 4.8% in were born in the UK, 3.7% were born in Poland, 1.2% were born in India, and 14.4% were born elsewhere. The population of Mullingar is predominately white. In the 2022 census, 83.7% of the usual resident population of the town identified as white (including 67.5% white Irish, 13.5% other white, and 2.7% Irish traveller), 4.2% identified as Asian, 2.2% identified as Black, 3% identified as Other and 6.9% did not state an answer.

Christianity is the largest religion within Mullingar, with the majority of the population identifying as Roman Catholic as of the 2022 census. However, between the 2016 and 2022 censuses, the proportion of those identifying as Roman Catholic in the town declined from 80.4% to 68.4%, alongside a rise in those reporting "No religion" from 6.9% to 11.5%.

=== Population statistics ===
Population by birthplace

Location	2011	2016	2022
Republic of Ireland	7,146	16,093	17,024
UK	495	1,097	1,087
Poland	478	864	839
Lithuania	391	689	(Note: Data not specified in CSO report for Census 2022.)
India	(Note: Data not specified in CSO report for Census 2011.)	(Note: Data not specified in CSO report for Census 2016.)	275
Rest of EU	341	768	1,559
Rest of World	472	1,279	1,686
Total	9,323	20,790	22,470

Population by ethnic or cultural background

Ethnicity or culture	2011	2016	2022
White Irish	6,896	15,213	15,169
White Irish Traveller	283	571	606
Other White	1,475	3,043	3,039
Black or Black Irish	179	487	486
Asian or Asian Irish	200	539	933
Other	101	371	680
Not stated	189	566	1,557
Total	9,323	20,790	22,470

Population by religion

Religion	2011	2016	2022
Roman Catholic	8,054	16,820	15,514
Other stated religions	811	2,225	2,671
No religion	411	1,434	2,612
Not stated	138	449	1,870
Total	9,414	20,928	22,667

== Local government and politics ==
Westmeath County Council is the local authority for Westmeath. The county council comprises two constituencies or "municipal districts". Mullingar town is in the Mullingar Municipal District, which comprises thirteen members.

The town is part of the Longford–Westmeath constituency for elections to Dáil Éireann.

Mullingar's Ruth Illingworth, a local historian and Fine Gael politician, was Ireland's first female openly LGBTQ+ mayor, elected in 2009.

There is a Chamber of Commerce in Mullingar, and Mullingar is one of the three towns that forms the Midlands Gateway region, along with Athlone and Tullamore, set up as part of the Government's National Spatial Strategy 2002–2020.

== Tourism ==
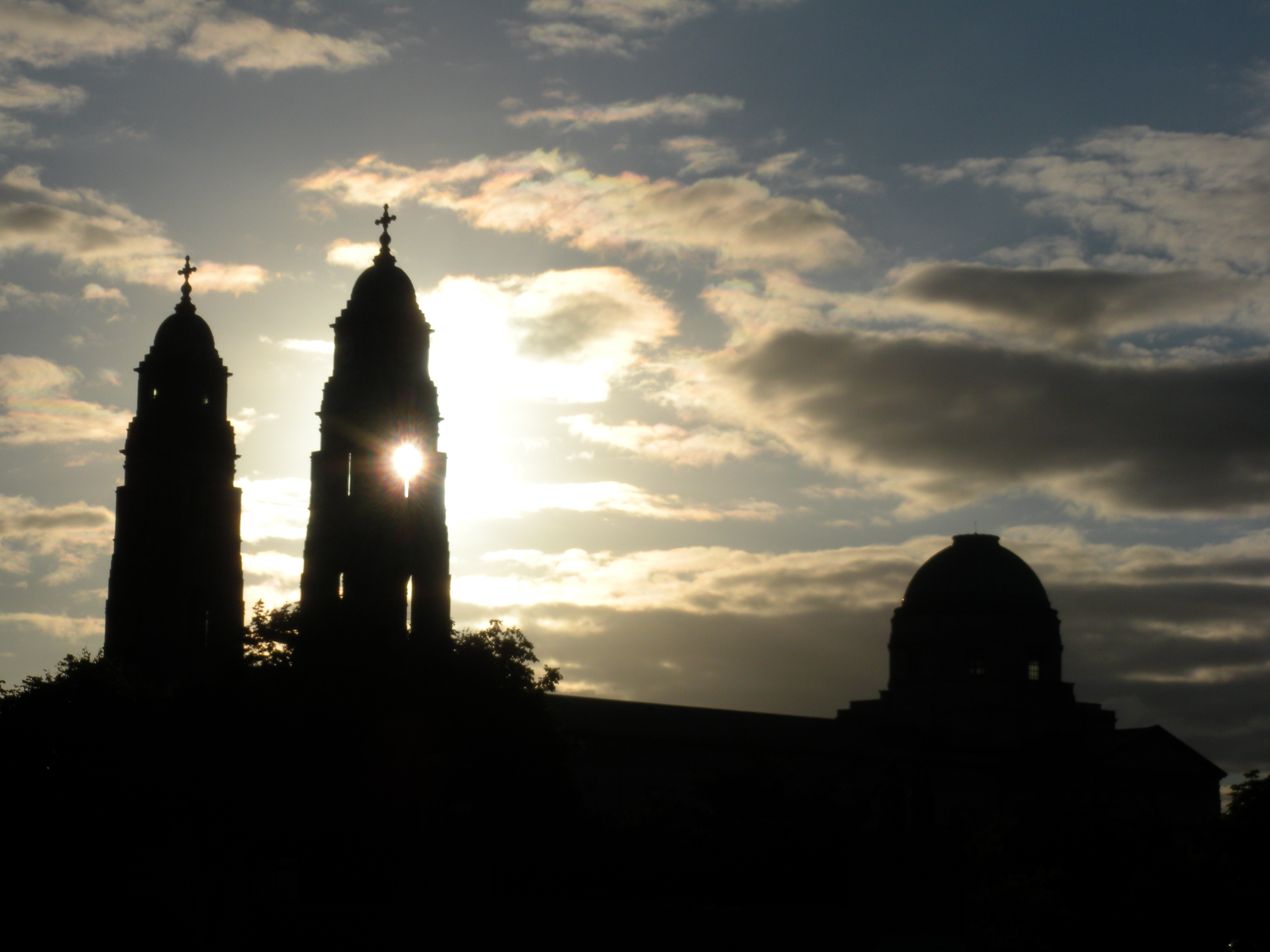
Christ the King Cathedral at sunset

Mullingar's tourist attractions include its lakes – Lough Owel, Lough Derravaragh and Lough Ennell – which are visited by anglers. The Royal Canal also flows through the town. Belvedere House and Gardens, Mullingar Golf Club and the Bloomfield House Hotel are all located nearby.

The town has a handful of hotels, including the Newbury Hotel, Annebrook House Hotel, Mullingar Park Hotel and the Greville Arms Hotel. The latter holds the two Brit awards presented to Niall Horan in 2012 and 2013, and the Greville Monument, a large granite drinking fountain which formerly stood at Dominick Street until the 1920s, which was presented to the town by Lord Greville in 1909.

One of Mullingar's notable buildings is the cathedral of Christ the King Mullingar, the cathedral of the Diocese of Meath. The cathedral was dedicated on the day World War II broke out.

Columb Barracks, which closed in March 2012, was a military base that housed the 4th Field Artillery Regiment, the 4th Field Supply & Transport Company and the HQ of the 54 Reserve Field Artillery Regiment (Army Reserve).

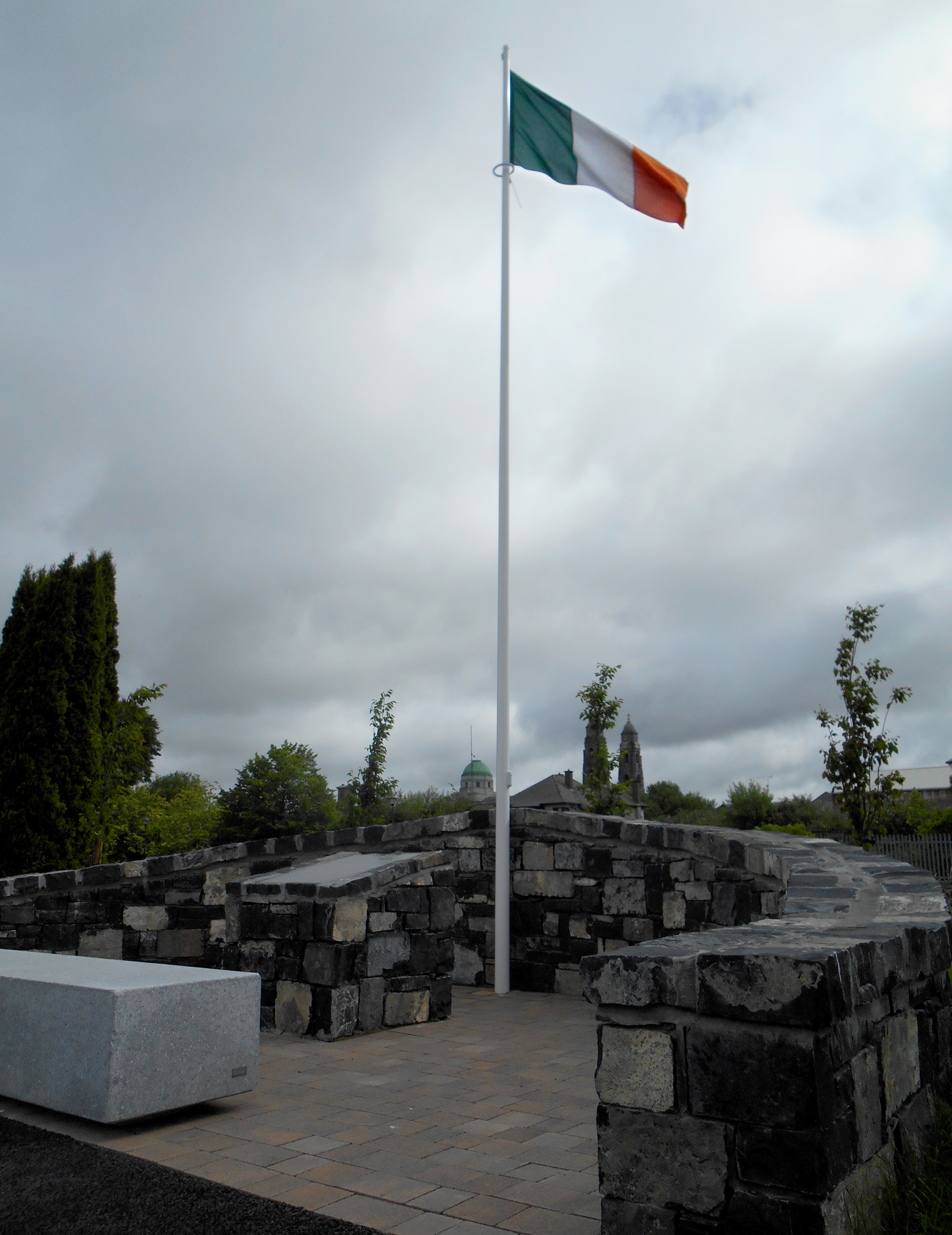
1916 monument

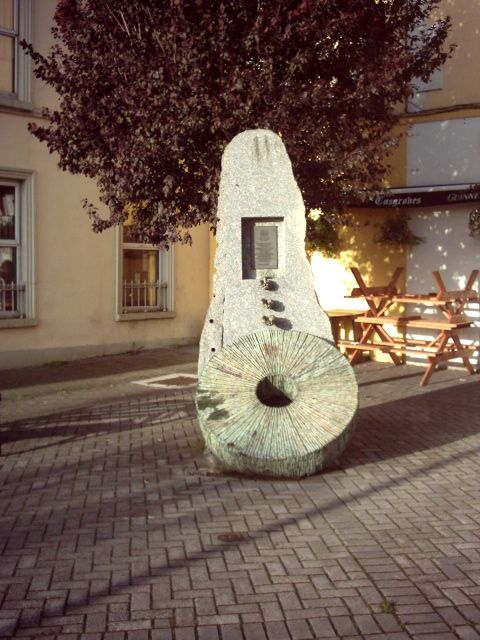
The Famine Memorial Fountain and a millstone, recalling the origin of the town's name

There is a monument, commemorating the centenary of the 1916 Easter Rising, at Green Bridge in Mullingar. The monument, built by the Mullingar Tidy Towns organisation, was officially unveiled on Easter Monday 2017. Other memorials and statues in Mullingar include a statue titled "The Pilgrims" (erected to commemorate the millennium in 2000 at the junction of Austin Friars Street and MacCurtain Street), a memorial to the Great Famine (erected in 1997 on The Square in Mullingar), and a statue of Joe Dolan (unveiled in 2008 on the Market Square).

Mullingar Town Park is a public park situated in the centre of the town, and it includes a wide variety of playgrounds, a swimming pool and a large pond near the centre. On 22 July 2016, the park became one of 22 public spaces in Ireland to be awarded a Green Flag.

== Economy ==
Among Mullingar's exports are items of pewterware produced by Mullingar Pewter. Genesis Fine Art and Mindy Brownes Interiors, a wholesale business which produces bronze gift items and furniture, is based in Mullingar.

Mullingar's commercial sector, as of the 2020s, contains a mix of retail and food services on the town's main thoroughfares – Dominic Street, Oliver Plunkett Street, Mount Street, Castle Street and Pearse Street.

The town has two shopping centres. Harbour Place Shopping Centre, opened in 1997, is anchored by Dunnes Stores. Fairgreen Shopping Centre, opened in 2005, is also located in the town, and has a number of retail outlets including JD Sports, Penneys and TK Maxx.

The town also has a credit union, Mullingar Credit Union (formerly known as St. Colman's House).

A proposed development, named "Mullingar Central", was to have been located between Mount Street, the railway station and Blackhall Street. Planning permission was granted for retail, commercial and residential units. Phase 1, which included tax offices, library, civic offices and County Council buildings was officially opened on 11 June 2009. Phase 2, however, did not proceed.

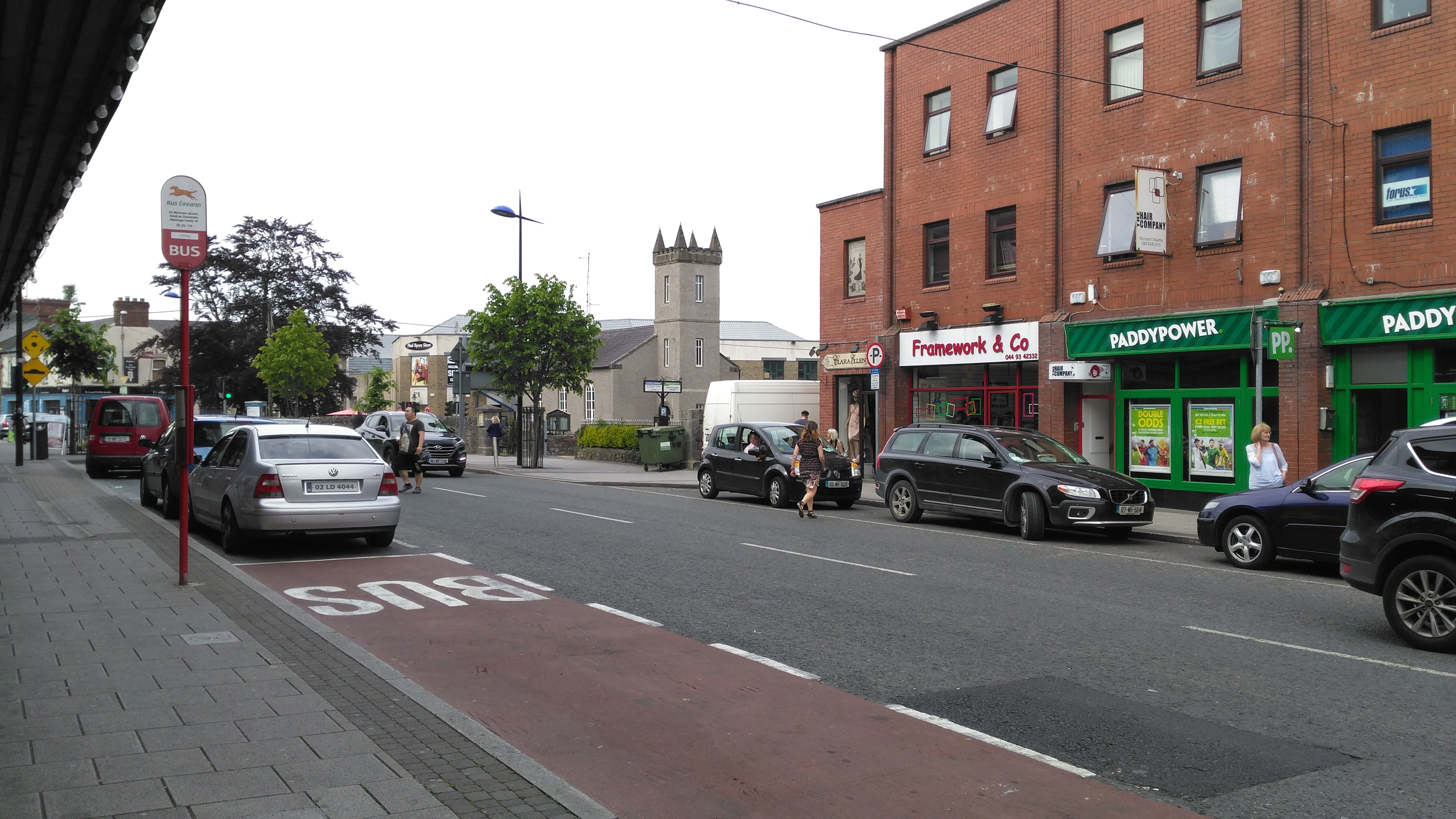
Castle Street is one of the town's high streets

Mullingar contains several industrial estates and business parks. As of 2015, only one plot on the Industrial Development Authority (IDA) business park in Marlinstown has been acquired by an employer, Patterson Pumps. At that time, the business was constructing a new plant to which it intended to move its Irish operation from its current location at Mullingar Business Park. Two of the town's manufacturing plants, Tarkett and Penn Racquet Sports, closed in the late 1990s and early 2000s respectively, causing many job losses. Other local employers include the Midland Regional Hospital at Mullingar, P.E.M. Engineering, Trend Technologies, Taconic International, and Mullingar Pewter.

The town is home to a €80m Lidl warehouse and distribution centre.

Mullingar has a Chamber of Commerce which represents almost 200 businesses from varying commercial sectors.

== Transport ==
=== Road ===
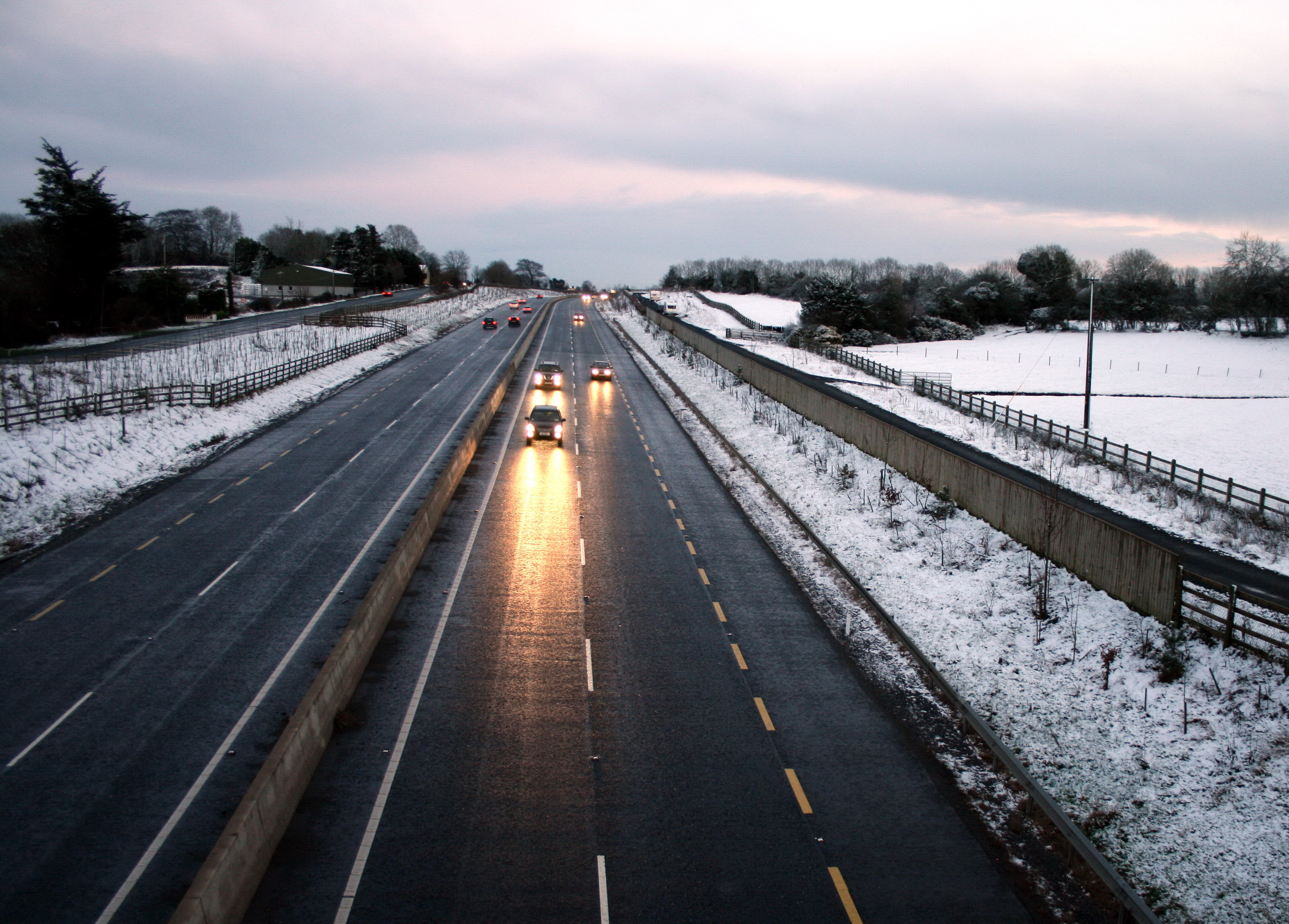
The N4 between Kinnegad and Mullingar in 2008

Mullingar lies near the national primary route N4, the main Dublin – Sligo road, 79 km (49 mi) from the capital. The N52 also connects Mullingar to the Galway-Dublin M6 motorway at Athlone to the southwest, and Kells, Ardee and Dundalk to the northeast.

The N4 Mullingar to Longford (Roosky) project is a road improvement scheme which aims to upgrade a 52 km single carriagway section of the N4 between bypasses at Mullingar and Roosky, with construction anticipated to commence by 2030.

=== Bus ===
Bus Éireann operates a number of routes which serve the town. These include Expressway route 23 (Dublin to Sligo). Other services include routes 70 (Athlone to Mullingar), 115 (Dublin to Mullingar via Enfield), 115C (Kilcock to Mullingar via Ballivor), 115X (Dublin to Mullingar via M4), 167 (Dundalk to Mullingar via Ardee and Kells) and 190 (Drogheda to Athlone via Mullingar).

In February 2026, the National Transport Authority launched two local bus routes serving the Mullingar Business Park and Lough Sheever Corporate Park in Mullingar.

In March 2026, it was announced that Bus Éireann routes 447 and 448 (Finnea and Shandonagh to Mullingar respectively) would be replaced with two TFI Local Link services.

=== Waterway ===
The Royal Canal at Mullingar

The Royal Canal from Dublin to Cloondara opened in stages from 1790–1817, arriving in Mullingar in 1806. The town was served by the canal in the 19th century – however, due to displacement by the construction of railways, commercial use for the transport of goods or people had declined significantly by the 20th century. The navigation of the canal was closed by Coras Iompair Éireann in 1961. The Royal Canal Greenway, a 130 km greenway along the canal, was launched in 2021 following the reopening of the canal to navigation in 2010.

Mullingar is also linked to Lough Ennell via Lacy's Canal and the River Brosna.

=== Railways ===
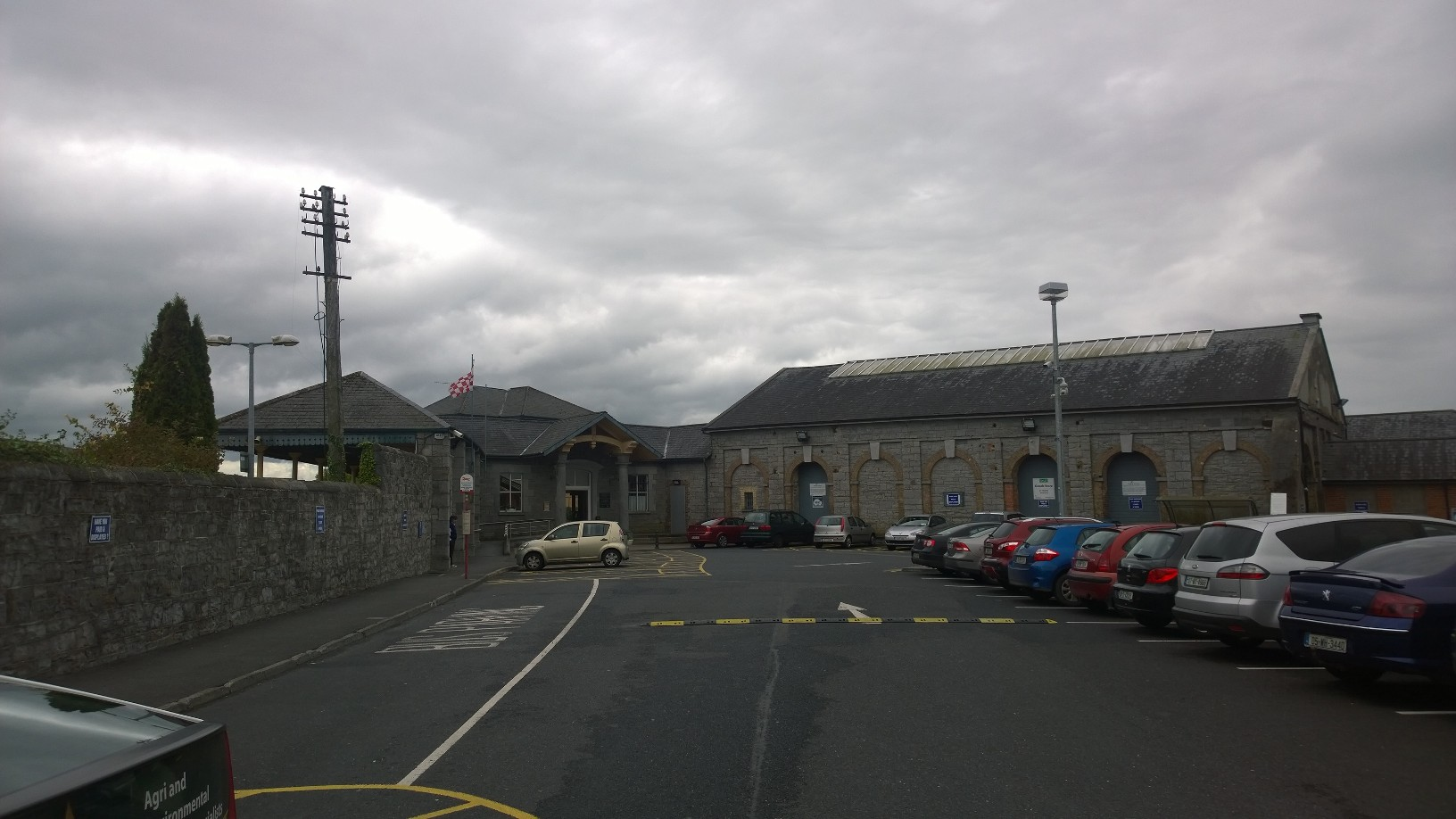
Mullingar railway station and carpark

The Midland Great Western Railway line to Mullingar from Dublin opened in stages from 1846 to 1848, arriving in Mullingar on 2 October 1848. The original mainline ran from Dublin (Broadstone Station) to Galway via Mullingar, then via Moate to Athlone, the Mullingar to Galway section opening in August 1851. A branch line to Longford was opened by 8 November 1855, and was extended further to Sligo by 1863.

The line between Mullingar and Athlone closed to passenger traffic in 1987. The Old Rail Trail, a 43 kilometre greenway linking the River Shannon in Athlone to the Royal Canal in Mullingar over the disused rail line, was opened in 2015.

Currently, the Dublin-Sligo railway line northwest to Longford and Sligo is the mainline. Galway is accessed from Heuston Station via Portarlington. Mullingar station is served by national rail company Iarnród Éireann's commuter services to/from Dublin and InterCity trains to/from Sligo.

== Healthcare ==
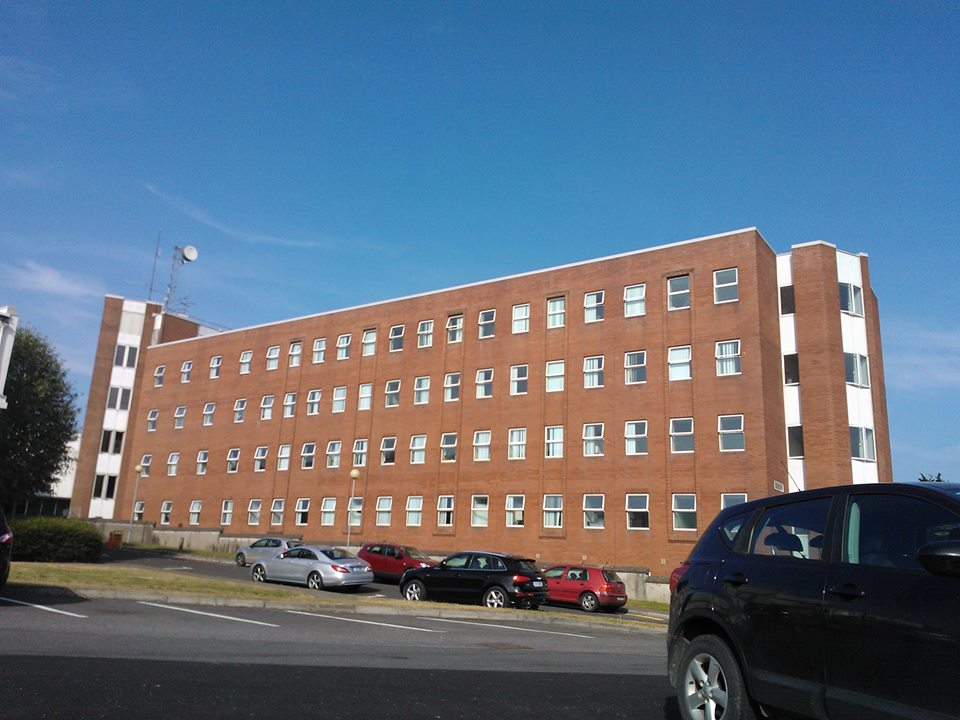
Midland Regional Hospital, Mullingar

The Midland Regional Hospital at Mullingar opened in 1936 and serves the Longford-Westmeath area. Two extensions were built in 1988 and from 1993–1994. There are several other hospitals in the town. These include St Loman's, a former psychiatric hospital until its closure 2013; St Mary's, an elderly care centre originally established as a workhouse in 1841; and Charter Medical Private Hosptial (formerly known as St. Francis Private Hosptial until 2020).

== Education ==
The town has several primary schools, including a number run under the Catholic ethos, a Church of Ireland school, a non-denominational Educate Together primary school, and two Irish language primary schools.

The town has four secondary schools. These include Coláiste Mhuire, St. Finian's College, Loreto College and Mullingar Community College.

Coláiste Mhuire, established in 1856, is an all-boys school, however, the repeat Leaving Certificate class is co-educational.

St. Finian's College is a diocesan school of the Diocese of Meath, and was founded in Navan in 1802. The site of the school was transferred to Mullingar and formally opened in 1908. St Finian's was an all-boys boarding school; however, in 2003, the decision was made to phase out the boarding school by 2007, and to admit girls as well as boys.

Loreto College is a Catholic all-girls school and was established in 1881.

Mullingar Community College is a co-educational, multi-demoninational school which operates under the auspices of the Longford and Westmeath Education and Training Board (LWETB). The LWETB are responsible for managing the provision of further education and training at the school.

== Culture ==
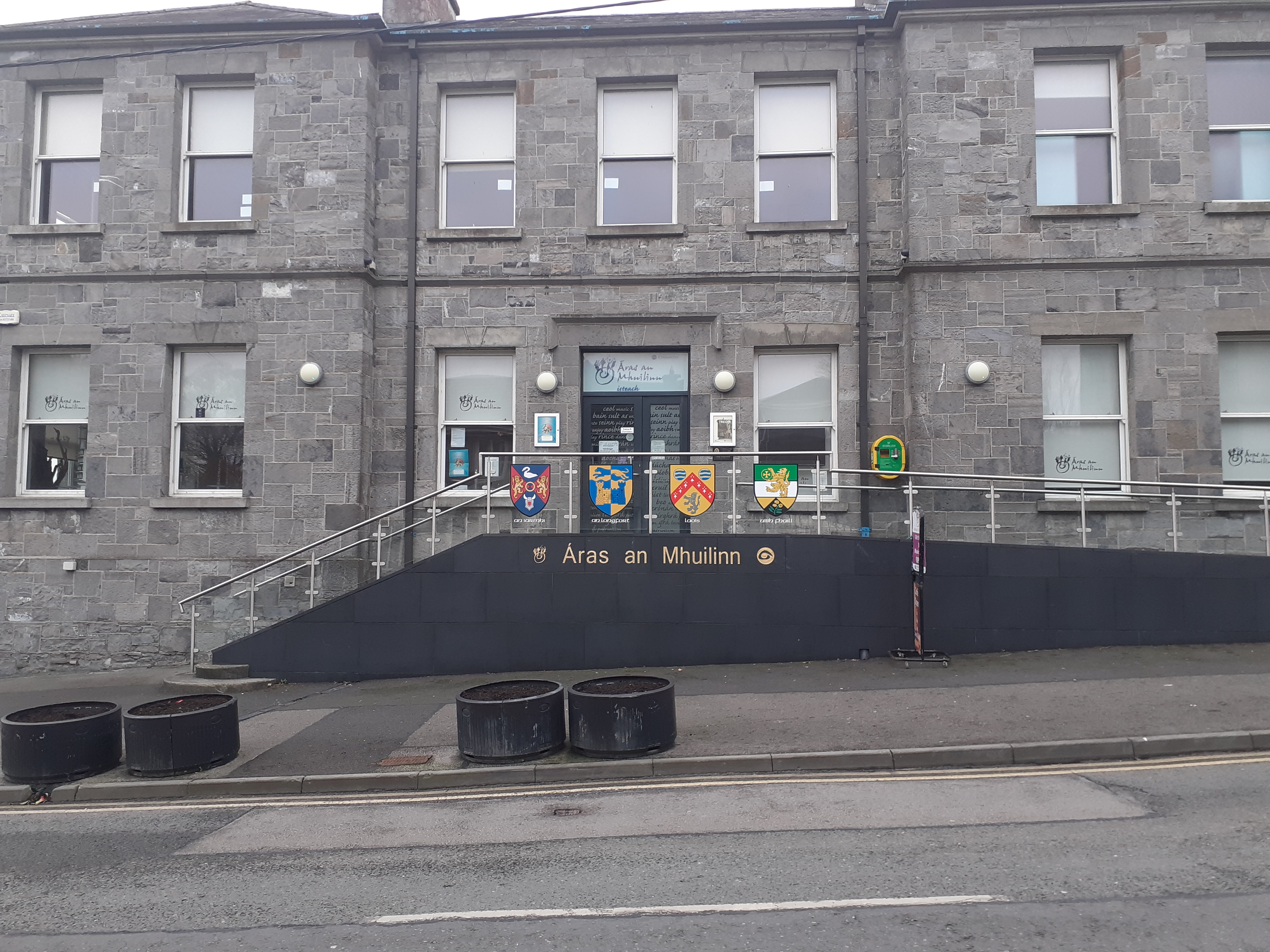
Áras an Mhuilinn, the Regional Resource Centre of Comhaltas Ceoltóirí Éireann in the Midlands, is based on Mount Street

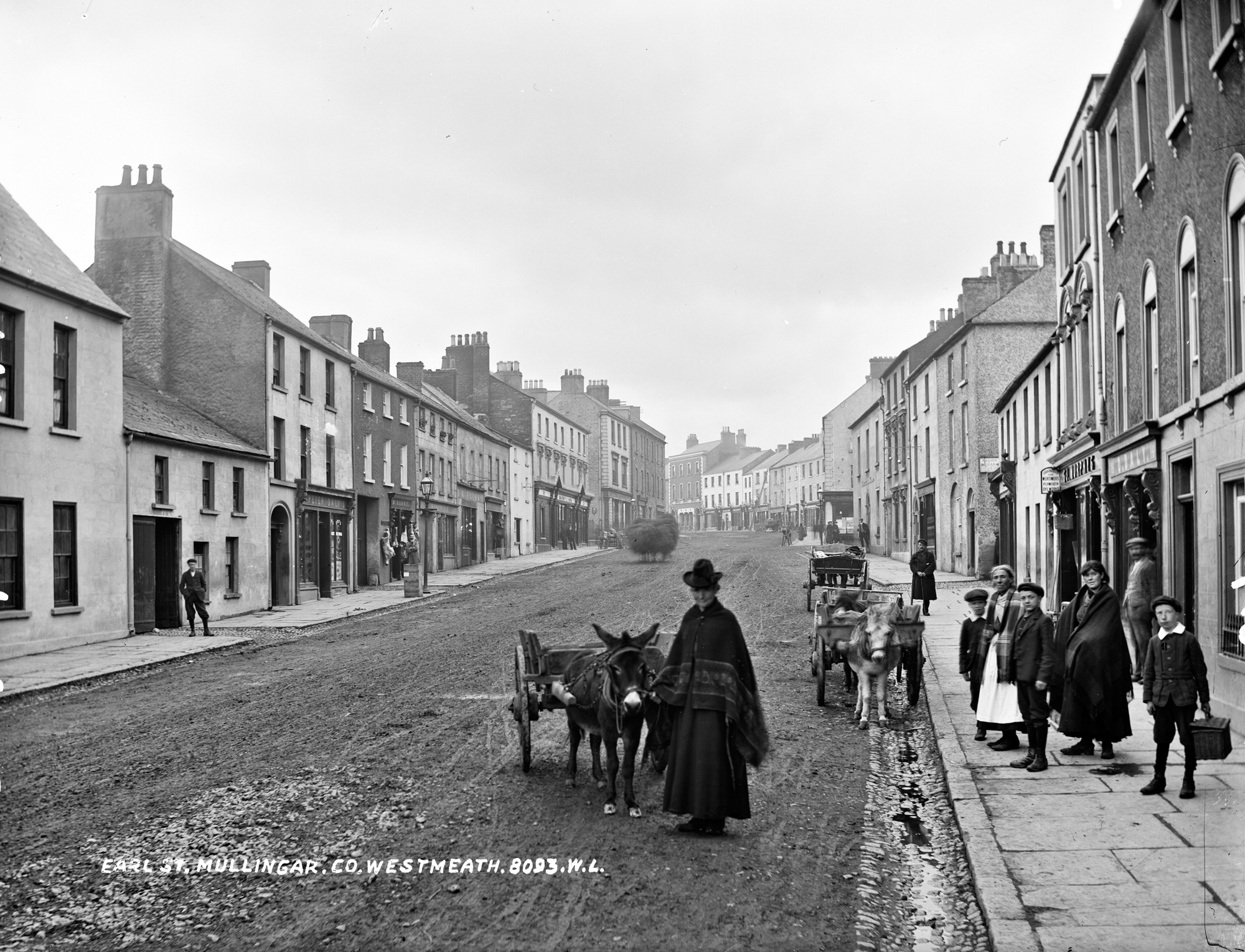
Earl Street, Mullingar, in the late 19th century

=== Media ===
Two print newspapers serve the community: the Westmeath Examiner and the Westmeath Topic.

Mullingar is served by the regional radio station Midlands 103 on 96.5 FM.

=== Music ===
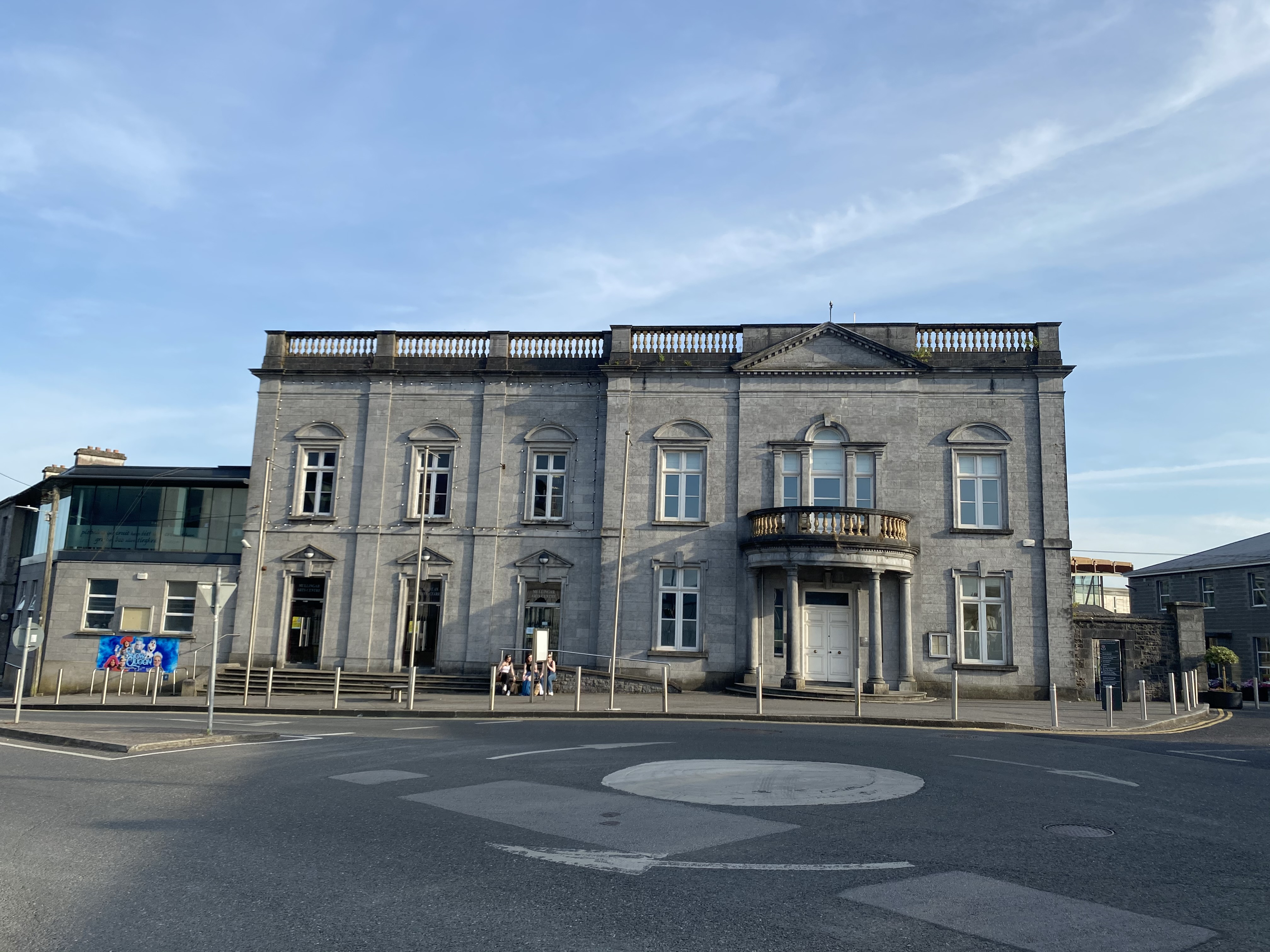
Mullingar Arts Centre

The Mullingar Town Band was founded in 1879 by Father Polland as a Holy Family Confraternity Band. The local military barracks supplied some of the early members, who themselves were serving members of the British Regimental bands stationed in Mullingar. The Mullingar Confraternity Band remained under the auspices of the Confraternity until the 1940s, when it was handed over to a committee and continued under the title of Mullingar Brass and Reed Band. The band has a dual role as a concert band and a marching band (the latter known as the Celtic Crusaders). In 2017, the Celtic Crusaders won the Irish Marching Band Association League.

Comhaltas Ceoltóirí Éireann, the primary Irish performing arts organisation, was founded in the town in 1951. The first ever Fleadh Cheoil was held in that same year by Comhaltas in the town.

First opened in 1989, "The Stables" is a music venue in Mullingar, which critic and writer Ronan Casey described as an "essential" stop for national touring acts.

Niall Horan, born and raised in Mullingar, is a former member of the boy band One Direction. Horan has won seven Brit Awards and four MTV Video Music Awards with One Direction. Niall Breslin, from the band The Blizzards, is also from Mullingar. Mullingar native Tanya O'Callaghan is the bass player with the band Whitesnake. O'Callaghan was also bassist for solo projects for Iron Maiden singer Bruce Dickinson, and solo projects for Twisted Sister singer Dee Snider.

Live venues include the Mullingar Arts Centre.

In 1951, 1963, 2022 and 2023 Mullingar hosted the Fleadh Cheoil.

=== In popular culture ===
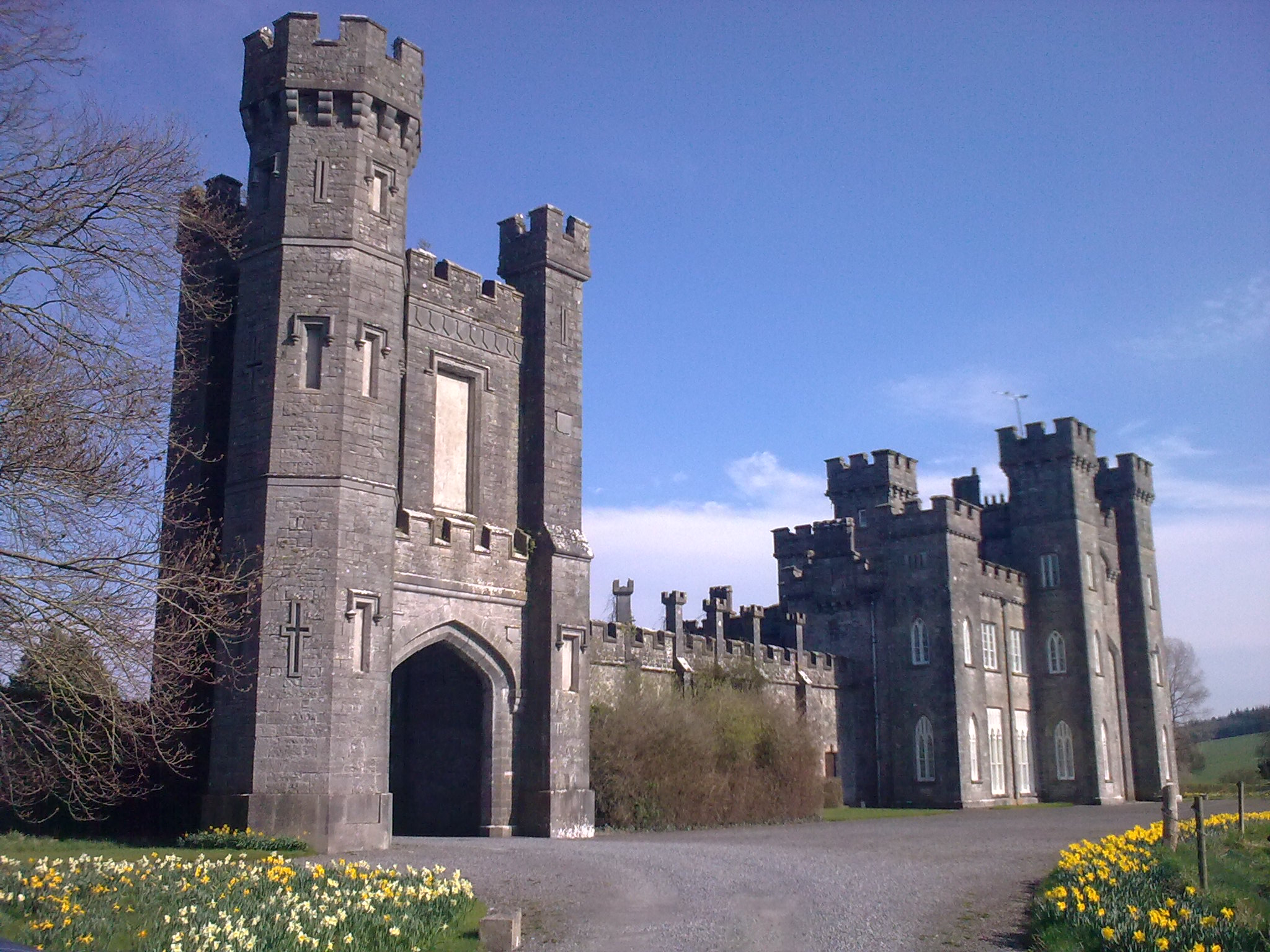
Knockdrin Castle lies outside Mullingar town

The town is mentioned in a number of songs, including "The Reason I Left Mullingar" (written in 1980 and sung by The Furey Brothers), "Ode in Praise of The City of Mullingar" (written by William J Macquorn Rankine), "The Rocky Road to Dublin" (by The Dubliners), and Pat of Mullingar (an Irish rebel song). Mullingar is also mentioned towards the end of the song "Horse Outside" by the Rubberbandits.

Mullingar is also associated with Irish author James Joyce, who was an occasional visitor to Mullingar during his youth. Joyce's father, John, was a civil servant posted from Dublin to compile an electoral register of Mullingar and the surrounding townlands. He often stayed in the Greville Arms Hotel. James referred to Mullingar in three of his novels, mentioning it twelve times in Ulysses, in chapter 14 of Stephen Hero, and three times in Finnegans Wake. (Note: Mullingar appears in Ulysses in the Calypso episode; in Lotus Eaters; twice in Hades; in Lestrygonians; in Nausicaa; twice in Oxen of the Sun; in Circe; in Eumaeus; and twice in Ithaca. The town is also mentioned three times in Finnegans Wake in Book 1, Section 6, page 138, line 19; in Book 2, Section 2, page 286, line 21; and in Book 2, Section 3, page 345, line 34. Mullingar does not appear in Dubliners nor in A Portrait of the Artist as a Young Man.)

Mullingar featured on Three Men in a Boat on BBC 2 in December 2009, in an episode called "Three Men Go to Ireland". Dara Ó Briain, Rory McGrath and Griff Rhys Jones visited Mullingar Greyhound Stadium during the episode. In Doubt, a 2008 film adaptation of the John Patrick Shanley stage play, the town is referenced in a dialogue between the main character and the school caretaker.

Outside Mullingar, a play by John Patrick Shanley, starred Will and Grace star Debra Messing.

== Sport ==
=== GAA ===
There are several Gaelic Athletic Association football clubs in the Mullingar area: Mullingar Shamrocks, St. Loman's Mullingar, The Downs, and Shandonagh. St Oliver Plunkett's and Cullion play hurling. Westmeath GAA county team plays football and hurling at its home games at Cusack Park.

=== Football ===
Mullingar has three adult football teams; Mullingar Athletic (who play in Gainstown), Mullingar Town (who have their grounds in D'Alton Park), and Mullingar Celtic FC (who play their home games in the Raithin community pitch).

=== Tennis and badminton ===
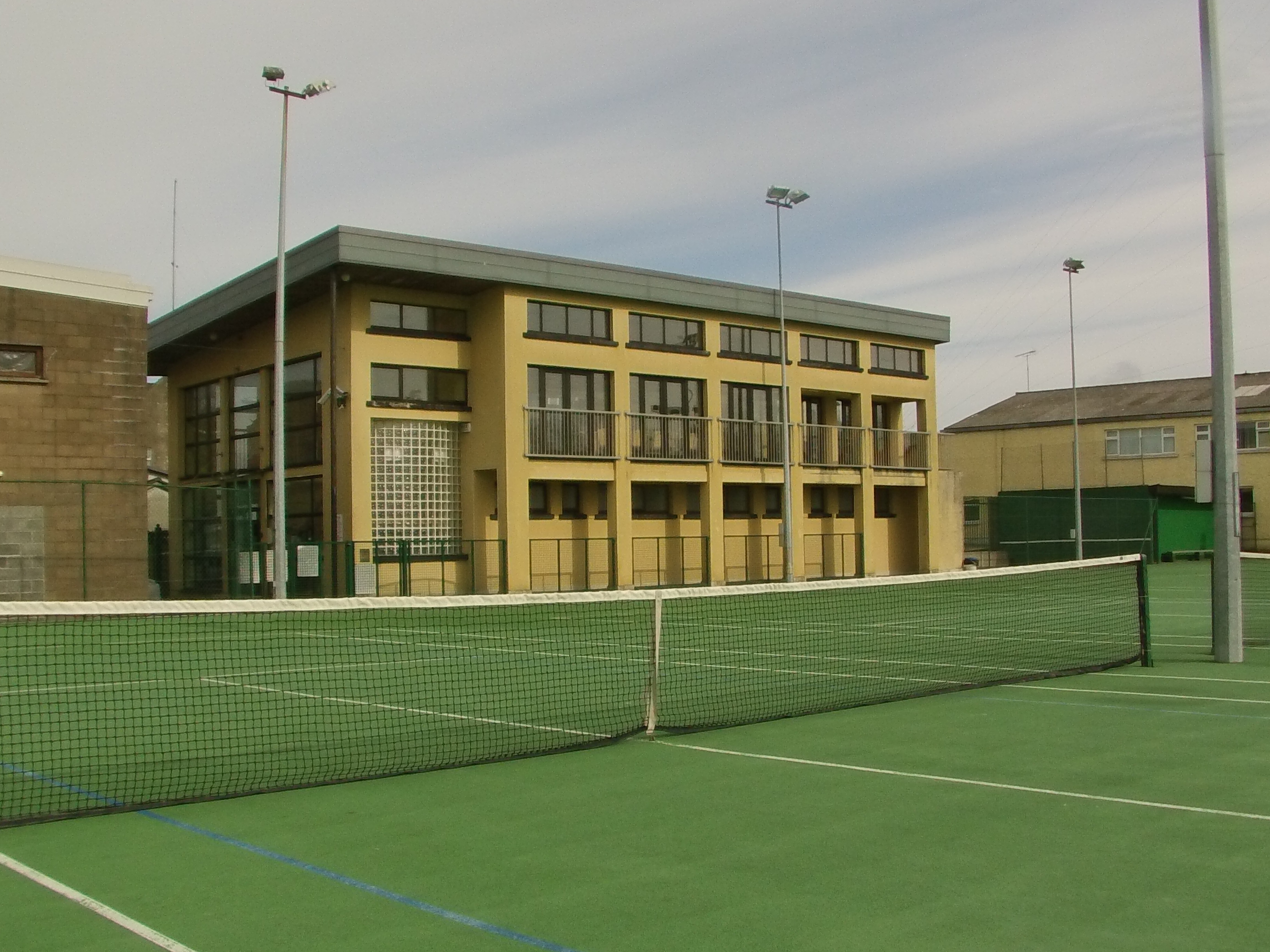
Tennis clubhouse and courts

The facilities of the Mullingar Tennis and Badminton Club include eight outdoor tennis courts and a hall containing two badminton courts. The Mullingar Town Tennis Club was founded in 1939 by members of the Uisneach Badminton Club.

=== Greyhound racing ===
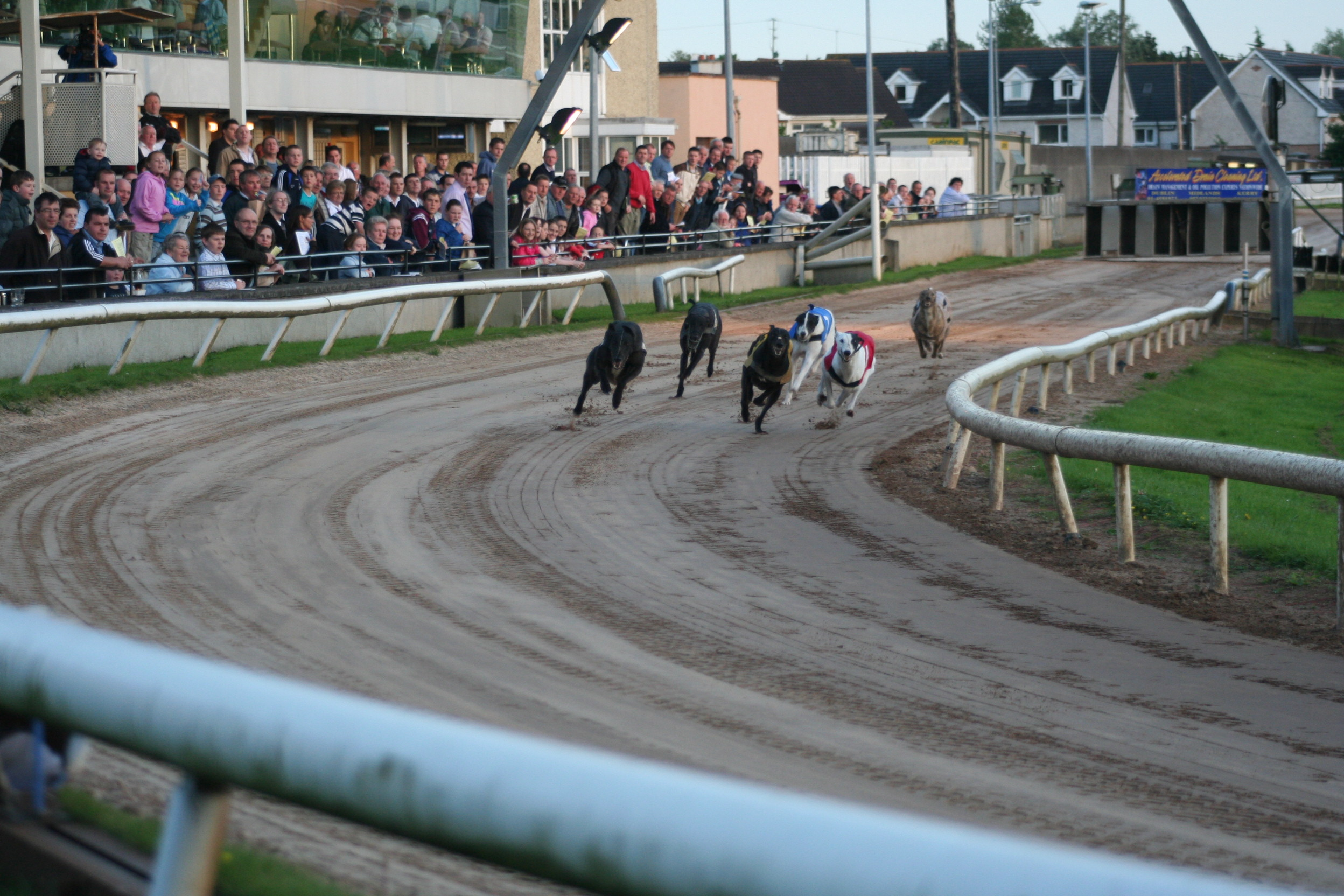
Greyhound Track, Mullingar

Mullingar Greyhound Stadium is located at Ballinderry, in the south of the town. Greyhound racing occurs on Saturday from 7:50pm. The track featured on the BBC "Three Men Go to Ireland" show where Dara Ó Briain's dog Snip Nua raced.

=== Golf ===
Mullingar Golf Club (originally known as Westmeath Golf Club) was founded in 1894. It has been situated at Belvedere House and Gardens since 1937.

The club hosts an annual competition, the Mullingar Scratch Cup, every August. This competition has been won by Des Smyth, Pádraig Harrington, Darren Clarke, and Paul McGinley. The 2006 winner was Rory McIlroy.

=== Boxing ===
Two-time Olympian boxer John Joe Nevin is from Mullingar. He won a silver medal in the bantamweight competition at the 2012 Summer Olympics.

=== Hockey ===
Mullingar Hockey Club is based in Loreto College. The women's club was founded in 1978 and the men's club was founded in 1983. The club has two men's teams and one women's team.

=== Other sports ===
Mullingar Rugby Club was founded in 1924. It won the Towns Cup final in 1954 and 1956.

The Mullingar Dragons is a local basketball team. The team competed in the North-Eastern Basketball League in 2009.

The Westmeath Minotaurs American football club (formed in 2011) plays their games at the Mullingar Rugby Club. They compete as a member of American Football Ireland.

Mullingar Equestrian Centre, outside the town, hosts competitions and offers lessons. Other schools in the area include Ladestown House Riding Stables and Catherinestown Riding School. Studs include Tally Ho Stud, Cleaboy Stud, and Charlestown Stud.

Other sports clubs in the area include the Midland Tigers Australian Rules Football team, Lakeside Wheelers Mullingar Cycling club (which is affiliated to Cycling Ireland), and the Mullingar Harbour Canoe Polo Club (based on the Royal Canal).

== People ==
- John Alexander, Victoria Cross recipient
- Niamh Algar, actor
- Niall Breslin (Bressie) and The Blizzards, musicians
- Eugene Casserly, U.S. Senator from California, was born in Mullingar
- Breon Corcoran, chief executive officer (CEO) of Betfair
- Joe Dolan, singer
- J. P. Donleavy, New York-born author who lived for a time at Levington Park near Mullingar
- Wellington Guernsey, 19th-century composer and writer
- Josephine Hart, Baroness Saatchi, author and wife of Lord Saatchi
- Niall Horan, singer-songwriter and former member of One Direction
- Thomas Kavanagh, recipient of the Victoria Cross
- Aidan Keena, footballer
- Tina Kellegher, actress
- Shane Lowry, golfer who was born in Mullingar and grew up in Clara, County Offaly
- Terry McMahon, actor, writer and filmmaker
- Joseph Murphy, Irish equestrian Olympian 2012
- John Joe Nevin, boxer
- Michael O'Leary, CEO of Ryanair
- Declan Power, defence and security analyst and author
- Connor Smith, footballer for Yeovil Town, defender
- Ailish Tynan (born 1975), operatic soprano

== Climate ==
The climate in this area has mild differences between highs and lows, and there is adequate rainfall year-round. The Köppen Climate Classification subtype for this climate is "Cfb" (Marine West Coast Climate/Oceanic climate). With a yearly mean of 9.3 degrees Celsius, Mullingar is the coldest place in Ireland.

Climate data for Mullingar weather station (WMO identifier: 03971), 100m amsl, 1979–2008, extremes 1943–present
Month	Jan	Feb	Mar	Apr	May	Jun	Jul	Aug	Sep	Oct	Nov	Dec	Year
Record high °C (°F)	13.8 (56.8)	15.4 (59.7)	20.5 (68.9)	22.6 (72.7)	25.5 (77.9)	29.8 (85.6)	30.4 (86.7)	29.5 (85.1)	25.5 (77.9)	22.9 (73.2)	17.3 (63.1)	14.6 (58.3)	30.4 (86.7)
Mean daily maximum °C (°F)	7.4 (45.3)	7.9 (46.2)	9.8 (49.6)	12.1 (53.8)	14.9 (58.8)	17.3 (63.1)	19.2 (66.6)	18.9 (66.0)	16.7 (62.1)	13.2 (55.8)	9.9 (49.8)	7.9 (46.2)	12.9 (55.2)
Daily mean °C (°F)	4.5 (40.1)	4.7 (40.5)	6.3 (43.3)	8.1 (46.6)	10.6 (51.1)	13.2 (55.8)	15.2 (59.4)	14.8 (58.6)	12.8 (55.0)	9.7 (49.5)	6.7 (44.1)	5.0 (41.0)	9.3 (48.7)
Mean daily minimum °C (°F)	1.5 (34.7)	1.5 (34.7)	2.8 (37.0)	4.1 (39.4)	6.3 (43.3)	9.2 (48.6)	11.1 (52.0)	10.8 (51.4)	8.9 (48.0)	6.2 (43.2)	3.5 (38.3)	2.2 (36.0)	5.7 (42.3)
Record low °C (°F)	−14.9 (5.2)	−12.2 (10.0)	−9.2 (15.4)	−4.4 (24.1)	−2.6 (27.3)	0.2 (32.4)	3.4 (38.1)	2.1 (35.8)	−0.1 (31.8)	−4.4 (24.1)	−6.9 (19.6)	−14.1 (6.6)	−14.9 (5.2)
Average precipitation mm (inches)	91.7 (3.61)	72.0 (2.83)	78.3 (3.08)	62.1 (2.44)	68.7 (2.70)	70.5 (2.78)	61.8 (2.43)	80.8 (3.18)	73.8 (2.91)	102.1 (4.02)	82.4 (3.24)	97.1 (3.82)	941.3 (37.06)
Average precipitation days (≥ 0.2 mm)	19	17	20	15	16	16	16	17	17	19	18	19	209
Average snowy days	5.0	4.4	3.5	1.6	0.2	0.0	0.0	0.0	0.0	0.0	0.4	2.7	17.8
Average relative humidity (%)	83.4	77.8	72.8	68.1	67.1	69.1	69.9	70.6	72.1	77.0	82.2	85.9	74.7
Average dew point °C (°F)	3 (37)	3 (37)	3 (37)	5 (41)	7 (45)	10 (50)	12 (54)	11 (52)	10 (50)	8 (46)	5 (41)	3 (37)	7 (44)
Mean monthly sunshine hours	55.8	70.6	99.2	147.0	179.8	150.0	142.6	142.6	117.0	99.2	66.0	49.6	1,319.4
Mean daily sunshine hours	1.8	2.5	3.2	4.9	5.8	5.0	4.6	4.6	3.9	3.2	2.2	1.6	3.6
Source 1: Met Éireann
Source 2: Time and Date (dewpoints, between 2005−2015)

== See also ==
- List of towns and villages in Ireland
- List of market houses in the Republic of Ireland
