= Trend Technologies =

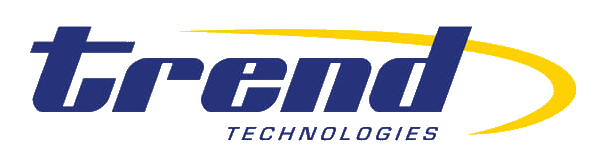
- Formerly: Data Packaging
- Company type: Private
- Industry: Plastic molding
- Founded: 1979; 47 years ago in Chino, California, California, U.S. (Data Packaging); July 21, 1980; 45 years ago (Trend Technologies Europe)
- Founders: Dónal Lawlor; Earl Payton; Brian Dickstein
- Headquarters: 4626 Eucalyptus Avenue; Chino, California, U.S.
- Number of locations: Elk Grove Village, Illinois; Guadalajara, Mexico; Glenrothes, Scotland; Johor Bahru, Malaysia; Joo Koon, Singapore; Chino, California; Mullingar, Ireland; Martin, Slovakia; Suzhou, China; Pune, India
- Number of employees: 1,980 (2016)
- Subsidiaries: Stevenson Grantech Limited; Cam Fran Tool and Die; Tintarent Limited
- Website: trendtechnologies.com

Trend Technologies (formerly called Data Packaging) is an international manufacturer specialising in plastic injection molding with the first facility opening in Mullingar, Ireland in 1985. The company serves the automotive, healthcare, ICT and industrial sectors. The company's subsidiaries are the Cam Fran Tool and Die Company, Stevenson Grantech Limited and Tintarent Limited.

== History and present ==
The company was founded in 1979 as Data Packaging in Chino, California, United States. On July 21, 1980, the European division of the company was registered in Ireland although it is now liquidated, but the parent company still operates in Europe. The company operates ten facilities in nine countries.

=== International facilities ===
Trend Technologies has operations in several countries as detailed in the table below. In September 2016, it was announced that Trend was building a new facility in Pune, India which would increase the current square footage to 80,000 ft^{2} which is expandable to 120,000 ft^{2} in order to add tool building and metal stamping resources.

Country	Location(s) of facilities	Registration and acquisition date (if applicable)	Size of facility (in ft^{2})	Number of employees	Certifications
United States	Chino, California Corporate Headquarters Elk Grove Village, Illinois		160,000 100,000	340 employees combined	ISO 9001:2008 TS 16949 ISO 14001
Mexico	Guadalajara, Jalisco		190,000	450 employees	ISO 9001:2008 TS 16949 ISO 14001
Ireland	Mullingar, County Westmeath European Headquarters	December 13, 1985	75,000	125 employees	ISO 9001:2008 ISO 14001 ISO 13485
Scotland	Glenrothes, Fife	Registered on February 18, 2004 Acquisition by the company on January 5, 2016	48,000	100 employees	ISO 9001:2008
Slovakia	Martin, Turiec		54,000	80 employees	ISO 9001:2008 TS 16949 ISO 14001
India	Pune, Maharashtra	November 17, 2006	80,000 (expandable up to 120,000)	100 employees	ISO 9001:2008 TS 16949
Malaysia	Johor Bahru, Johor		278,000	350 employees	ISO 9001:2008 ISO 14001 ISO 13485
China	Suzhou, Jiangsu		68,000	100 employees	ISO 9001:2008 ISO 14001
Singapore	Joo Koon, West Region		112,000 combined	335 employees	ISO 9001:2008 TS 16949 ISO 14001 ISO 13485
