= Lough Ennell =

Lake in County Westmeath, Ireland

- Loch Ainninn (Irish)
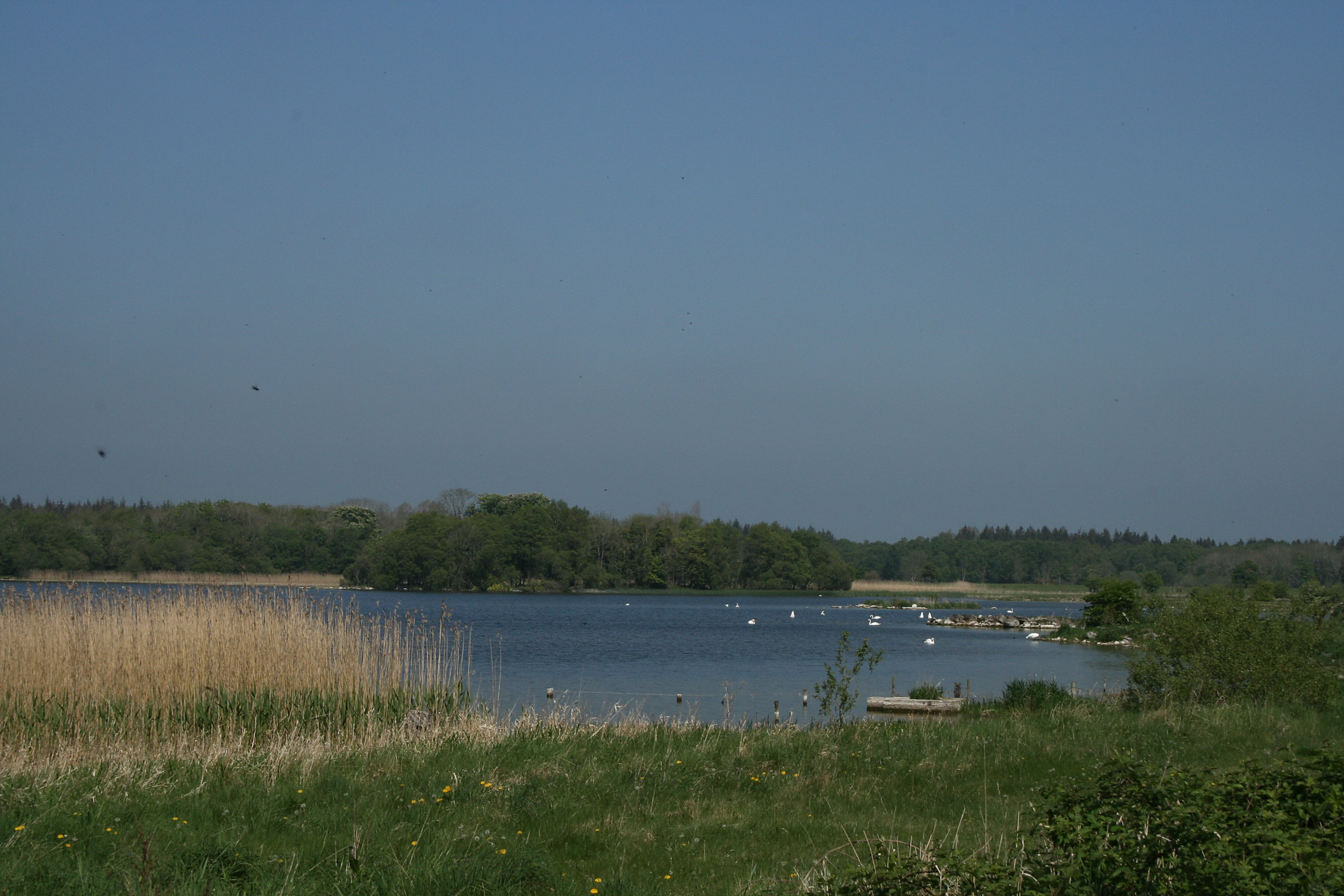
- Looking northwest

- Location in Ireland

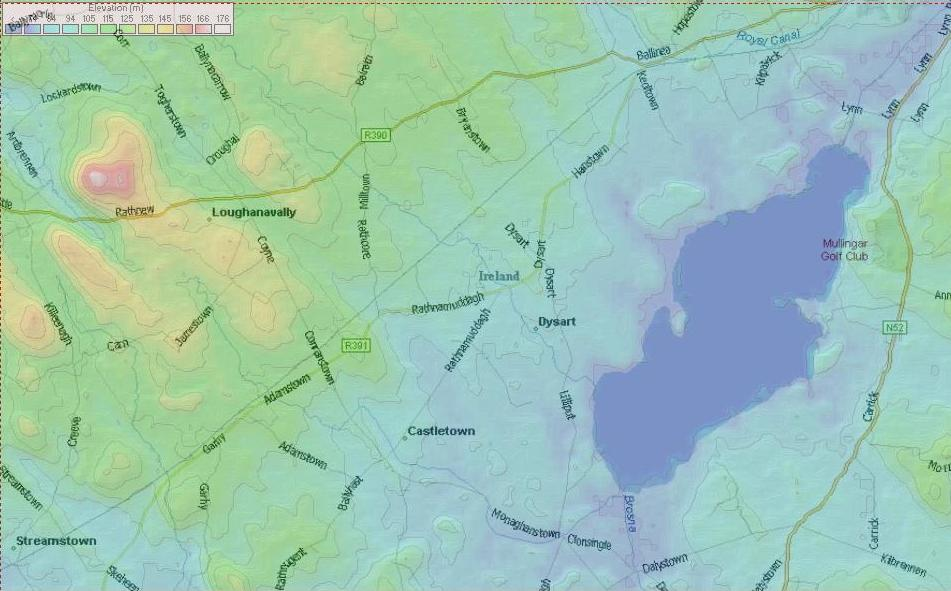
- Location: Westmeath
- Coordinates: 53°27′N 7°25′W
- Lake type: glacial lake
- Primary inflows: River Brosna
- Primary outflows: River Brosna
- Catchment area: 117.62 km^{2} (45.41 sq mi)
- Basin countries: Ireland
- Max. length: 6.5 km (4.0 mi)
- Max. width: 2 km (1.2 mi)
- Surface area: 11.56 km^{2} (4.46 sq mi)
- Max. depth: 30 m (98 ft)
- Surface elevation: 81 m (266 ft)

Ramsar Wetland
- Designated: 7 June 1996
- Reference no.: 848

Lough Ennell (Irish: Loch Ainninn) is a lake near the town of Mullingar, County Westmeath, Ireland. It is situated beside the N52 road, off the Mullingar/Kilbeggan road. The lake is part of the Lough Ennell Special Protection Area. It is 6.5 km (4.0 mi) long by 2 km (1.2 mi) wide, with an area of about 12 km^{2} (4.6 sq mi). Lough Ennell has a large area of shallow water with nearly two-thirds of its area being less than 25 feet (8 m) and almost half of it being under 10 ft (3.0 m) deep. The lake produced Ireland's largest ever lake brown trout at 26 lbs (11.8 kg).

The main river flowing into Lough Ennell is the River Brosna, which enters on the Mullingar side of the lake and exits on the opposite side at Lilliput. Lilliput and Lilliput House were frequently used by Jonathan Swift as a holiday home and place to write, local tradition states that Jonathan Swift was in a boat on the lake when he looked back at Lilliput and noticed how small the people looked at that distance, hence the inspiration for his most famous book Gulliver's Travels. Lilliput at the time was called "Nure" however after the publication of Gulliver's Travels locals began to refer to the lakeshore as Lilliput, the name stuck and today the area is known as Lilliput.

== Facilities ==
The loughside has a caravan and camping park, boat hire facilities, hotels and restaurants and a fishery. Belvedere House is also an attraction and is managed by the County Council, it hosts a number of sporting and cultural events annually such as concerts and triathlons.

== Angling ==
Lough Ennell fishery is part of the Shannon Regional Fisheries Board's Midland Fisheries Group of managed waters. Brown trout and pike are the main catches. In recent times it appears that stocks of both game and coarse fish in the lake have been declining. There is speculation locally as to the reason for this. In 2019, the Environmental Protection Agency declared the water quality at Lilliput beach on the Lough as "poor".

== Starling murmuration ==
A significant population of starlings overwinter at Lough Ennell, forming large murmurations every evening during the winter months. In recent years this natural phenomenon has garnered much public interest with large crowds of people gathering before dusk to observe the starlings. During the COVID-19 lockdown period in 2020, a locally-based photographer captured an evening murmuration that garnered national and international attention.

== Sport ==
- Westmeath County Council has banned the use of jet skis on the lake. The prohibition came into effect in October 2006 and currently does not apply to speed boats.
- The shores of Lough Ennell host Mullingar Golf Club, the local golf club to the north east of the lake.
- The lake hosts Triathlons at Lilliput and Belvedere.

== Gallery ==
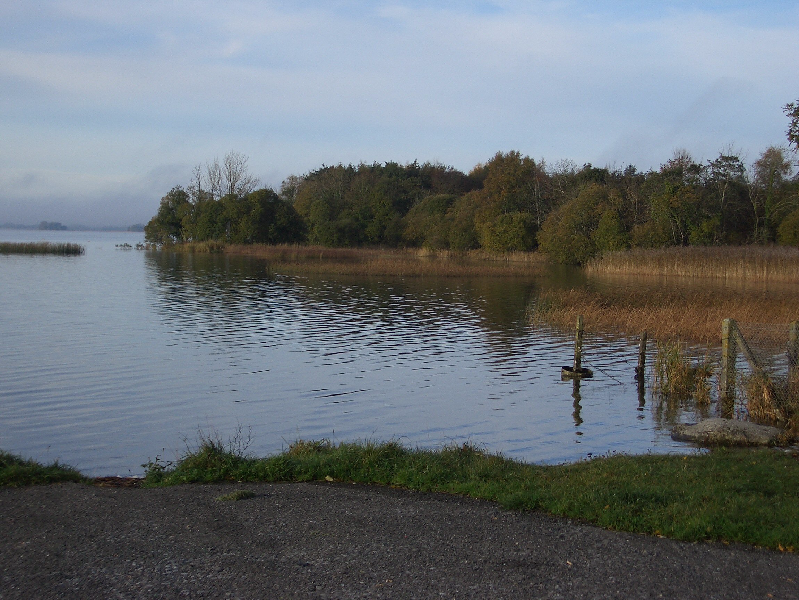
October 2004

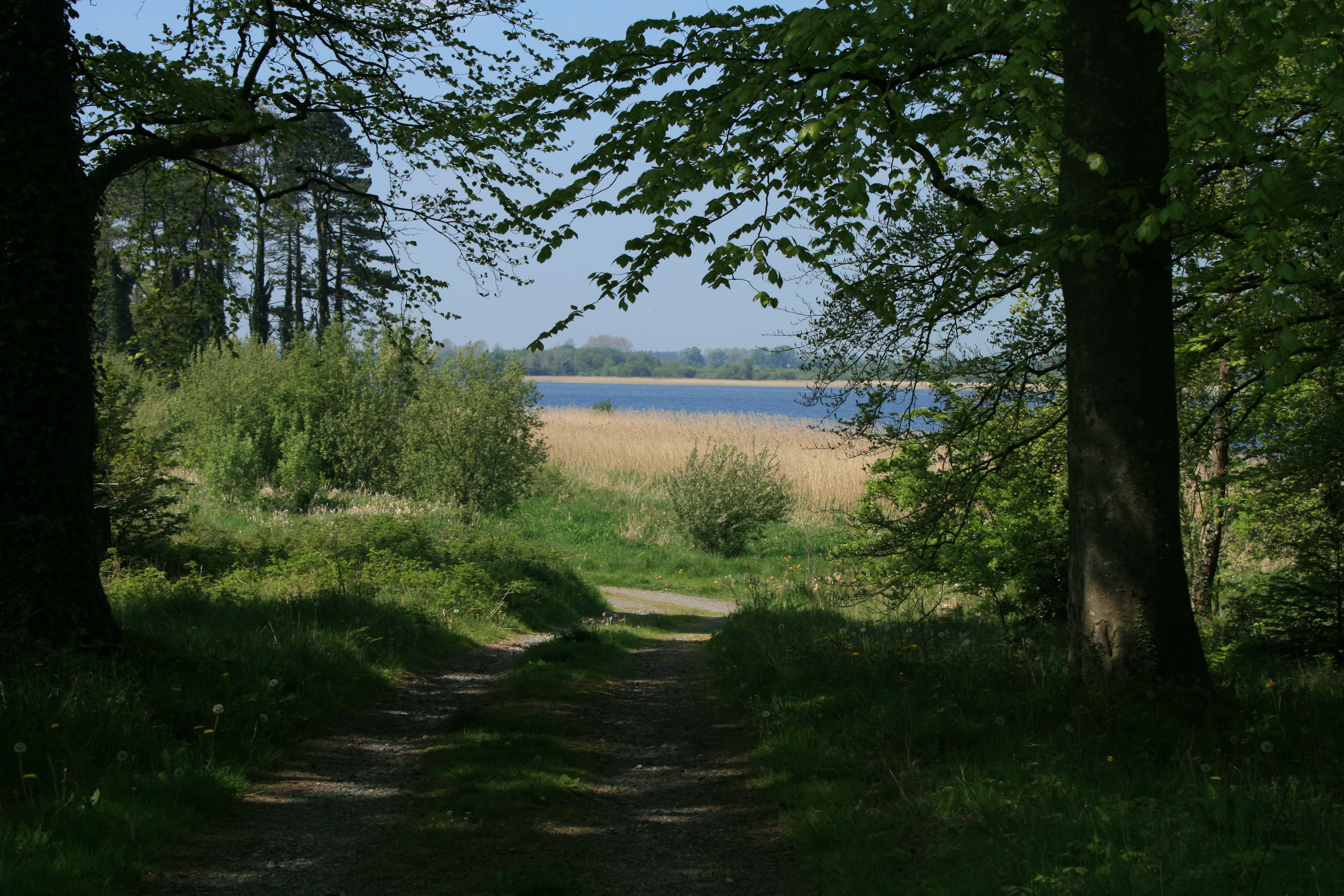
Northeastern shore

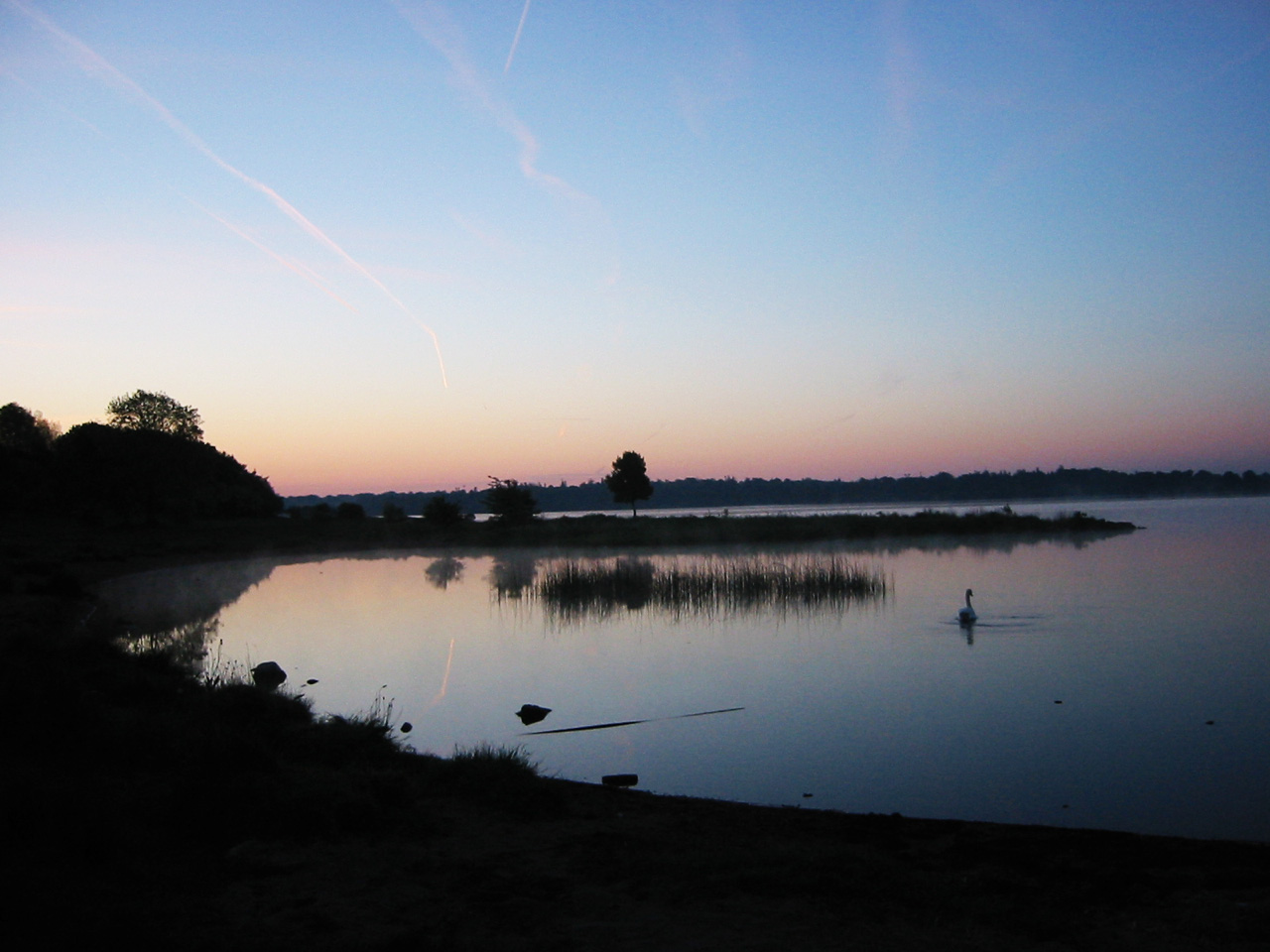
Early morning Summer sunrise

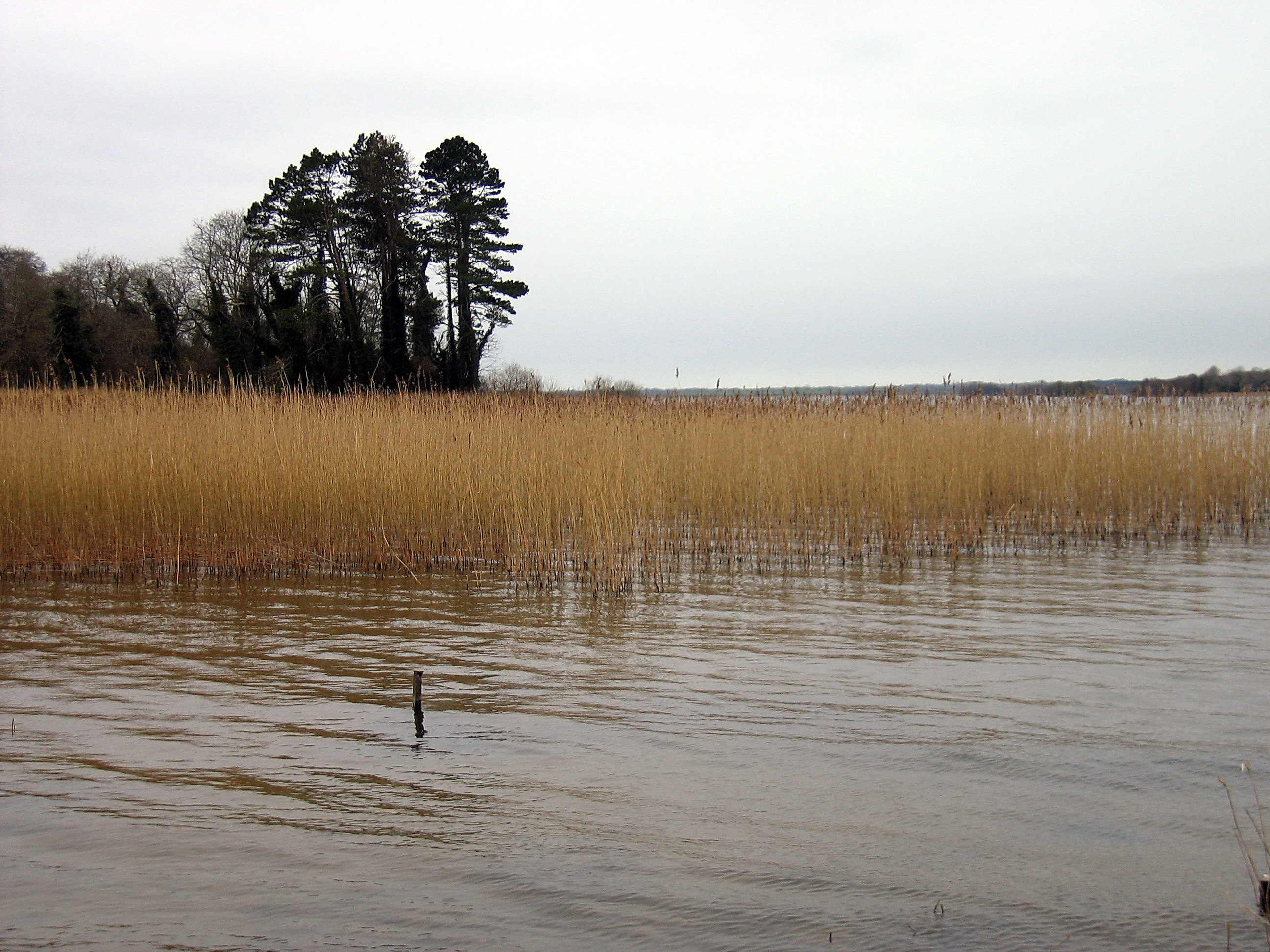
March 2007

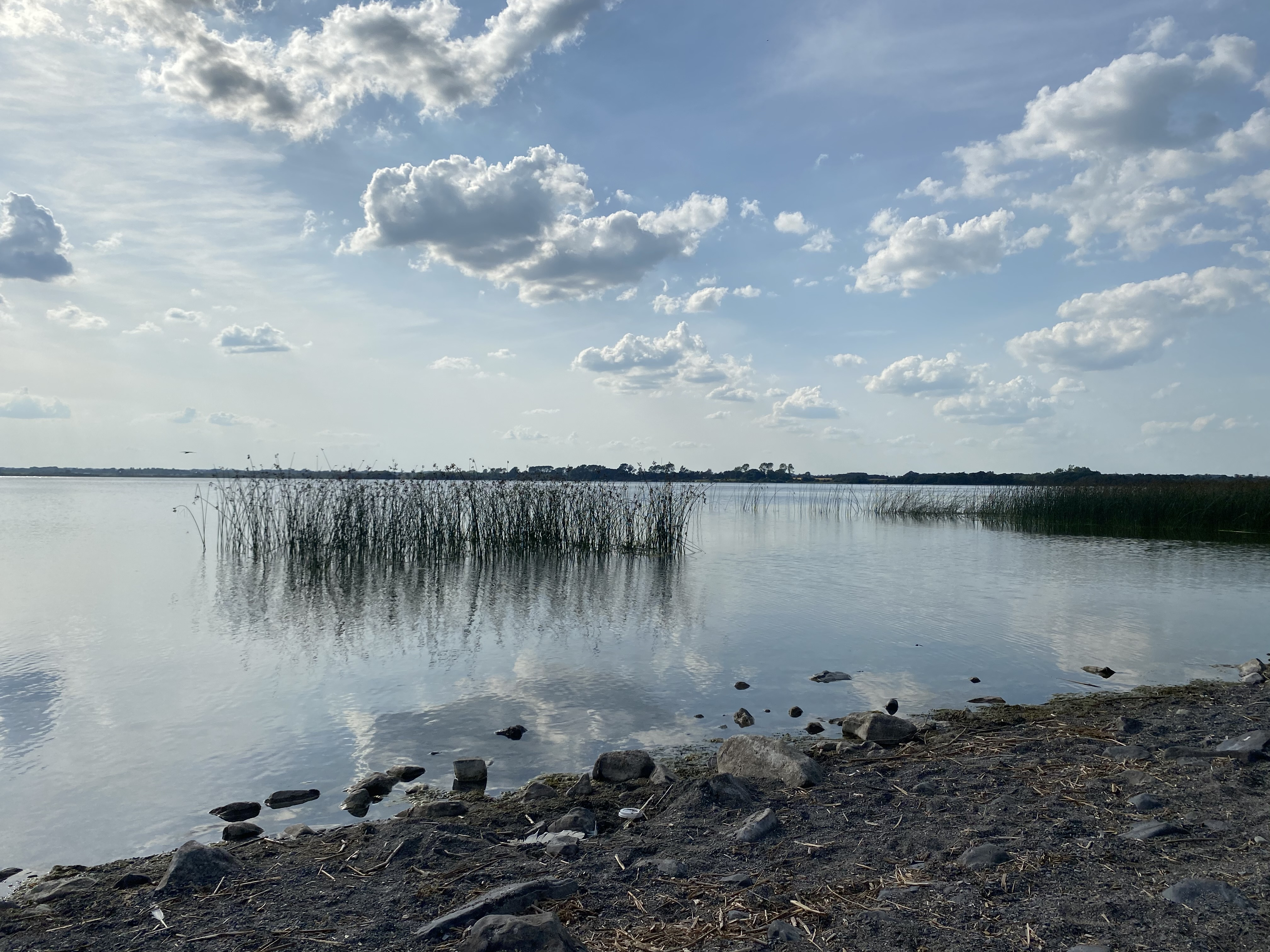
July 2021

== See also ==
- List of loughs in Ireland
