= Mullingar Town Park =

Park in Mullingar, Ireland

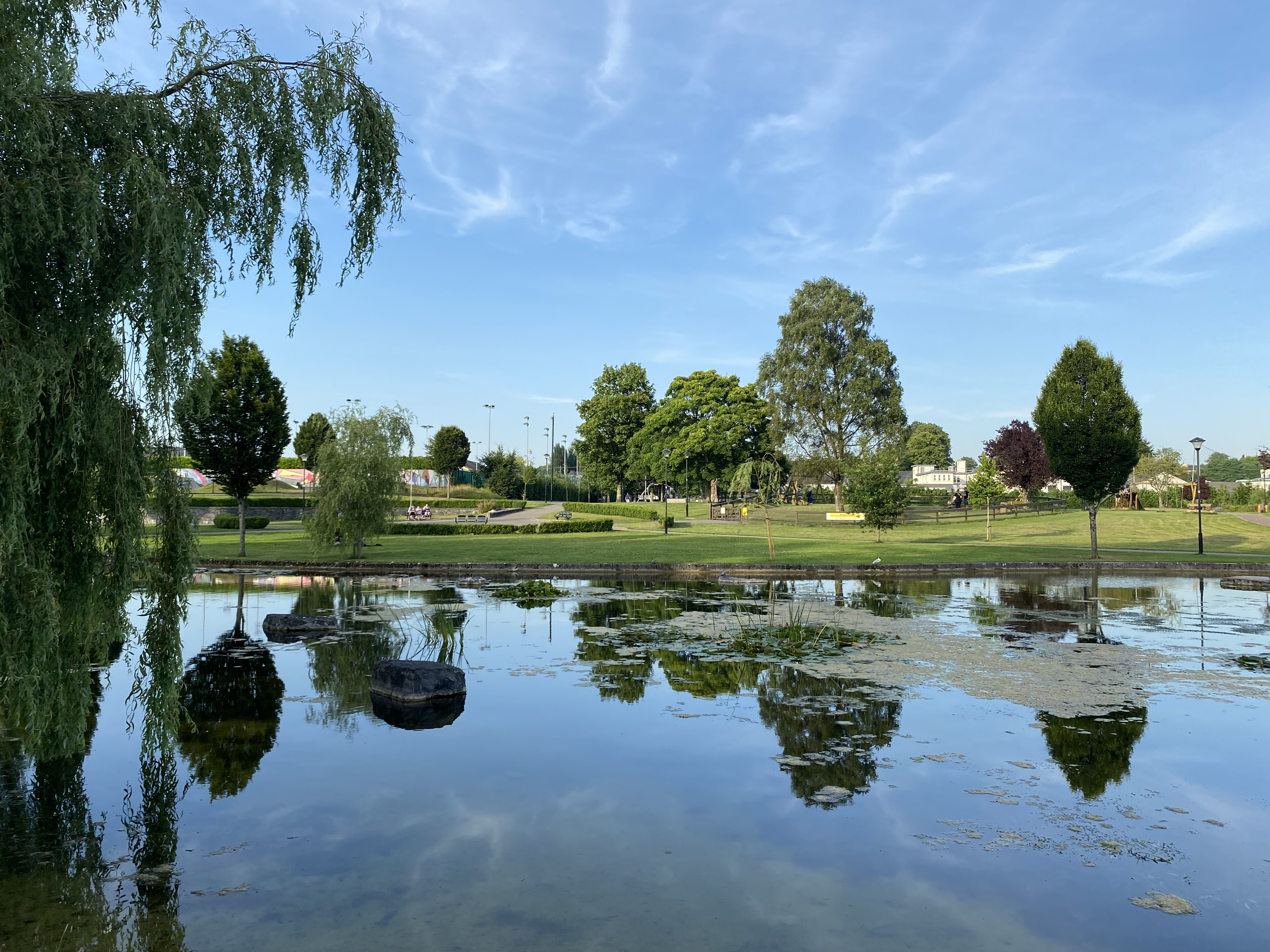
- View of the town park featuring the pond
- Interactive map of Mullingar Town Park
- Type: Public park
- Location: Mullingar, County Westmeath, Ireland
- Coordinates: 53°31′28″N 7°20′13″W
- Public transit: Bus Éireann

Mullingar Town Park is a public park situated in the centre of Mullingar, a town in County Westmeath, Ireland. Originally opened in the 1960s, the park includes several playgrounds, a swimming pool and a large pond near the centre. Annebrook House Hotel is located within the park.

In July 2016, the park became one of 22 public spaces in Ireland to be awarded a Green Flag. Also in 2016, it was announced that there would be high-speed WiFi available throughout the park.
