= Annebrook House Hotel =

- Interactive map of the Annebrook House Hotel area

General information
- Type: Hotel
- Classification: 4 stars
- Location: Austin Friars Street, Mullingar, County Westmeath, Ireland
- Coordinates: 53°31′30.1″N 7°20′18.9″W
- Year built: c. 1810
- Opened: 9 February 2007; 19 years ago
- Cost: €20 million
- Owner: Berty Dunne

Other information
- Number of rooms: 93

Website
- annebrook.ie

Annebrook House Hotel is a hotel in Mullingar, County Westmeath, Ireland. Opened in 2007, it incorporates the Annebrook House which dates from the early 1800s.

Westmeath GAA use the hotel for games, including for the winning 2026 Leinster Senior Football Championship team.

== History ==
=== Origins ===
The original Annebrook House is a Georgian house built in c. 1810 by the Westmeath Board of Guardians as a hostel for visiting clergy. It was later the residence for the county surgeon John O'Connell and then the home of Medical Officer of Health (MOH) Dr Hugh O'Neill and his family. It one of the oldest buildings still standing in Mullingar.

The property was auctioned in early April 2001 with Berty Dunne, a hotelier from County Kildare, making the winning bid. In October 2002, it was announced that a planning permission application was sent to Westmeath County Council to construct a 49-bedroom hotel with a restaurant and a further 44 aparthotel units alongside renovating the original house on the 1.9 acres (0.77 ha) site. By July 2004, the house was being extensively renovated. The hotel is located within Mullingar Town Park.

=== Opening ===
Berty Dunne was originally aiming for the hotel to open by Christmas 2006 but the opening was delayed until February 2007 at a total cost of almost €20 million. The hotel company was registered on 9 February 2007 as "Annebrook House Hotel Limited". In 2019, the hotel won the Hotel of the Year Irish Hospitality Award.

=== Extension ===
In 2022, the owners of Annebrook House Hotel announced that they had purchased the old Dunnes Stores premises on nearby Pearse Street a number of years prior and planned to expand there and build 60 additional bedrooms and a leisure centre on the ground floor. The extension project was given the go-ahead from Westmeath County Council in January 2025. In late July, Dunne stated that the project is expected to take 18 months with the foundations having been laid earlier in the month.
