= Mullingar Golf Club =

Golf club in County Westmeath, Ireland

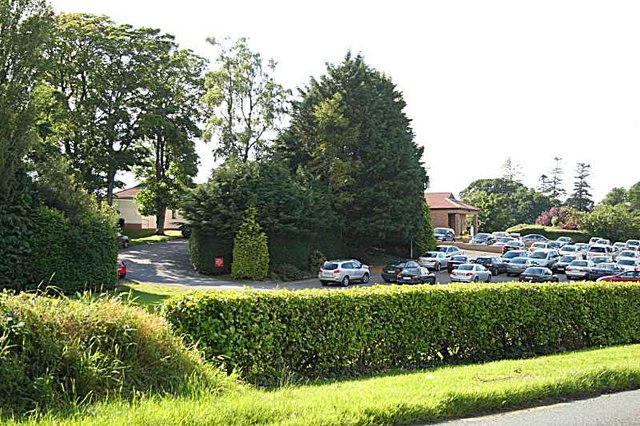
- A view of the golf club and car park

- The location of the golf club in Westmeath
- 53.4816°N 7.35747°W

Club information
- Location: Mullingar, County Westmeath, Ireland
- Established: 1894 (Westmeath Golf Club); 1937 (Mullingar Golf Club)
- Type: Private
- Total holes: 18
- Designed by: James Braid
- Par: 72
- Length: 6,685 yards (3.798 mi)

Mullingar Golf Club is a private golf club located in County Westmeath, Ireland. Originally founded in 1894, the golf club is situated on the Belvedere estate, located 5 kilometres (3.1 mi) from Mullingar town.

== History ==
The club was originally called the Westmeath Golf Club when it was founded in 1894, and the first members played on what is described as "a small course" on the site of Mullingar Race Course. In 1903, the club moved to a nine-hole layout just north of Mullingar town and golf was only permitted in the winter months as the farmer who owned the land needed the use of it in the summer.

Land became available to the golf club at the Belvedere House Estate in 1934. The golf course architect, James Braid, was hired to design and oversee the construction of the course at Belvedere, which was opened for play in 1937.

In 1963, Mullingar Golf Club members organised a Scratch Cup competition. This competition is now accredited with the Bridgestone Points System, which has elevated its status as an Irish championship competition. Past winners include Joe Carr, the inaugural winner, Darren Clarke, Paul McGinley, Pádraig Harrington, Shane Lowry and Rory McIlroy.

Mullingar Golf Club is a private members club, with members volunteering to help manage the affairs of the club. The club also employs full-time staff to manage the business and maintain the facilities.
