= Dublin 15 =

Postal district of Dublin, Ireland

Dublin 15 (D15) Baile Átha Cliath 15
- Postal district
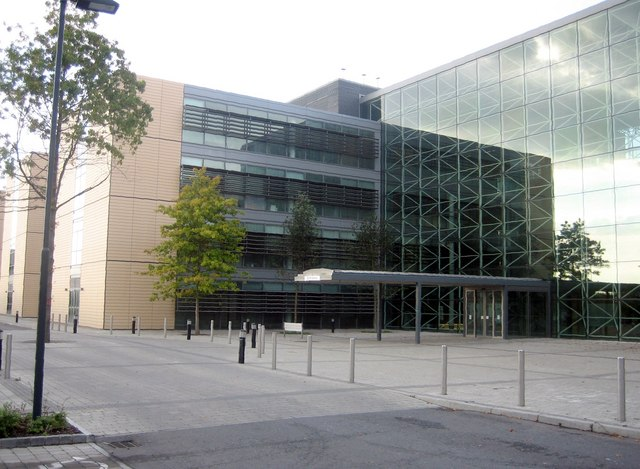
- County Council Offices, Blanchardstown

- Location in Ireland
- Coordinates: 53.390803°N 6.392810°W
- Country: Ireland
- Province: Leinster
- Local authority: Fingal County Council (small part in Dublin City Council)
- Dáil constituency: Dublin West
- EP constituency: Dublin
- Postal district(s): D15
- Dialing code: 01, +353 1

Dublin 15, also rendered as D15, is a postal district in the suburbs of Dublin, Ireland. It is 11 km (6.8 mi) west of the General Post Office in Dublin city.

== Geography and political subdivisions ==
Dublin 15 covers a large area, rising from the River Liffey to 93 metres (305 ft) at the townland of Cloghran near the Rosemount Business Park. The district is bordered by County Meath to the west and the northwest and by the Ratoath Road to the northeast. The land between the Ratoath Road / Cappagh Road and the M2 / N2 road lies in the Dublin 11 postal district. The townland of Ashtown and the boundary walls of the Phoenix Park is the district's eastern boundary. The Liffey forms the southern limit with the anomalous exception of that part of Dublin 20 that contains the village of Chapelizod.

Dublin 15 lies primarily within the county of Fingal. Administrative offices of Fingal County Council are located in the grounds of the Blanchardstown Shopping Centre.

For elections to Dáil Éireann, the district is entirely contained within the Dáil constituency of Dublin West. Only three electoral divisions of the constituency lie outside Dublin 15: Kilsallaghan, Lucan North, and Swords-Forrest.

Dublin 15 borders four other postal districts; Dublin 11 and Dublin 7 to the east; Dublin 20 and Dublin 8 to the south.

The district overlaps at many points with the historic barony of Castleknock. Three civil parishes of the barony are not in Dublin 15; Ward, Chapelizod and St James'; the five remaining parishes are contained in the district.

=== Civil parishes ===
The following civil parishes (as opposed to ecclesiastical parishes) lie in Dublin 15 (along with notable townlands, indented).

- Castleknock (part of)
  - Blanchardstown, Castleknock, Cabra, Corduff, Dunsink
- Clonsilla
  - Clonsilla, Coolmine,
- Cloghran
- Mulhuddart

- Huntstown, Hartstown, Littlepace, Tyrrelstown

- Finglas (part of)

== Transport ==
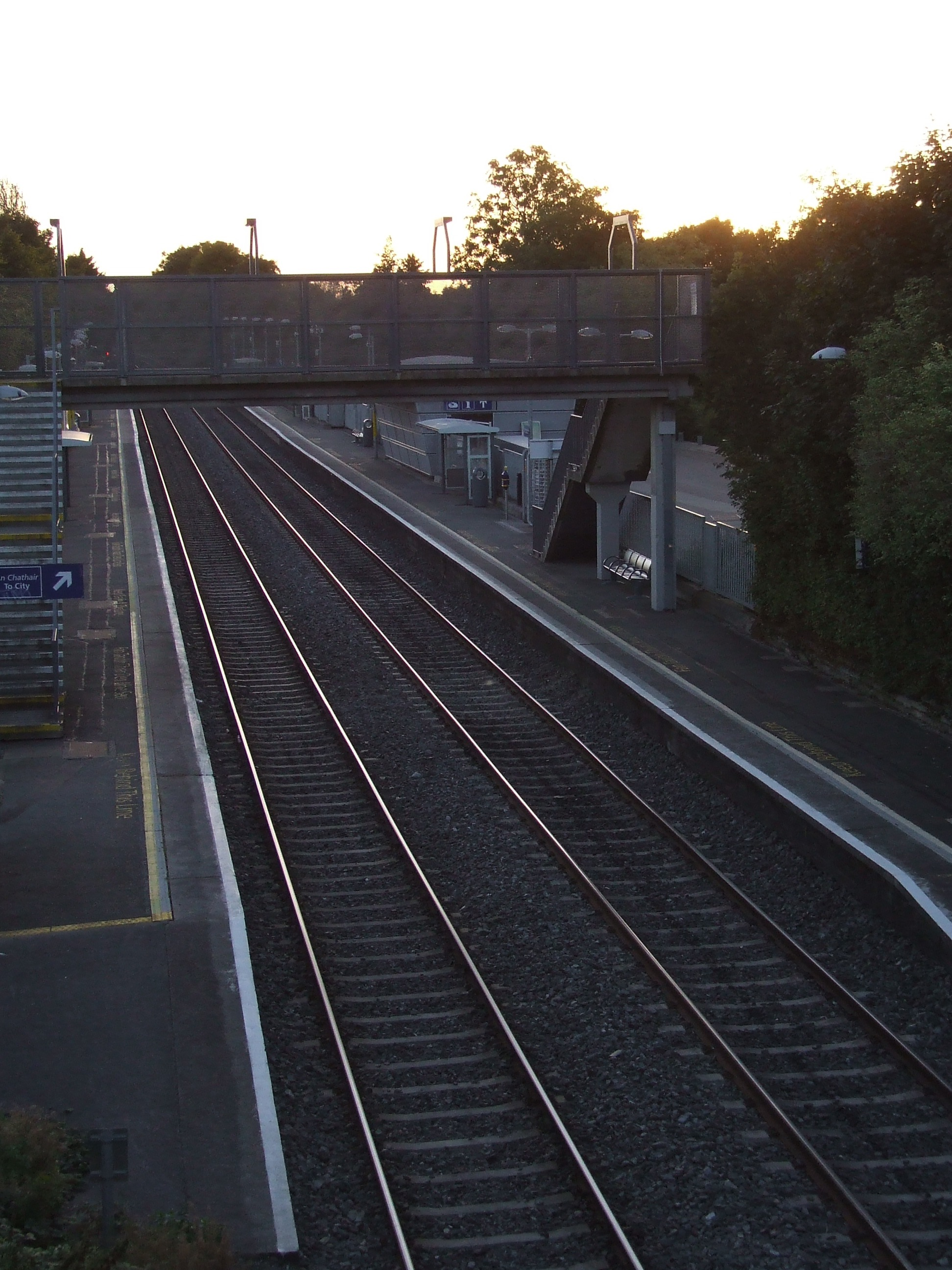
Castleknock Railway Station, September 2012

The Dublin Suburban Rail western or Maynooth Line runs from Dublin Connolly to Maynooth. The five stops in the district, from east to west, are Ashtown railway station, Navan Road Parkway, Castleknock, Coolmine and Clonsilla. The Dublin Docklands to M3 Parkway line branches at Clonsilla to Hansfield serving the community of Casteheany and Ongar.
