= Castleknock (civil parish) =

Parish in County Dublin, Ireland

Coordinates: 53.368010°N 6.369802°W

Castleknock (Irish: Caisleán Cnucha) is a civil parish and a townland located in the south-western corner of the modern county of Fingal, Ireland. The civil parish is part of the ancient barony of Castleknock. It is centred on the suburban village of Castleknock. The townland of Castleknock itself is the location of the eponymous "Cnucha's Castle" – Castleknock Castle. The town with the biggest population in the parish is Blanchardstown. In geology, the parish rests on a substratum of limestone and comprises 2943 statute acres, the whole of which is arable land.

== History ==
In 1831, there were 4251 inhabitants in the parish of whom 3409 were Catholics. Lewis' Topography of Ireland of 1837 reported the same number of inhabitants. Lewis recorded that Abbotstown demesne was the most notable seat in the parish. It was the residence of the Falkiner baronets who later married into the neighbouring Hamilton family. In 1897, Ion Trant Hamilton was ennobled as Baron HolmPatrick

=== Ecclesiastical parishes ===
Like all civil parishes, this civil parish is derived from, and co-extensive with a pre-existing ecclesiastical parish of the same name, as used in the Church of Ireland. Along with other civil parishes in Ireland, its use as a unit of the local administrative unit was gradually replaced by the creation of Electoral Divisions in the Local Government (Ireland) Act 1898. The parish formerly belonged to the priory of Malvern, in Worcestershire. In 1773, an act of the Privy Council united the parish with the curacies of Clonsilla and Mulhuddart. The living (of the ecclesiastical parish) was a vicarage in the Diocese of Dublin which was: "... endowed with a portion of the great tithes, and united to the prebend of Castleknock and the rectory of Clonsillagh and curacy of Mullahidart, with cure of souls: it is in the patronage of the Bishop." In 1837, the tithes amounted to £560.

In the Church of Ireland, the Archdiocese of Dublin unites Castleknock and Mulhuddart in the "Grouped Parishes of Castleknock and Mulhuddart with Clonsilla". (Note: Church of Ireland - Grouped Parishes of Castleknock and Mulhuddart with Clonsilla) There are three extant church buildings that are still in use by the grouped parish:

- St. Brigid's, Castleknock, situated in the centre of Castleknock. The building – a listed national monument – was completed in 1870. (Note: Saint Brigid's Church of Ireland Church, Castleknock Road, CASTLEKNOCK (WITHOUT PHOENIX PARK), Castleknock, Fingal - Register number 11362003) It was rebuilt by a loan of £1000 from the Board of First Fruits and large subscriptions, in 1810. It features a three-stage tower to the west gable with a Gothic tympanum at the entrance and a stained glass window by Harry Clarke that is dedicated to Saint Hubert.
- St. Thomas', Mulhuddart, situated on the Kilbride Road near Hollystown Golf Club. The building – a listed national monument – was constructed in 1870. (Note: Saint Thomas's Church of Ireland Church, Ratoath Road, HOLLYSTOWN, Fingal - Register number 11346001) It features a polygonal bell tower in the south corner.
- St. Mary's, Clonsilla, situated at the western end of the Clonsilla Road near Clonsilla railway station. The building – a listed national monument – was constructed in 1846. (Note: Saint Mary's Church of Ireland Church, CLONSILLA, Clonsilla, Fingal - Register number 11353005) It features stained glass windows by Evie Hone.

In the Catholic Church, the Archdiocese of Dublin divides the civil parish between the following ecclesiastical parishes:

- "Our Lady, Mother of the Church", Castleknock. (Note: Parish of Our Lady, Mother of the Church, Castleknock) (Note: Catholic Church - Our Lady, Mother of the Church parish)
- "St. Brigid's", Blanchardstown. (Note: Parish of St. Brigid, Blanchardstown) (Note: Catholic Church - St. Brigid's parish)
- "St. Thomas, the Apostle", Laurel Lodge / Carpenterstown. (Note: Parish of St. Thomas the Apostle, Laurel Lodge / Carpenterstown) (Note: Catholic Church - St. Thomas the Apostle parish)

=== Gallery of church buildings ===
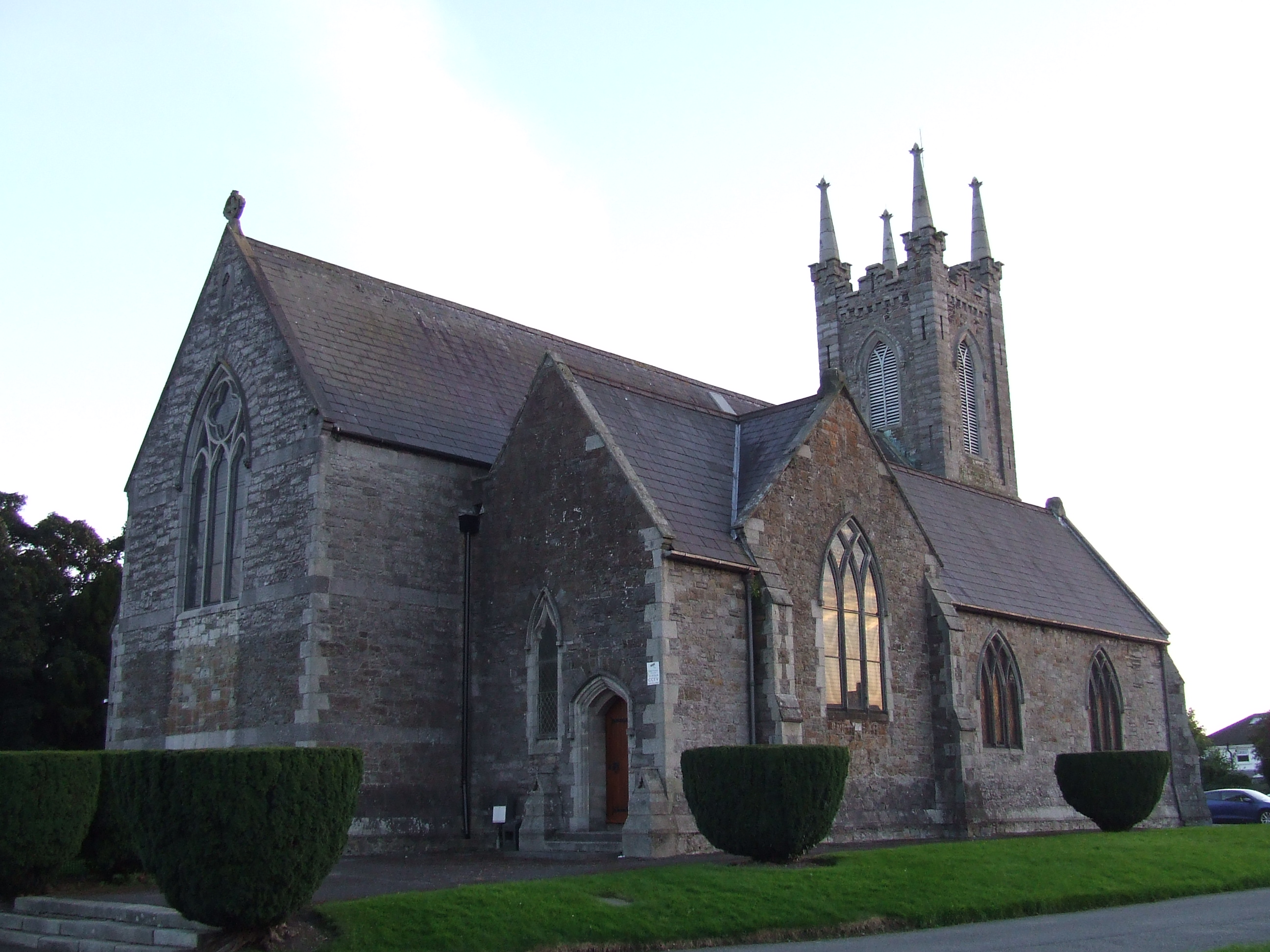
Church of St. Bridget
in the Church of Ireland, Castleknock

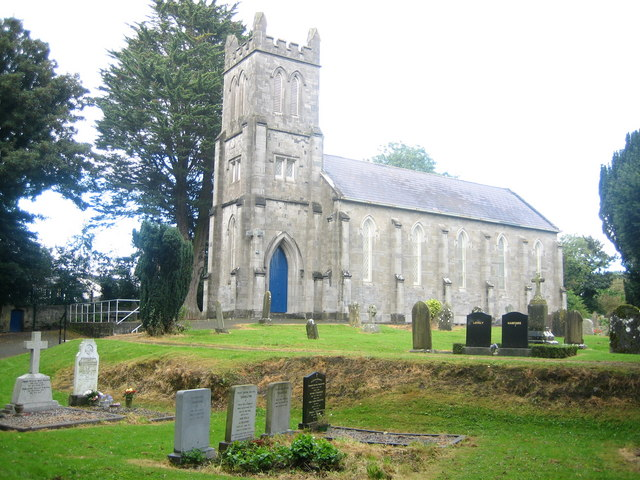
Church of St. Mary
in the Church of Ireland, Clonsilla

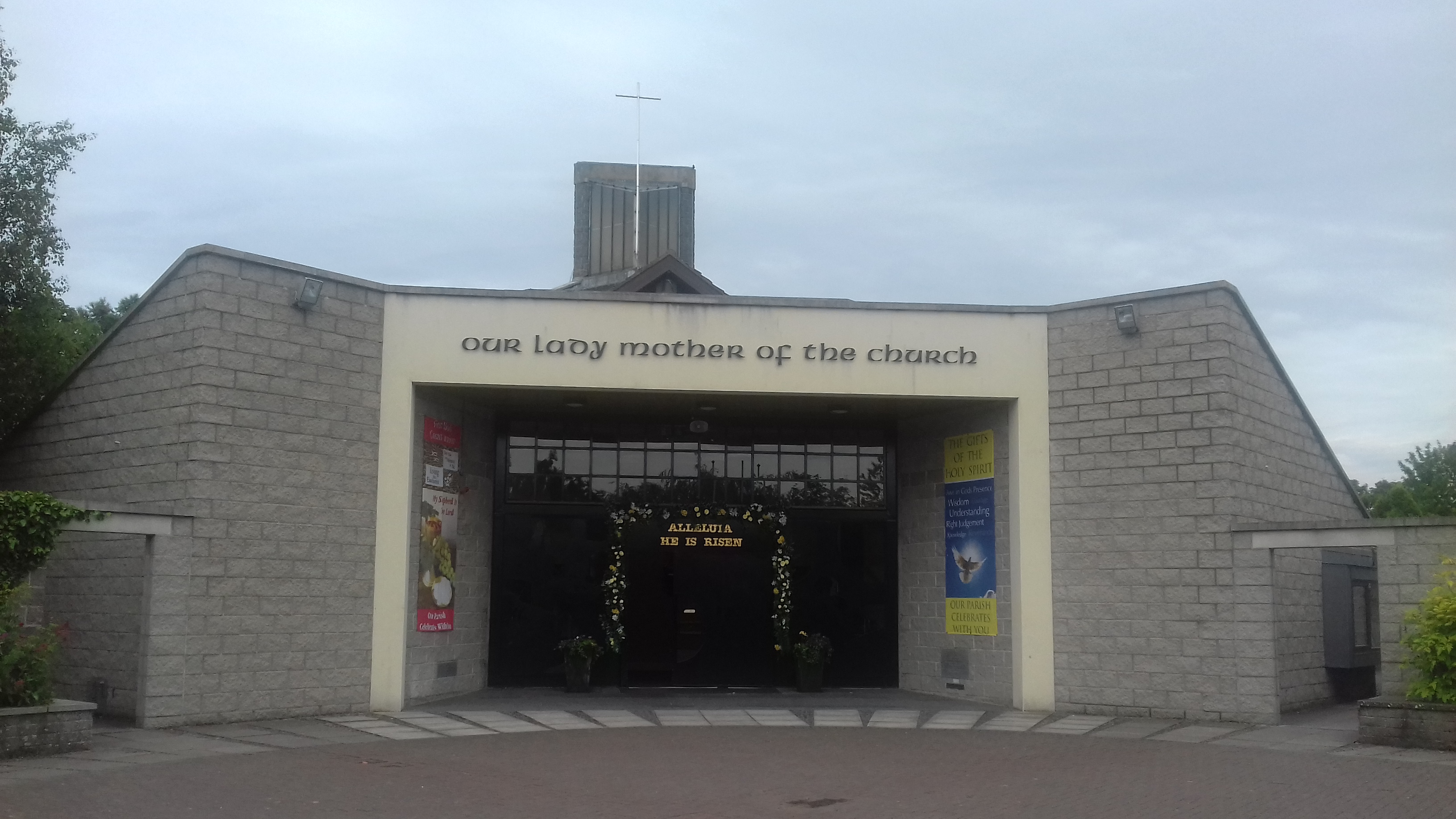
Our Lady Mother of the Church
in the Catholic Church, Castleknock

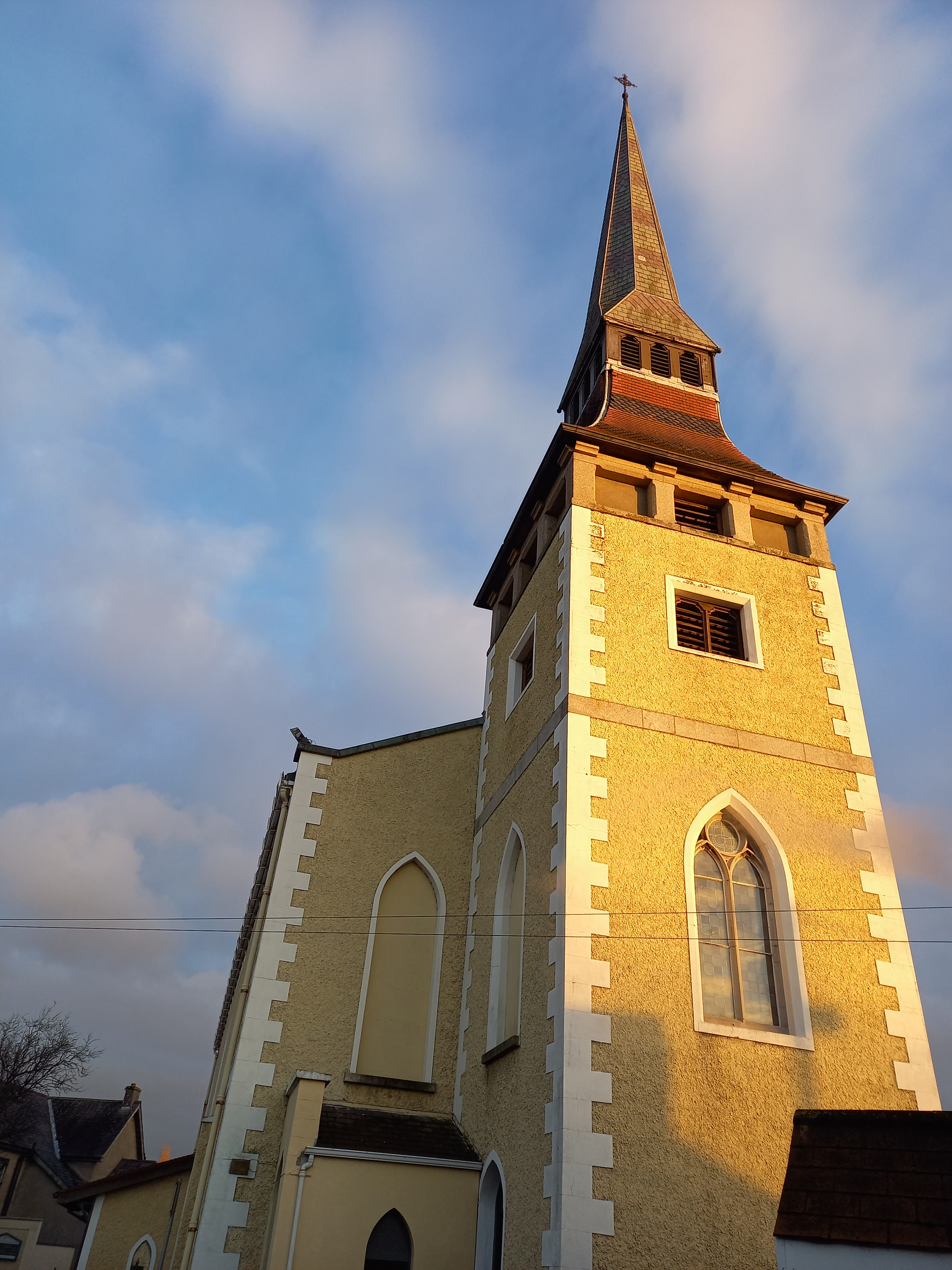
Church of St. Brigit
in the Catholic Church, Blanchardstown

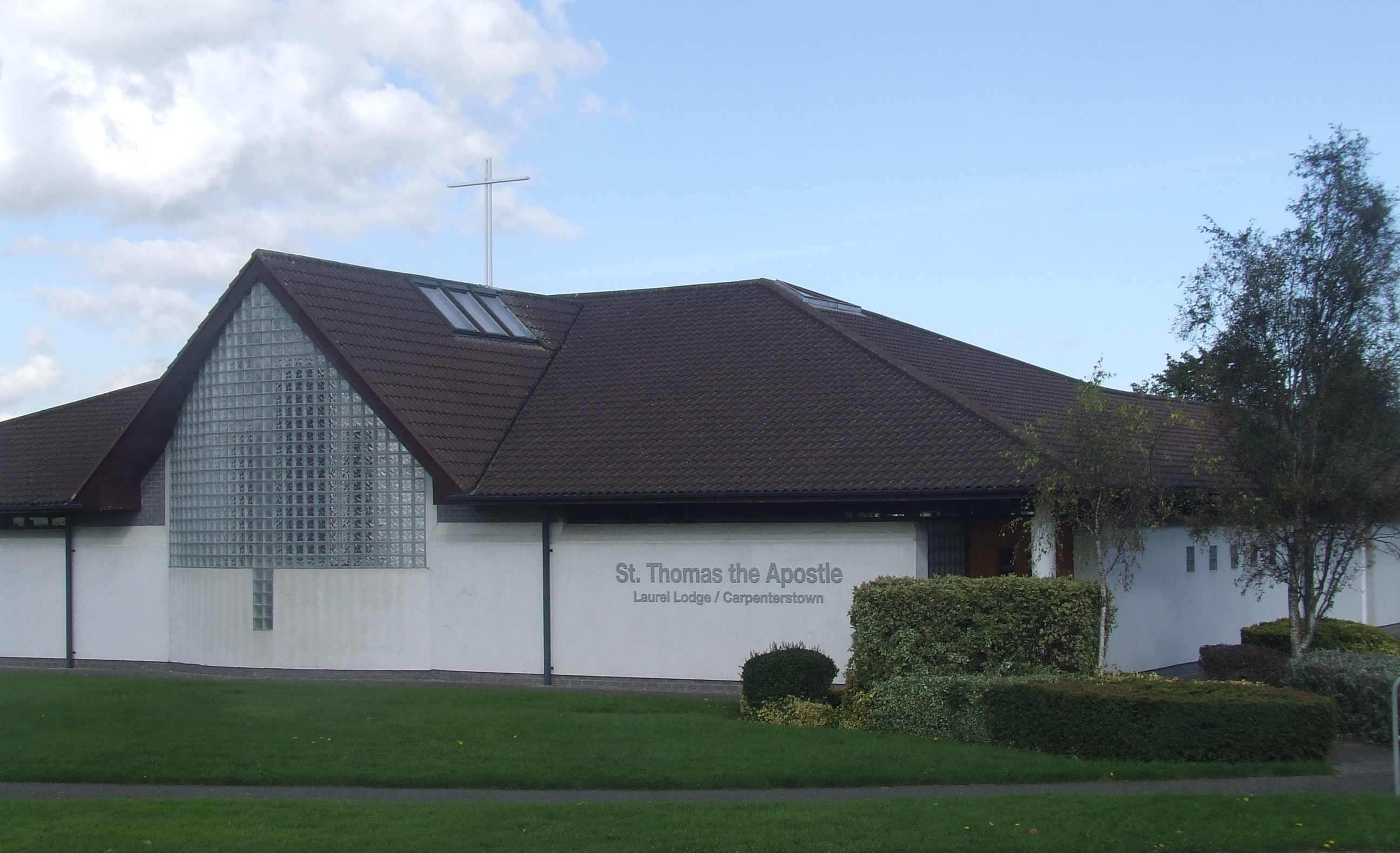
Church of St. Thomas, the Apostle
in the Catholic Church, Laurel Lodge

== Location and composition ==
The whole parish is within the Dublin 15 postal district. Most of the territory of the parish is within the county of Fingal and administered by Fingal County Council with the exception of three townlands that are in the city proper and administered by Dublin City Council. The core of the parish is centred on the townland and village of the same name. To the north of the parish, the Huntstown Power Station and Corduff sub-supply station are located. The townland at this northern extremity of the parish is Huntstown, not to be confused with Huntstown and Littlepace in the neighbouring parish of Clonsilla. To the south, it is bounded by the River Liffey and Chapelizod. To the west, it is bounded by the civil parish of Clonsilla which is the location of Blanchardstown Shopping Centre. To the east lies the 8th lock of the Royal Canal in the townland of Pelletstown and the Cabra Gate of the Phoenix Park.

=== Populated places ===
Populated places in the civil parish include: Blanchardstown, Castleknock, Ashtown, Cabra, Corduff, Laurel Lodge.

=== Townlands ===
Within the civil parish of Castleknock, there are 22 townlands per the table below. For convenience, the table groups the townlands by their location in one of the modern local authority areas.

Modern Local Authority Area	Name in Irish & Name in English	Acres	Image	Commons Category
Dublin City	Baile Pheiléid; Pelletstown	259	Moorings on the Royal Canal	
Dublin City	An Chabrach; Cabra	457	Primary Care Centre, Navan Road	
Dublin City	Caisleán Cnucha (cuid de Pháirc an Fhionnuisce); Castleknock (part of Phoenix Park)	787	Deer by papal cross	
Fingal	Baile an Aba; Abbotstown	101	Abbotstown cemetery	
Fingal	Baile an Ásaigh; Ashtown	278	Martin Savage memorial	
Fingal	Baile an Chairpintéaraigh; Carpenterstown	166	Stone placename	
Fingal	Baile an Déanaigh; Deanestown	173	Waterville Park	
Fingal	Baile an Diosualaigh; Diswellstown	418	Diswellstown stream	
Fingal	Baile an Huntaigh; Huntstown	299		
Fingal	Baile an Phóirtéaraigh; Porterstown	219	Scoil Choilm	
Fingal	Baile Bhlainséir; Blanchardstown	454	Spire of St. Brigit's church	
Fingal	Baile Mhistéil; Mitchelstown	154	Car dealership	
Fingal	Baile Scriobail; Scribblestown	272	Former Rathborne's Candles factory	
Fingal	Baile Sheáin; Johnstown	67		
Fingal	Caisleán Cnucha; Castleknock	1020	St Bridget's well. Former bank.	
Fingal	Ceapach; Cappoge or Cappagh	698	Halting site on Cappagh Road	
Fingal	Cnoc na gCaorach; Sheephill	349	F.A.I. headquarters	
Fingal	An Chorr Dhubh; Corduff	353	St Patrick's church	
Fingal	Dún Sinche; Dunsink	423	Dunsink observatory	
Fingal	Páirc Anna; Annfield	19	Apartment buildings	
Fingal	Snugborough; Snugborough	53		
Fingal	Steach Gob; Astagob	93	Weir by the Wren's Nest	

== Gallery ==
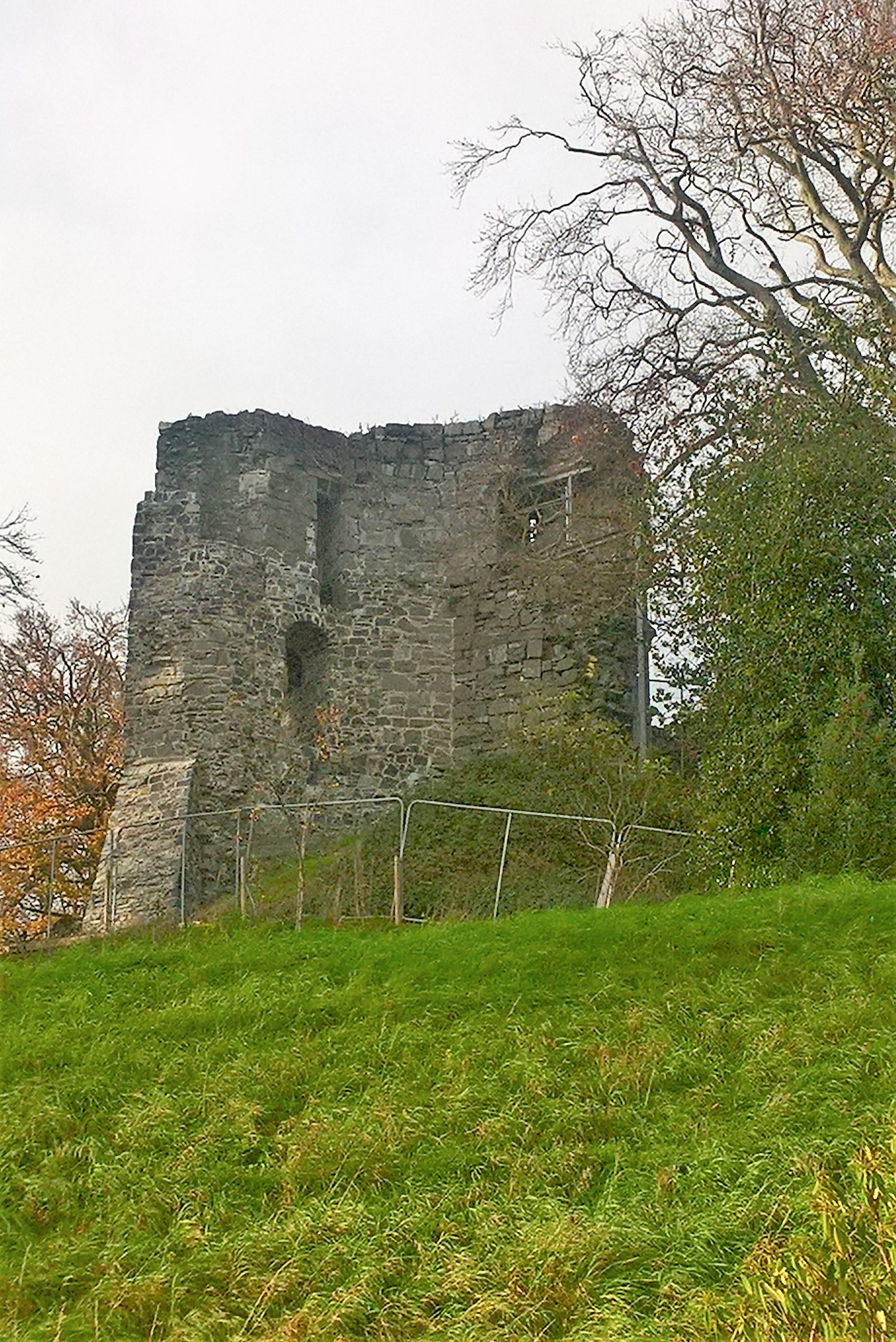
Castleknock Castle

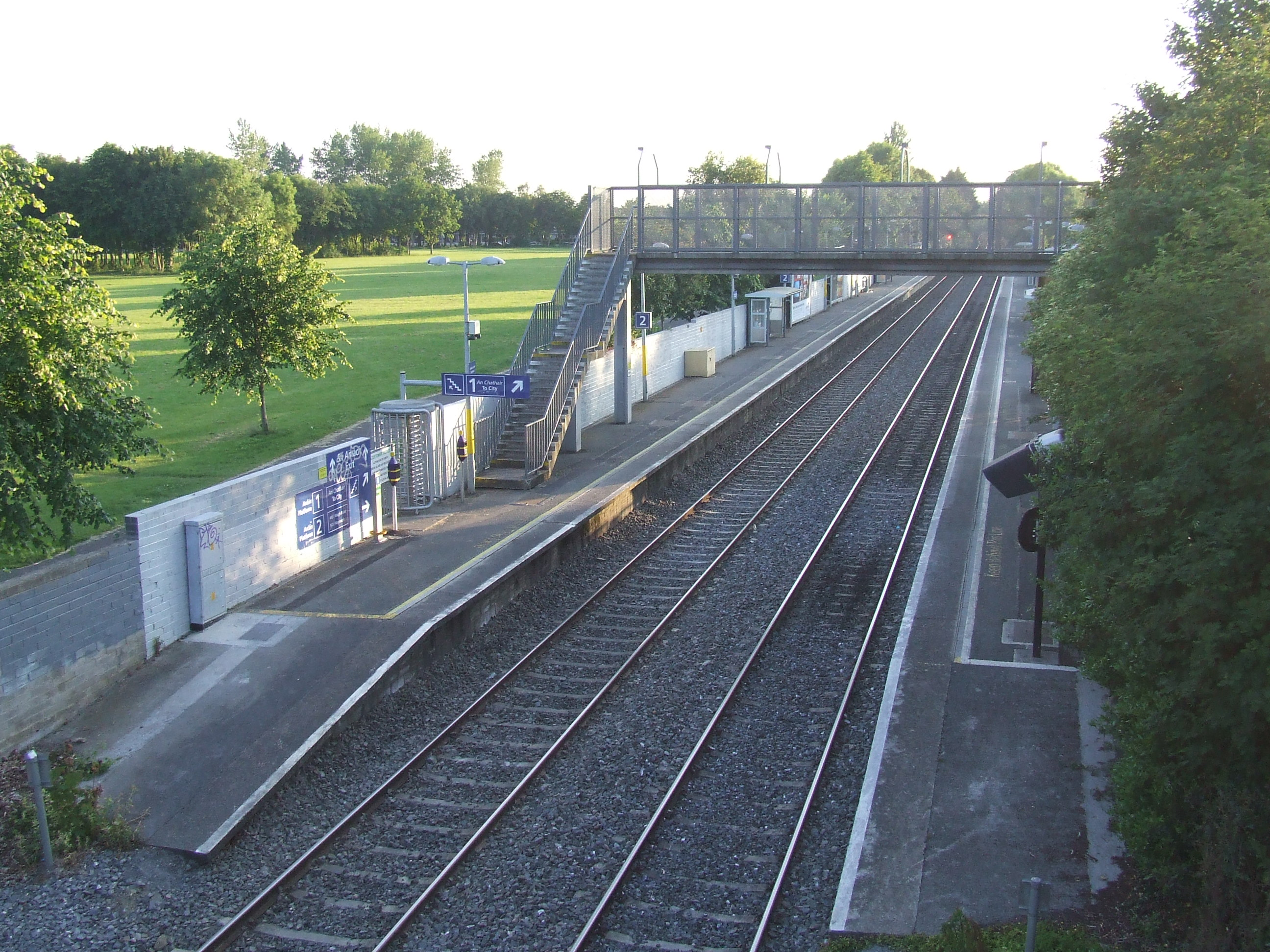
Castleknock Railway Station

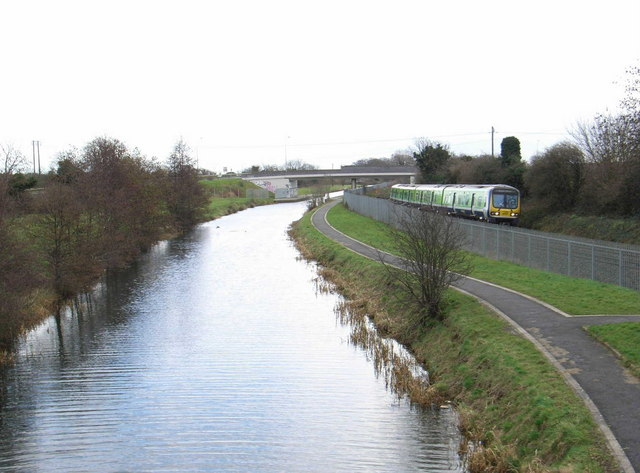
Royal Canal at Castleknock

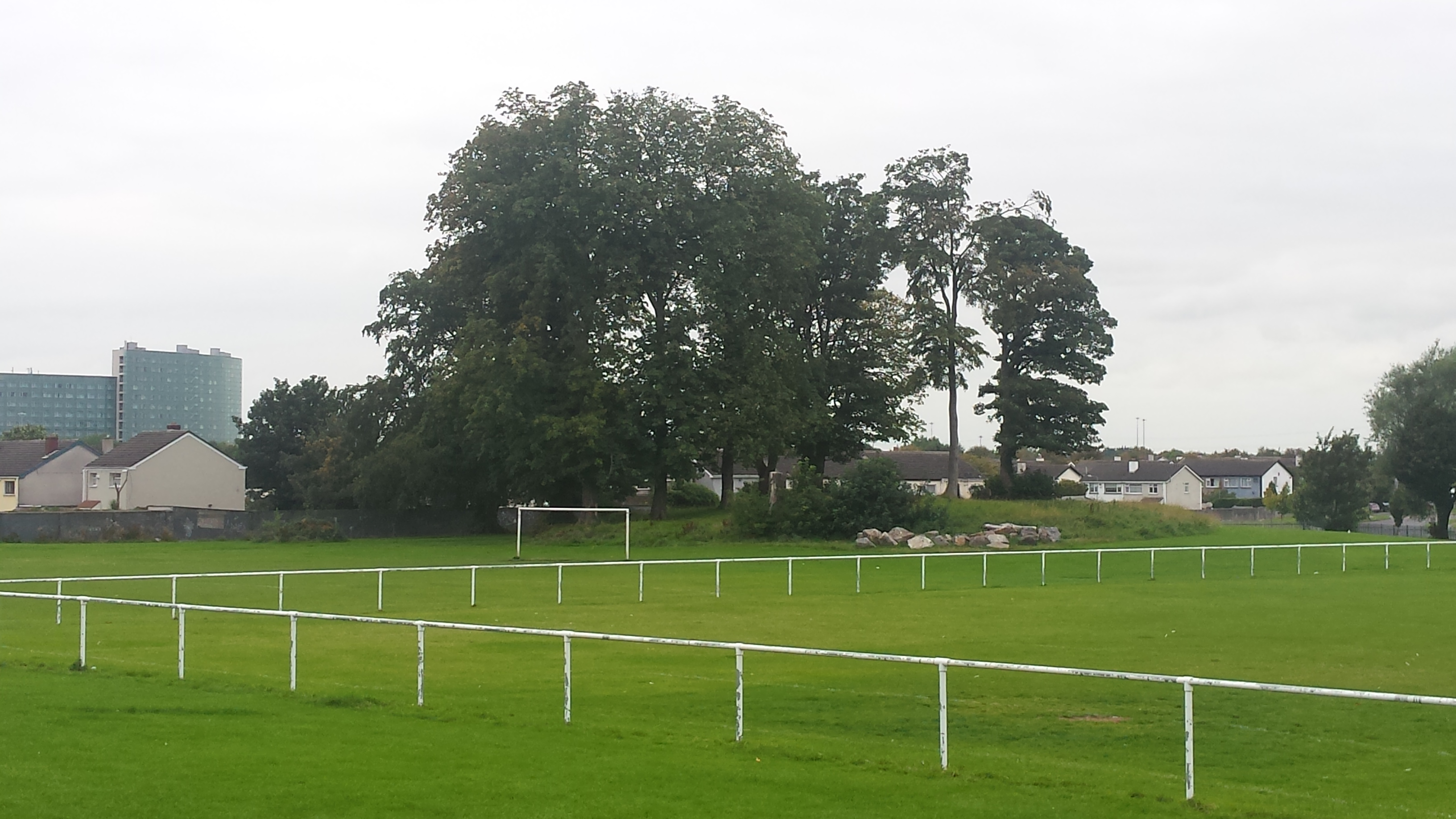
Ringfort or mound at Corduff

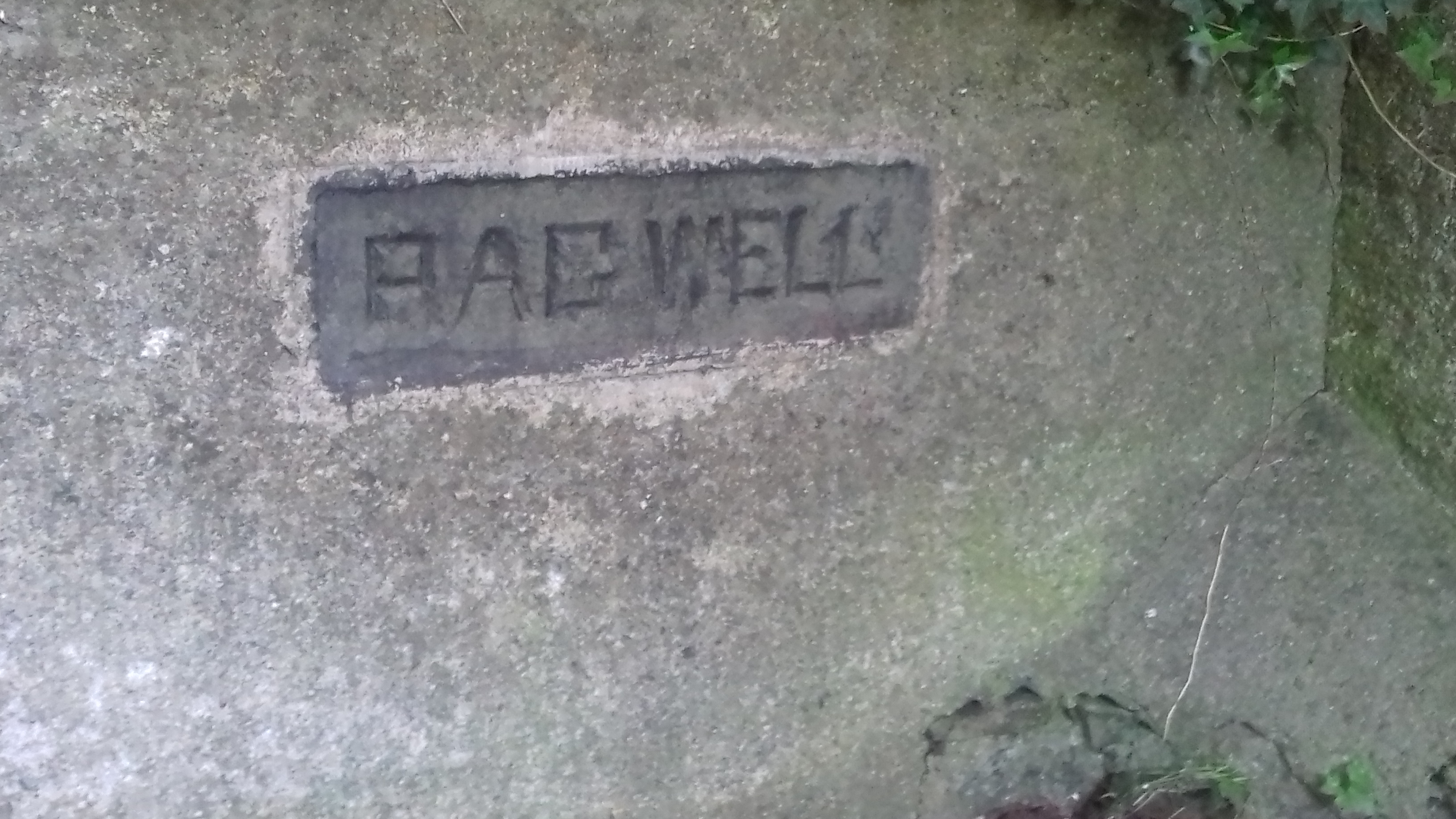
Ragwell at Diswellstown
