= Ashtown, Dublin =

Suburb of Dublin, Ireland

Ashtown Baile an Ásaigh (Irish)
- Suburb
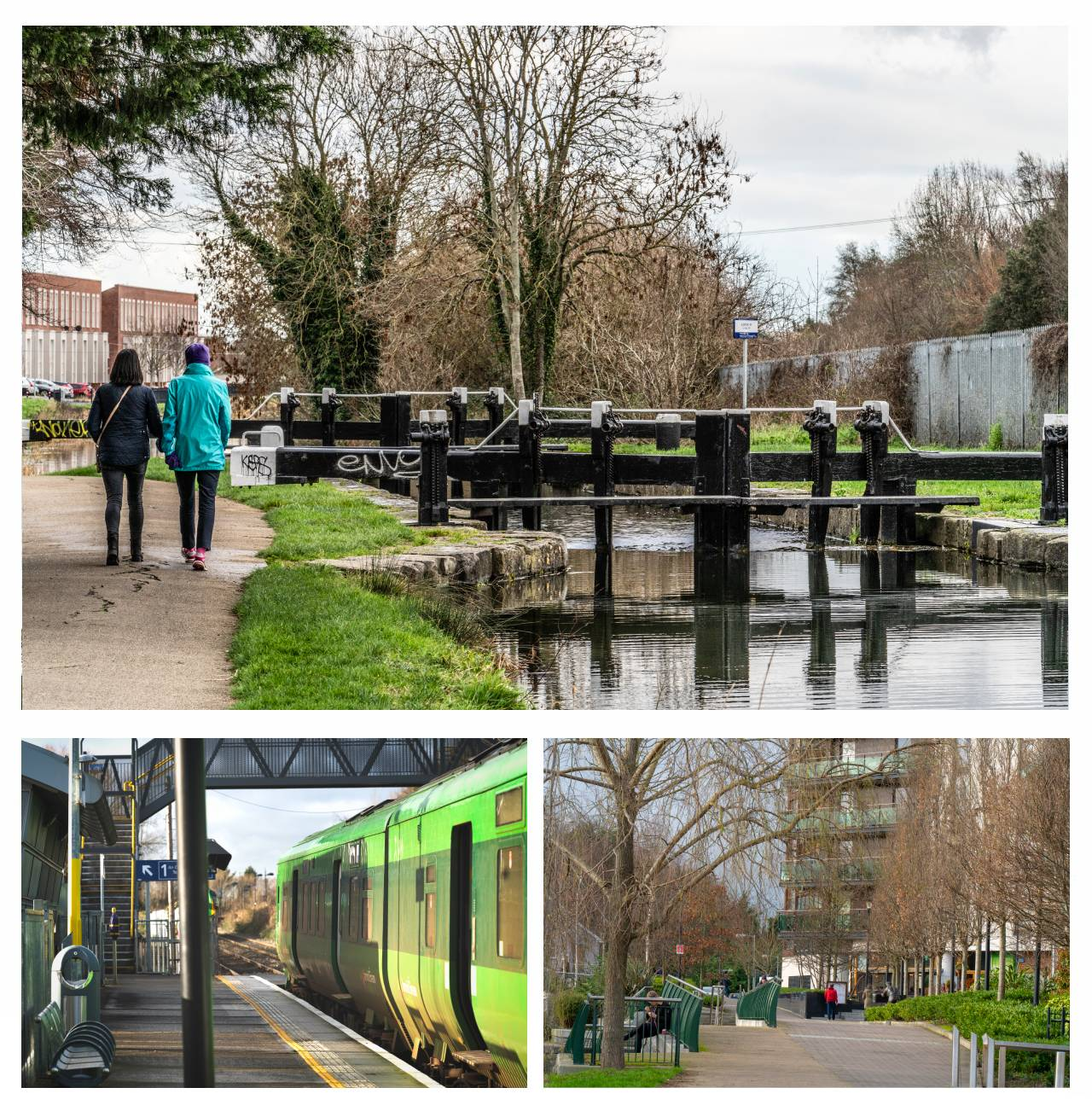
- Ashtown, Dublin

- Location in Dublin
- Coordinates: 53°22′31″N 6°19′58″W
- Country: Ireland
- Province: Leinster
- County: County Dublin
- Local authority: Dublin City Council

Population (2002)
  - Urban: 22,740
- Time zone: UTC+0 (WET)
  - Summer (DST): UTC-1 (IST (WEST))
- Eircode routing key: D07, D15
- Irish Grid Reference: O133369

Ashtown (Irish: Baile an Ásaigh) is a suburb of Dublin, Ireland. It is also a townland in the civil parish of Castleknock and falls largely into the postal district of Dublin 15, with some addresses in the Dublin 7 postal district.

Ashtown is bounded roughly by the townlands of Castleknock to the west. Finglas to the North, Cabra to the East and the Phoenix Park to the South. It is situated by the Royal Canal, near the Navan Road, which some addresses being named off Navan Road. The Phoenix Park is also nearby, its Ashtown Gate entrance about 500 metres south of the railway station. The townland's 278 acres are within Dublin City whereas Castleknock is in Fingal. The suburb had a population of 13,209 inhabitants as reported in the 2016 census.

Teagasc has a food research centre at Ashtown.

== Transport ==
The Dublin–Sligo railway line passes through the area and it is served by Ashtown railway station, which opened on 1 August 1902. Stopping at Ashtown is the Western Commuter service, which runs frequently between Maynooth and Pearse Station in the city centre. The area is also served by the 120 Dublin Bus route, which terminates at the railway station, and by the 37, 38, 39 and 70 routes, which pass nearby on the Navan Road.

Broombridge railway station, on the Commuter route, has since December 2017 also acted as a terminus for the Green Line of the Luas. A new railway station, called Pelletstown, was opened in September 2021, between Broombridge and Ashtown stations.

== Sport ==
The grounds of St Oliver Plunketts/Eoghan Ruadh GAA are located in Martin Savage Park, which is just to the south of the railway line and runs along it. Phoenix FC, formerly known as Kinvara Ards, also use this park for their youth teams, but have used a football complex in Scribblestown for their senior team since their merger with Ashtown Villa in 2006.

== Education ==
National (primary) schools in the area include Pelletstown Educate Together National School, St. John Bosco Junior Boys' National School, St. John Bosco Senior Boys' National School and Mary Help of Christians Girl's National School.

== Electoral geography ==
Ashtown is in the Dáil constituency of Dublin West and the local electoral area of Cabra–Glasnevin for Dublin City Council.
