= Navan Road Parkway railway station =

Railway station in Dublin, Ireland

Navan Road Parkway Ollpháirc Bhóthar na hUaimhe

General information
- Other names: Phoenix Park
- Location: Navan Road; Dublin, D15 YX57; Ireland
- Coordinates: 53.3776°N 6.3454°W
- Owner: Iarnród Éireann
- Operator: Iarnród Éireann
- Platforms: 2
- Tracks: 2
- Bus operators: Bus Éireann; Dublin Bus
- Connections: 38; 38A; 38B; 38D; 39; 39A; 70; 70N; 105; 109; 109B; 109X; 111

Construction
- Structure type: At-grade

Other information
- Station code: PHNPK
- Fare zone: Suburban 1

History
- Opened: 21 January 2008

Key dates
- 25 September 2011: Station renamed "Navan Road Parkway"
Location

Navan Road Parkway (Irish: Ollpháirc Bhóthar na hUaimhe) is a railway station in Fingal, Ireland. It is owned and operated by Iarnród Éireann.

== Location ==
The station is on the Dublin - Sligo railway line (see Rail transport in Ireland), located between Ashtown railway station and Castleknock railway station.

The station is adjacent to the Navan Road dual carriageway R147 road between the roundabout at the junction of Castleknock Road and Ashtown Road and the roundabout at the junction of Auburn Avenue and New Dunsink Lane. Access to the station is via a grade-separated junction off the R147.

== Design and services ==
Similar to both Dún Laoghaire railway station and Leixlip Louisa Bridge railway station, the station building is on the bridge that connects the two platforms. From here there are lifts and stairs down to each platform. It is an unstaffed station.

The station is served by Western Commuter services. Both main services (westbound to Maynooth and Longford and eastbound to Dublin city centre and Docklands branch services (from Clonsilla to Docklands) call at the station. InterCity services do not call at the station, although one can interchange at either Maynooth or Dublin Connolly railway station.

== History ==
It opened on 21 January 2008 as 'Phoenix Park' station but was renamed on 25 September 2011 to 'Navan Road Parkway'.

=== Renaming ===
The station was built by the developers of the Phoenix Park Racecourse Apartments on the site of the old Phoenix Park Racecourse. The station is further from the 1st phase of Phoenix Park than Ashtown Station, with the subsequent phases currently under construction better served by Navan Road Parkway.

The confusion over the name led to Iarnród Éireann erecting posters in Dublin Connolly railway station stating "For the Phoenix Park, use Ashtown Station".

With the start of the new railway timetable on 25 September 2011, the station was renamed Navan Road Parkway.

== See also ==
- List of railway stations in Ireland
- Rail transport in Ireland
- Dublin Suburban Rail

| Preceding station | Iarnród Éireann | Following station |
|---|---|---|
| Ashtown | Commuter; Western Commuter (City Branch) | Castleknock |
| Ashtown | Commuter; Western Commuter (Docklands Branch) | Castleknock |
| | Future | |
| Ashtown | DART; Line 1 | Castleknock |
