= Cabra, Dublin =

Northside suburb of Dublin, Ireland

Cabra An Chabrach (Irish)
- Suburb
- Location in Dublin Cabra (Ireland)
- Coordinates: 53°21′57″N 6°17′27″W
- Country: Ireland
- Province: Leinster
- County: Dublin
- Local authority: Dublin City Council

Population (2022)
  - Electoral division: 23,681
- Time zone: UTC+0 (WET)
  - Summer (DST): UTC+1 (IST (WEST))
- Eircode routing key: D07
- Irish Grid Reference: O133369

Cabra (Irish: An Chabrach, meaning 'the poor land') is an inner suburb on the northside of Dublin, Ireland. It is approximately 2 kilometres (1.2 mi) northwest of the city centre, in the administrative area of Dublin City Council. It was commonly known as Cabragh until the early 20th century. Largely located between the Royal Canal and the Phoenix Park, it is primarily a residential suburb, with a range of institutions and some light industry. Cabra is served by bus, tram and mainline rail; it lies across Navan Road, one of the main roads from central Dublin to the orbital motorway.

The population of all electoral divisions labelled as Cabra was 23,681 as of the 2022 census.

== History ==
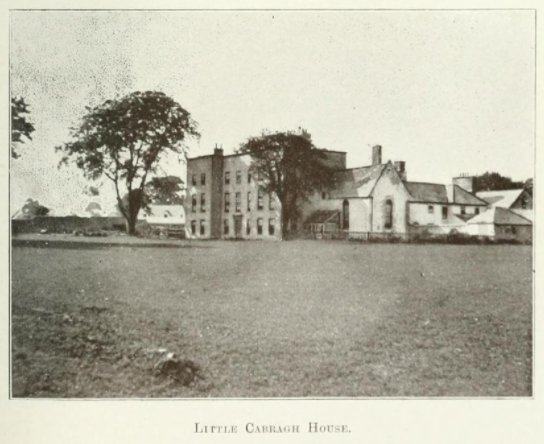
Little Cabragh House in the early 20th century

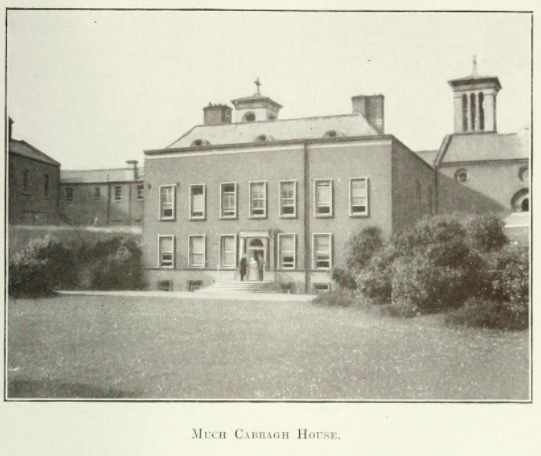
Much Cabragh House in the early 20th century

From about 1480, the manor of Cabra was held by a branch of the Plunket family, another branch of which was later ennobled as Earls of Fingall. The branch which held Cabragh had its main residence at Dunsoghly Castle near Finglas, which still exists.

There are three contiguous townlands called "Cabra", each in a different civil parish: Grangegorman, Glasnevin and Castleknock. The three met at the gate lodge of Little Cabragh House, today the location of the roundabout at the meeting of Ratoath Road and Fassaugh Avenue and the Canon Burke Senior Citizens Flats complex. Completed in 1598, Cabragh House was first occupied by the Segrave family. The mansion was then the home of the "hanging judge" Lord Norbury until he died in 1831 and the Segrave family managed to reacquire it. Charles Segrave, whose son was the famous racing driver Henry Segrave lived there until 1912. The big house was bought by Dublin Corporation by way of a compulsory purchase order in 1939 for the construction of local authority housing, and the historic house was razed to the ground.. Much Cabragh House was built by the Arthur family during the early eighteenth century. The red brick mansion house was built on the site of an earlier house. In 1819, the property was purchased by Dominican nuns and a number of schools were established on the site.

The Industrial Revolution brought the construction of the Royal Canal in 1790 and the laying of one railway line (a Great Southern and Western branch), both through the northern part of the area, while another railway line (the Great Western from Broadstone Terminus) ran through the heart of the area. The Great Southern and Western branch line even had a sideline for the North City Mills on the border of Cabra and Phibsboro. Due to the proximity of Broadstone, there were no local railway stations, the nearest being beyond Phibsboro, Glasnevin Station northeast of Cross Guns (then Westmoreland) Bridge.

From about 1880 to 1930, Cabra was a prominent market garden centre and a giant lairage, where cattle being brought to market at Hanlon's Corner were kept in pens and grazing fields; there was a set of cattle sidings on the GW&W Railway line to the east of Carnlough Road. Until the 1920s, 30s, and 40s, when large-scale public housing developments took place, the area mostly comprised fields and open countryside on the edge of the city. Many of the people who moved to the new suburb were from the city centre slums and tenement buildings who were then relocated to areas like Cabra and Crumlin. These large scale public housing schemes were a part of Dublin Corporations slum clearance efforts under the design of the architect Herbert Simms, who provided much needed housing for the working class of the city. Many families in Cabra today can trace their roots to this era.

Quarry Road was originally called Quarry Lane, after a small quarry which was situated near where the current statue of Our Blessed Lady is located at the roundabout with Fassaugh Road (originally Fassaugh Lane.) This quarry was filled in the early part of the 1900s and the family who lived in the Homestead grew cabbages on the reclaimed land.

== Geography ==
Cabra is located southwest of the Royal Canal, except for one small piece of land between the canal and railway line, and northeast of the Phoenix Park, and runs southeast to northwest, from Phibsboro at St. Peter's Church and around the sixth Royal Canal lock, and Grangegorman at Hanlon's Corner, to Ashtown and Pelletstown; across the canal are the districts of first Glasnevin and then Finglas. The area is often divided into Cabra East and Cabra West, with a notional line of division being the railway line coming from the Phoenix Park Tunnel and going to Connolly Station.

The Bradogue River, a tributary of the Liffey, rises underground at the southern edge of the district.

== Public transport ==
=== Bus ===
The two main Dublin Bus routes for the area are the 120 Ashtown via Cabra West/East to Parnell Street/Ballsbridge and 122 Ashington, Cabra West/East, City to Drimnagh. Routes 38/a/b serve Cabra Road, while 37, 39, 39a,70, 70n serve Navan Road. Route 11 and 11b travels the North Circular Road, part of Cabra's southern boundary. The N2 (Operated by Go-Ahead Ireland) travels through Nephin Road and Broombridge Road. Route L89 serves Broombridge Station.

=== Tram ===
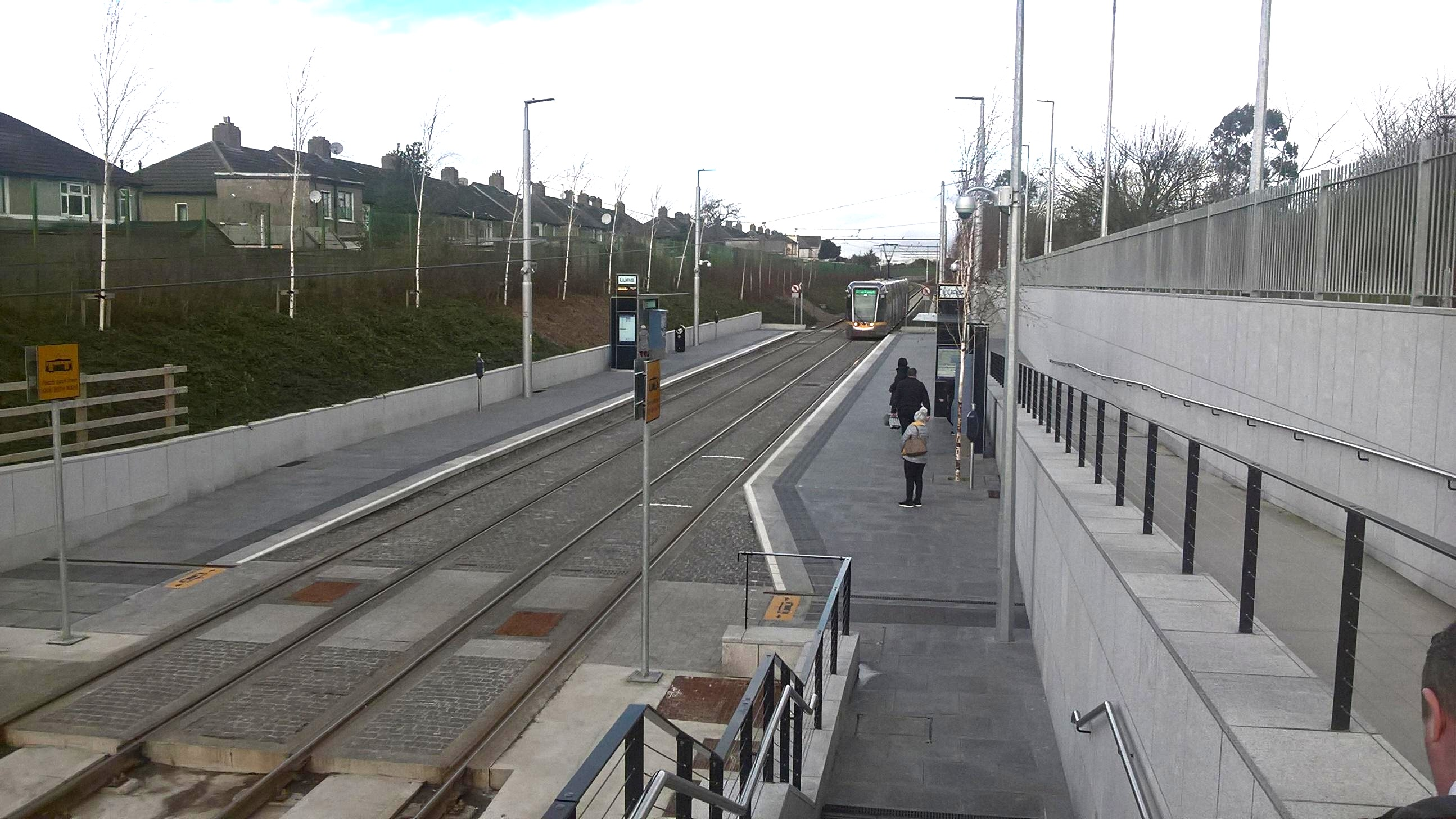
Cabra Luas stop

The Luas Green Line, part of Dublin's tram system, has three stops in Cabra, namely, broombridge terminus, Cabra and Grangegorman. The Green Line runs through the city centre and onwards to Cherrywood in South Dublin, with a connection in the city centre for services to West Dublin.

=== Mainline rail ===
There are suburban rail stops at Broombridge (which is also where the Luas terminates) and Pelletstown stations, providing rails services to Maynooth railway station, M3 Parkway railway station and stations in Dublin city centre such as Docklands railway station or Dublin Connolly railway station.

== Amenities, sports and organisations ==
Mount Bernard Park is a public park located in East Cabra. Its amenities include tennis courts, a basketball court, a 5-a-side football pitch, a playground and outdoor exercise equipment. At Cabra's western boundary lies the Phoenix Park, Ireland's largest urban park and home to the President of Ireland and Dublin Zoo. The Royal Canal runs through Cabra and has a parallel towpath for walking and cycling.

Naomh Fionnbarra GAA Club is located in Cabra, and has facilities for hurling, camogie and gaelic football.

The Order of Malta Ambulance Corps has a branch in the area, and has provided training in first-aid and nursing skills, and voluntary community care services for over 30 years. The related national youth organisation, the Order of Malta Cadets, is for 10- to 16-year-olds.

== Features ==
=== Broom Bridge ===
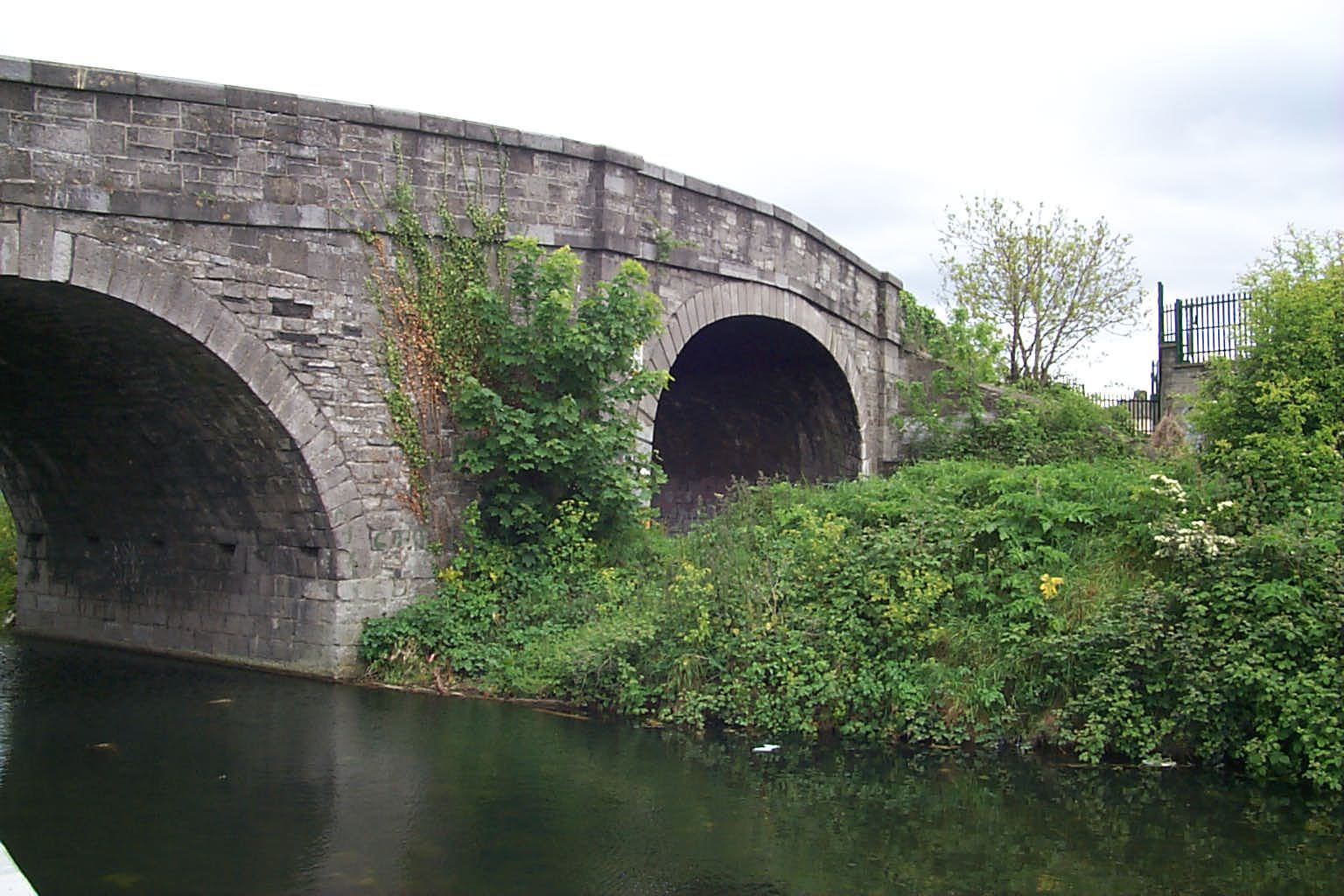
Broom Bridge

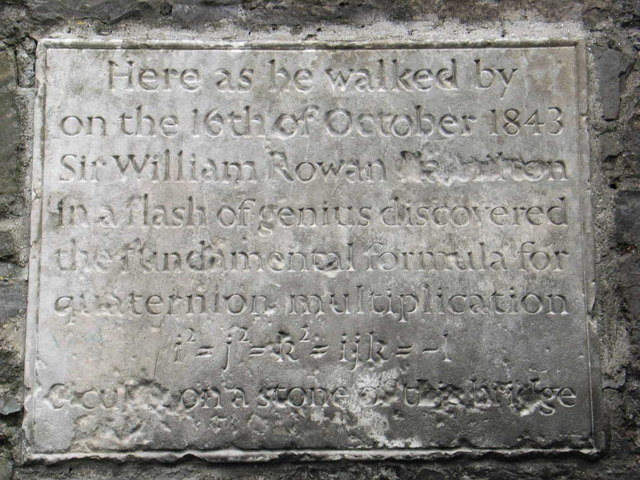
Plaque on Broom Bridge, commemorating where William Rowan Hamilton inscribed his formula for quaternions on 16 October 1843

Broom Bridge, also known as Brougham Bridge, is a small bridge along Broombridge Road which crosses the Royal Canal in Cabra. The bridge is named after William Broom, one of the directors of the Royal Canal Company. Broom Bridge is the location where Sir William Rowan Hamilton, following a 'eureka experience', first wrote down the fundamental formula for quaternions on 16 October 1843, which is to this day commemorated by a stone plaque on the northwest corner of the underside of the bridge. The text on the plaque reads:

Here as he walked by on the 16th of October 1843 Sir William Rowan Hamilton in a flash of genius discovered the fundamental formula for quaternion multiplication i^{2} = j^{2} = k^{2} = ijk = −1 and cut it on a stone of this bridge.

Given the historical importance of the mathematical contribution, mathematicians have been known to make a pilgrimage of sorts to the site.

=== Church of Christ the King ===
The Roman Catholic Church of Christ the King was opened in Cabra in 1933, following the Eucharistic Congress of Dublin (1932). John J. Robinson of Robinson and Keefe was asked to design the new church, as he had been the architect for all the structures (Phoenix Park, Merrion Road, O'Connell Bridge etc.) built for the Congress. The church is cross-shaped in plan and was built in red brick with a huge statue of Christ integrated into the tower, which is on the axis of the approach road. The church shares a number of features with St. Therese Mount Merrion which was designed by the same architect approximately 20 years later. Robinson was also the architect of Galway Cathedral.

=== Other buildings ===
Dublin city's public libraries have one of their administrative centres in the area, attached to Cabra Library; this Bibliographic Centre processes all books received and dispatches them to all branch libraries.

Deaf Village Ireland, formerly the School and Home for the Deaf, is located in a parkland setting in southern Cabra West. This facility is home to a range of Deaf organisations, including Deaf Sports Ireland.

Along the canal towards Liffey Junction, and serving the railway, was once a coke-making site, of which only some of the Coke Oven Cottages, formerly lying north and south of the canal, remain. Near the Sixth Lock was a pin mill on the site now occupied by 25–36 Shandon Mill (closer to the Fifth Lock and Cross Guns Bridge was a corn mill, at another time Mallet's Ironworks).

Cabra West is home to a number of factories, both in the industrial park and along Bannow Road. One such factory is the Batchelors beans factory.

== Education ==
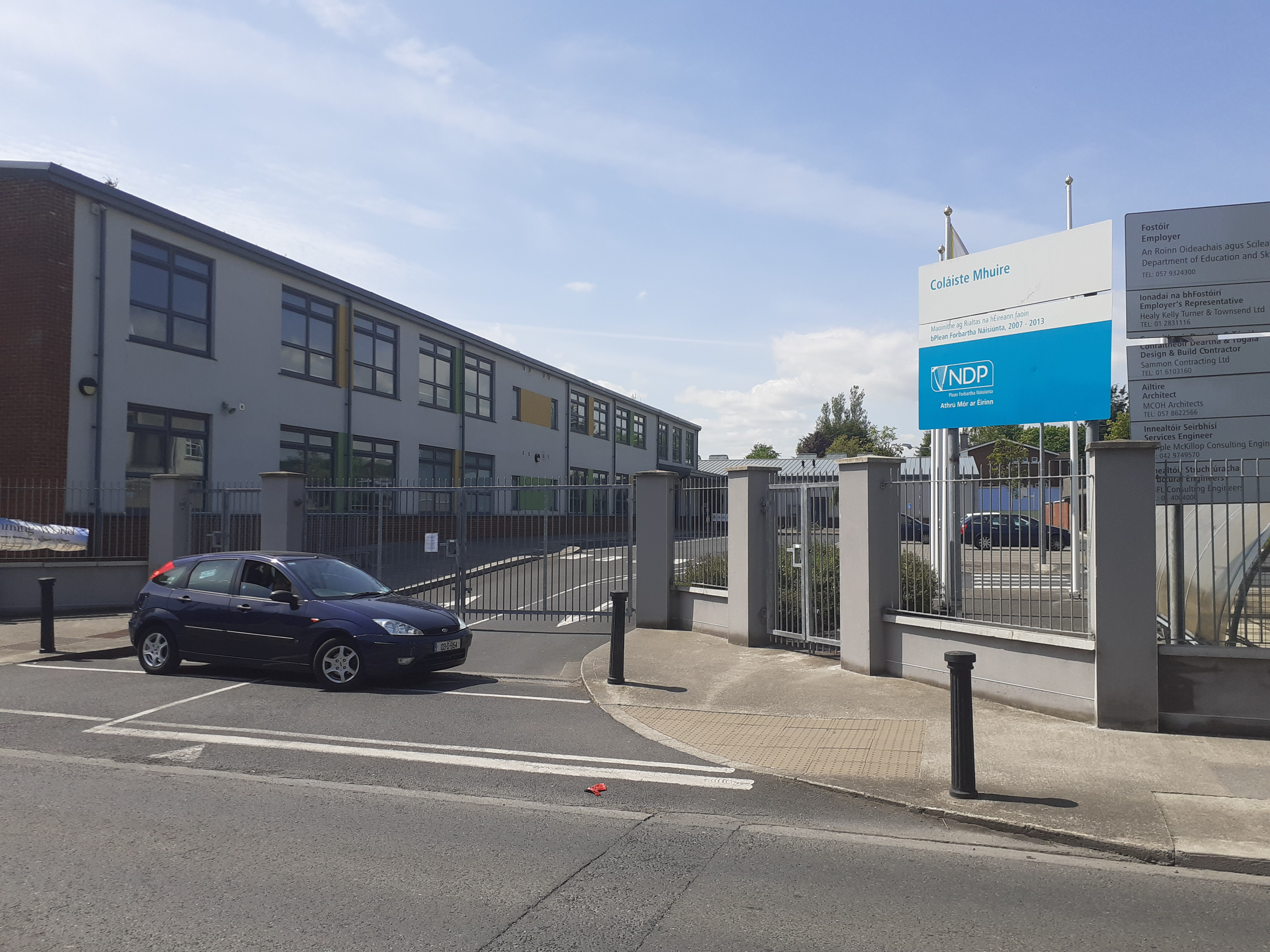
Coláiste Mhuire

Cabra is home to a number of secondary schools, including Coláiste Mhuire (Irish-medium, mixed sex), St. Declan's College (Catholic ethos, all-boys), St. Dominic's College (Catholic ethos, all-girls), and Cabra Community College (multidenominational, mixed sex).

Cabra also contains a number of primary schools, including Gaelscoil Bharra (Irish-medium, mixed sex), St Finbarr's BNS (Catholic ethos, all-boys), St Catherine's (Catholic ethos, all-girls), and Christ the King NS (Catholic ethos, all-girls).

Holy Family School for the Deaf offers both primary and secondary education for deaf and hearing-impaired students. Casa Caterina provides education for students with autism or severe emotional and behavioural difficulties.

Pre-school institutions in Cabra include Naíonra Bharra (Irish-medium), located on the Gaelscoil Bharra campus.

== Notable people ==
Notable people from Cabra include singer-songwriter Eleanor McEvoy, world champion boxer Steve Collins, author and journalist Gene Kerrigan, actors Michael Gambon and Frank Grimes, actress and singer Angeline Ball, singer Dickie Rock, rapper Kojaque and multi-time WWE world champion Sheamus (real name Stephen Farrelly).

Numerous footballers hail from Cabra, including Republic of Ireland international goalkeeper Wayne Henderson, Éamonn Fagan and Liam Whelan, both from St. Attracta Road. Whelan was one of the Manchester United Busby Babes who died in the Munich air disaster of 1958, and Connaught Bridge was later renamed in his memory. Roddy Collins, former manager of Bohemians, Shamrock Rovers and Maltese side Floriana, lived in Cabra before being appointed manager of Cork City. Brothers Jimmy Conway former Fulham and Manchester City player, and John Conway also a former Fulham player, were both born in Ventry Park.

Éamonn Dillon is a hurler from Cabra who plays for Dublin GAA's senior team as well as his club, Naomh Fionnbarra GAA.

The suburb's most infamous former resident was John Toler, 1st Earl of Norbury, otherwise known as the hanging judge, who lived at Cabragh House on the corner of the present-day Fassaugh Avenue and Ratoath Road. Another judge, with a far less villainous reputation who also lived in Cabra, was Sir Ambrose Forth (died 1610) judge of the Irish Court of Admiralty. He did not much enjoy living in Cabra, judging by his letters complaining about his "poor little farm house" there.

The noted mathematician, William Rowan Hamilton, who freed algebra from the commutative postulate of multiplication (that the order or sequence of factors does not determine the result), is commemorated by a plaque at Broom Bridge.
