= Corduff =

Suburb of Dublin, Ireland

Corduff An Chorr Dhubh (Irish)
- Suburb
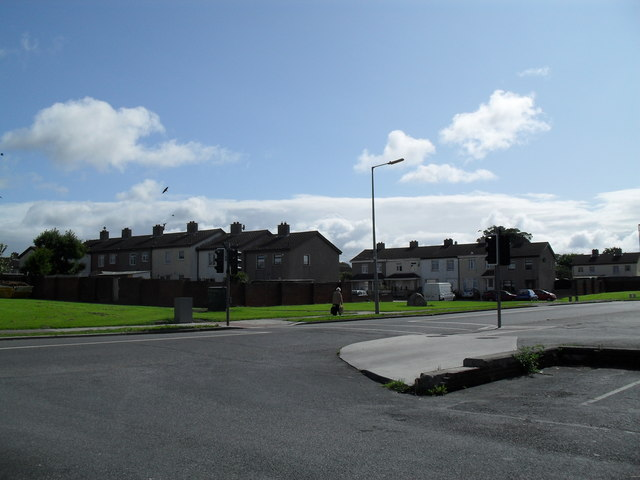
- Houses at Blackcourt Avenue in Corduff

- Location in Ireland
- Coordinates: 53.398057°N 6.371681°W
- Country: Ireland
- Province: Leinster
- County: County Dublin
- Local government area: Fingal
- Dáil constituency: Dublin West
- EU Parliament constituency: Dublin
- Eircode routing key: D15
- Dialing code: 01, +353 1

Corduff (Irish: An Chorr Dhubh) is a northwestern suburb of Dublin, Ireland, 10 km from Dublin city centre. It is a part of the wider Blanchardstown area and is in the Dublin 15 postal district. As of 2016, the electoral division of Blanchardstown–Corduff had a population of 3,871.

Corduff is also a townland in the civil parish of Castleknock, in the traditional County Dublin.

== History ==
One of the earliest references to Corduff is in a document from the reign of Edward VI, dated 2 August 1547, which records a "lease to James Walshe of London, gent., of the rectory of Malahydert, County Dublin, and the tithes &c. in Malahydert, Culduff, Bossardston, Pasloweston...Tyrrolstown, Abbatiston..."

=== Evolution of name ===
The name for Corduff and the area has varied over time. The form Culduff and significantly, Cooleduff (this last in the census of 1659) is the predominant one down to the early years of the 18th century. In the Civil Survey, compiled in the mid-1650s is found a notice of "Colduff, ½ a plowland, 143 acres (0.58 km^{2}), [property of] Will. Warren, Irish Papist ... There is upon ye premisses a stone house slated, one barne and stable tathct, severall cottages ... a small orchard and garden with a grove of ash trees, one mill in use worth Anno 1640 ten pounds per annum. The Tythes belong to ye Colledge of Dublin [i.e. Trinity College]. Bounded east with Davistowne, south with ye Toulchy, on ye west with Buzardstown, on ye north with Ballicolan".

The Hearth Money Roll for County Dublin lists the householders liable for payment of hearth tax in Corduff in 1664 as" Cullduff: William Warren (5 hearths), William Dardy, Peter Heward, William Lacey, John Synnott, Nicholas Wade, James Dardis, Daniell Shar, William Dardis, Marke Talbott (1 hearth each). Cullduff Mill: Pierce Barrett (1 hearth)".

These name forms likely represented the Irish Cúil Dubh, which is translated roughly as 'the black place' – possibly referring to the colour of the soil.

The picture is complicated by the appearance of 'r' in place of 'l' in the names of some 17th-century sources. In Sir William Petty's great survey (the Down Survey), carried out for the Cromwellian regime in the 1650s, the name appears as Curduf, and in Petty's atlas, Hiberniae Delineatio, (1685), it is spelt Curduffe.

Early 18th-century documents recorded the gradual establishment of Corduff as the accepted form of the name. In 1708 is found Culduffe alias Curduffe, by 1722 Corduffe alias Courtduffe. By 1750 Corduff and the more anglicised Courtduffe were still vying for acceptance, but, Corduff is the form which appears on Rocque's map of County Dublin, 1760. Its supremacy was virtually assured when it was adopted for inclusion on the Ordnance Survey map of 1843.

The Ordnance Survey namebook describes the place about 1840: "... the property of four sisters divided into farms, the soil is of rather a light gravelly kind principally under tillage; a small bye-road runs N & S thro' it; there are several small open gravel-pits in it, and 3 small forts. A very crooked river runs along its SW side; there are a few dwellings in this townland, but very miserable ...". One of the ringforts mentioned still exists in Corduff Park and is known locally as “the fairy-ring”.

With virtually all other Corduffs throughout Ireland, the name represents the Irish An Chorr Dhubh. The first element 'corr' may mean hollow or pit, or a rounded hill or hump. Either of these meanings could conceivably apply to Corduff, e.g. "the pit-like depression the River Tolka runs through", or some elevated part of the townland which would have been more apparent before the area was built over.

=== Richard Warren ===
The landed estate at Corduff was initially home to the de la Field family, and later acquired by the Warren family. One member of the Warren family, Richard Warren, son of John “the old Lion of Corduff” was born in Corduff House in 1705. He emigrated to France as a young man along with his brothers John and William and joined the Irish Brigade of the French army as a volunteer captain. It was in France that he met the Jacobite Prince Charles Edward (Bonnie Prince Charlie). Warren organised the ship to take the prince to Scotland. When, sometime later, Warren landed in Scotland he was conferred the rank of colonel in Prince Charles's army of Scotland and the aide-de-camp to Lord George Murray. Baron Richard Warren of Corduff died in 1774.

=== Modern development ===
The townland of Corduff (including Corduff House) eventually ended up in the possession of the Egan family, who were the last owners before the commencement of the more modern housing developments.

On 1 December 1974, two showhouses were built in Edgewood Lawns as the starting point for Corduff as the No.1 "Neighbourhood Area" in the Blanchardstown Development Plan. The provision of services followed and during the next two years, Corduff Park and Grove as well as Brookhaven developed.

=== Ecclesiastical history ===
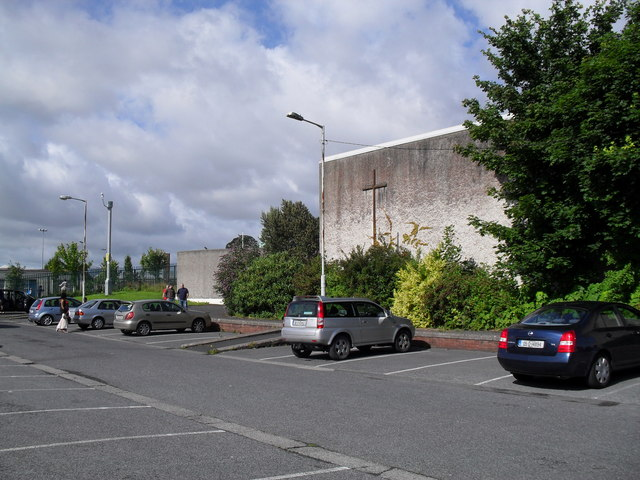
St. Patrick's Church, Corduff

Corduff is a parish in the Blanchardstown deanery of the Roman Catholic Archdiocese of Dublin. In the 19th century, the Roman Catholic parish of Blanchardstown encompassed much of the area now within the Dublin 15 postal district.

Following the relaxation of the penal laws, it became possible for Catholic adherents to consider the construction of additional churches and to repair the existing stock of religious buildings. St Brigid's Church, Blanchardstown, not to be confused with a Church of Ireland building in nearby Castleknock, was constructed in 1837 upon the foundation of a church that had been built prior to 1731. It is the mother church of 12 other parish churches as new parishes were constituted out of it over the following 156 years. In 1976, St Patrick's Church in Corduff was separated from Blanchardstown. Several years later, the parish of St Philip, the Apostle, in Mountview, was in turn separated from Corduff, and the parish of Mary of the Servants, Blakestown, was separated from Corduff in the late 1970s.

A Kingdom Hall of the Jehovah's Witnesses and a mosque are also present in the locality.

== Education ==
Schools in the area include St. Patrick's Junior and Senior national schools, and Rath Dara Community College secondary school. The Technological University Dublin campus in Blanchardstown is also in the area (a successor to the Institute of Technology, Blanchardstown).

== Transport ==
Corduff is served by Dublin Bus route numbers 220 and 236, and night-bus route 39n. Corduff is also walking distance from Blanchardstown Village and the Blanchardstown Centre (and the bus routes which serve those areas), as well as Damastown and Ballycoolin Business Parks. The National Aquatic Centre and Crowne Plaza Hotel are also nearby.

== Sport ==
Corduff Football Club is one of several soccer clubs in Blanchardstown with teams representing different ages and levels.

Corduff Shotokan Karate Club was started in 1990, and is affiliated with the United Shotokan Karate Federation (USKF).
