= Ashtown railway station =

Railway station in Dublin, Ireland

Ashtown Baile an Ásaigh
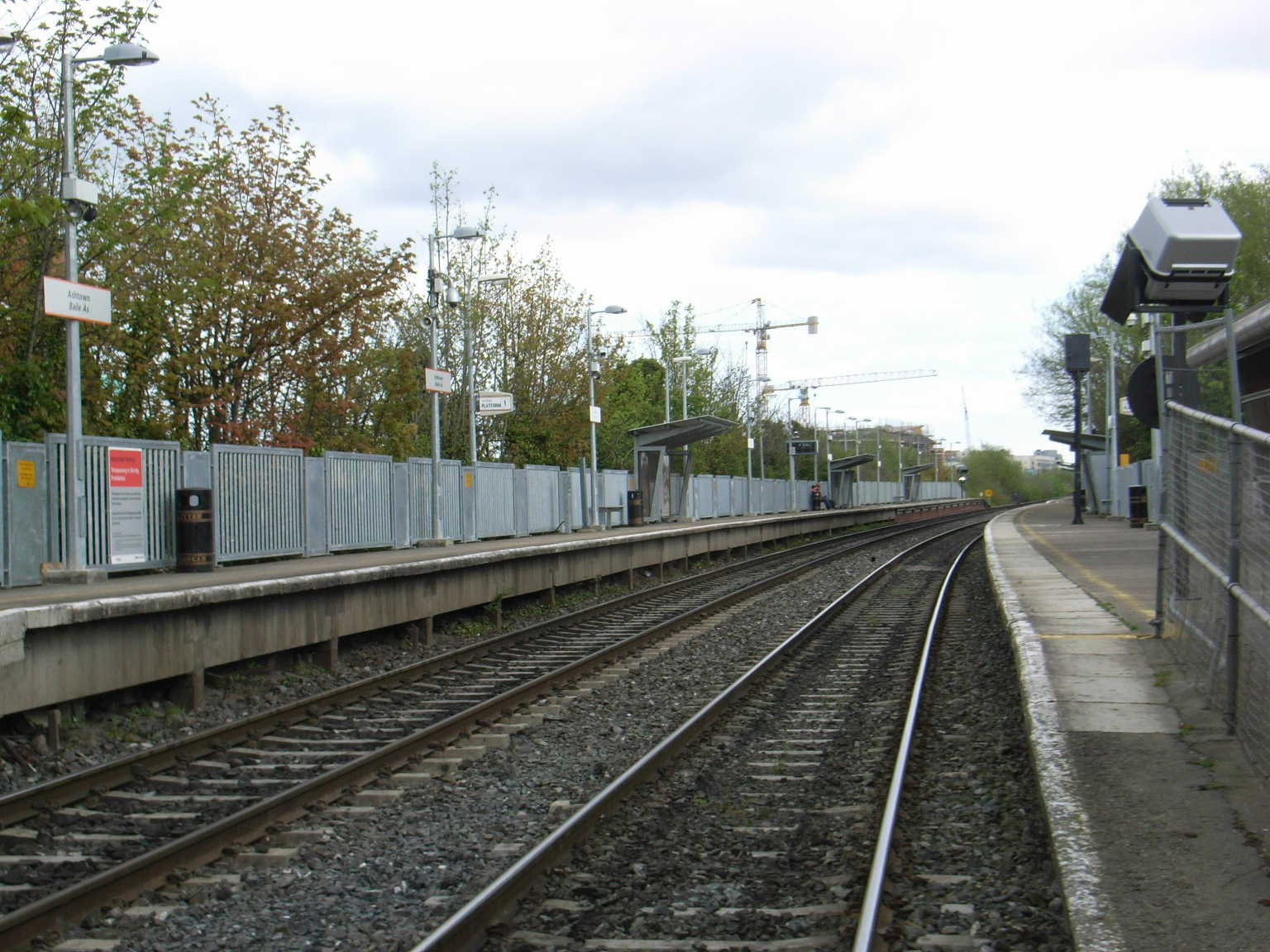
- Ashtown Station looking East in 2007

General information
- Location: Ashtown Road, Ashtown; Dublin, D15 EH48; Ireland
- Coordinates: 53.3753°N 6.3323°W
- Owner: Iarnród Éireann
- Operator: Iarnród Éireann
- Platforms: 2
- Tracks: 2

Construction
- Structure type: At-grade

Other information
- Station code: ASHTN
- Fare zone: Suburban 1

Key dates
- 28 July 1847: Station opens as private stop
- 1902: Station opens fully
- 1934: Station closes
- 29 September 1979: Station reopens temporarily
- 30 September 1979: Station closes
- 11 January 1982: Station reopens
Location

Ashtown is a commuter railway station in Fingal, Ireland on the Dublin Connolly to Maynooth and Docklands to M3 Parkway commuter services.

It serves the Ashtown area of Dublin and is near the Ashtown roundabout on the Navan Road (R147).

Navan Road Parkway (formerly Phoenix Park) opened nearby in 2008 but does not replace Ashtown. A major grade-separated junction was built on the R147 to provide access to Navan Road Parkway.

The ticket office is open from 06:30 to 16:00, Monday to Friday. It is closed on Saturday and Sunday.

== History ==
The station was opened by the Midland Great Western Railway in 1847 for race specials at the now-demolished Phoenix Park Racecourse. It opened fully on 1 August 1902. Absorbed into the Great Southern Railways by way of the Railways (Great Southern) Preliminary Amalgamation Scheme of 12 November 1924 (SI no. 31 of that year), the station closed in 1934.

The line through the station was then nationalised, passing on to Córas Iompair Éireann as a result of the Transport Act 1944 which took effect from 1 January 1945. Under this management, it reopened briefly in 1979 for the visit of Pope John Paul II to Ireland in order to facilitate the large numbers who attended the open-air mass in the Phoenix Park and reopened permanently on 11 January 1982. It passed on to Iarnród Éireann in 1987.

The footbridge came from Midleton on the Youghal line.

== See also ==
- List of railway stations in Ireland

Preceding station	IÉ	Following station
Pelletstown	Commuter; Western Commuter	Navan Road Parkway
Pelletstown	{{{route2}}}	Navan Road Parkway
	Future	
Pelletstown	DART; Line 1	Navan Road Parkway
	Disused railways	
Liffey Junction; Line open, station closed	Midland Great Western Railway; Dublin-Galway/Sligo	Clonsilla
