= M3 Parkway railway station =

Railway station in County Meath, Ireland

M3 Parkway Ollpháirc M3
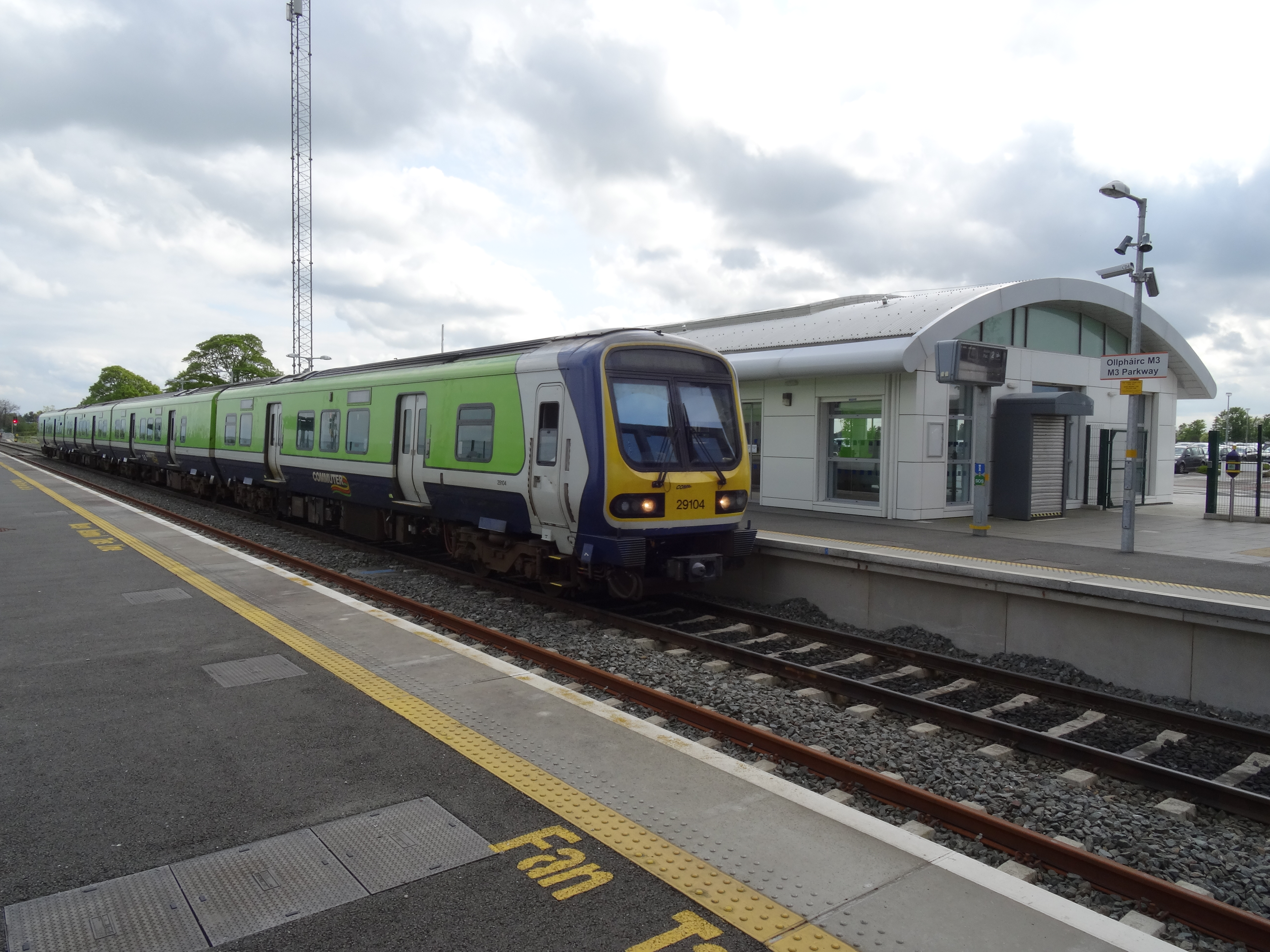

General information
- Location: Bennetstown, Dunboyne, County Meath, A86 DK28; Ireland
- Coordinates: 53°26′05.5″N 6°28′08.3″W
- System: Commuter Rail Station
- Owner: Iarnród Éireann
- Operator: Iarnród Éireann
- Line: Commuter
- Platforms: 2
- Tracks: 2

Construction
- Structure type: At-grade
- Parking: 1,200 spaces
- Accessible: Yes

Other information
- Station code: M3WAY
- Fare zone: Suburban 3

History
- Opened: 3 September 2010
Route map
Location

M3 Parkway is a park and ride railway station in County Meath beside Dunboyne and the M3 Motorway (Pace Interchange Junction 5).

It is the terminus station on the Docklands to M3 Parkway Western Commuter service (during peak times Monday to Friday) and Clonsilla to M3 Parkway shuttle Commuter service at all other times.

It mainly serves as a large park and ride site, with 1,200 free car park spaces.

The station is not served by any bus routes.

== History ==
In 2005, the Irish Government announced that, as part of its Transport 21 plan, the rail line between Clonsilla and Navan would be reopened for passenger trains in two phases. This line had closed in 1963. Phase 1 of the project involved reopening the section between Clonsilla and M3 Parkway, which would serve as the terminus until Phase 2 extended the line to Navan. M3 Parkway station opened on 3 September 2010 as part of Phase 1.

Plans for Phase 2, which proposed to extend the rail line to Navan, have been delayed. Originally slated for completion in 2015, as of 2026 it was proposed that the line could be completed between 2030 and 2035. If developed as proposed, the extension would involve approximately 40 kilometers of new track and include stations at Dunshaughlin and Kilmessan. As of 2024, the project was in the development phase, with a focus on design and route selection, with public consultations expected in the following two years.

Additionally, the DART+ West project was approved, which would extend the DART network to M3 Parkway. This proposed extension includes electrification and re-signalling of the existing rail lines, enhancing service frequency and capacity to accommodate growing commuter demand from the station.

== Services ==
=== Train services ===
Peak times Monday to Friday: Passengers can travel directly between M3 Parkway and Dunboyne, Hansfield, Clonsilla, Coolmine, Castleknock, Navan Road Parkway, Ashtown, Broombridge and Dublin Connolly or Docklands.

All other times including all day Saturday and Sunday: Passengers can travel directly between M3 Parkway and Dunboyne, Hansfield, and Clonsilla but need to transfer at Clonsilla for services to Maynooth or Dublin city centre in order to travel to any other stations.

Preceding station	Iarnród Éireann	Following station
Dunboyne	Commuter; Western Commuter	Terminus
	Proposed	
Dunboyne	Commuter; Dublin-Navan railway line	Dunshaughlin
Dunboyne	DART; DART+ West (M3 Parkway Branch)	Terminus

=== Bus services ===
The station is not served by any bus routes.

== Station name ==
There was uncertainty over the station's name, as it variously appears as Pace M3, M3 Park and Ride, and Pace (M3 Park and Ride). Unlike the preceding Dunboyne station, there was no previous station at this location. Since the Summer of 2010, signs in the station display the current name M3 Parkway.

== See also ==
- List of railway stations in Ireland
