= Pelletstown railway station =

Railway station in Dublin, Ireland

Pelletstown Baile Pheiléid
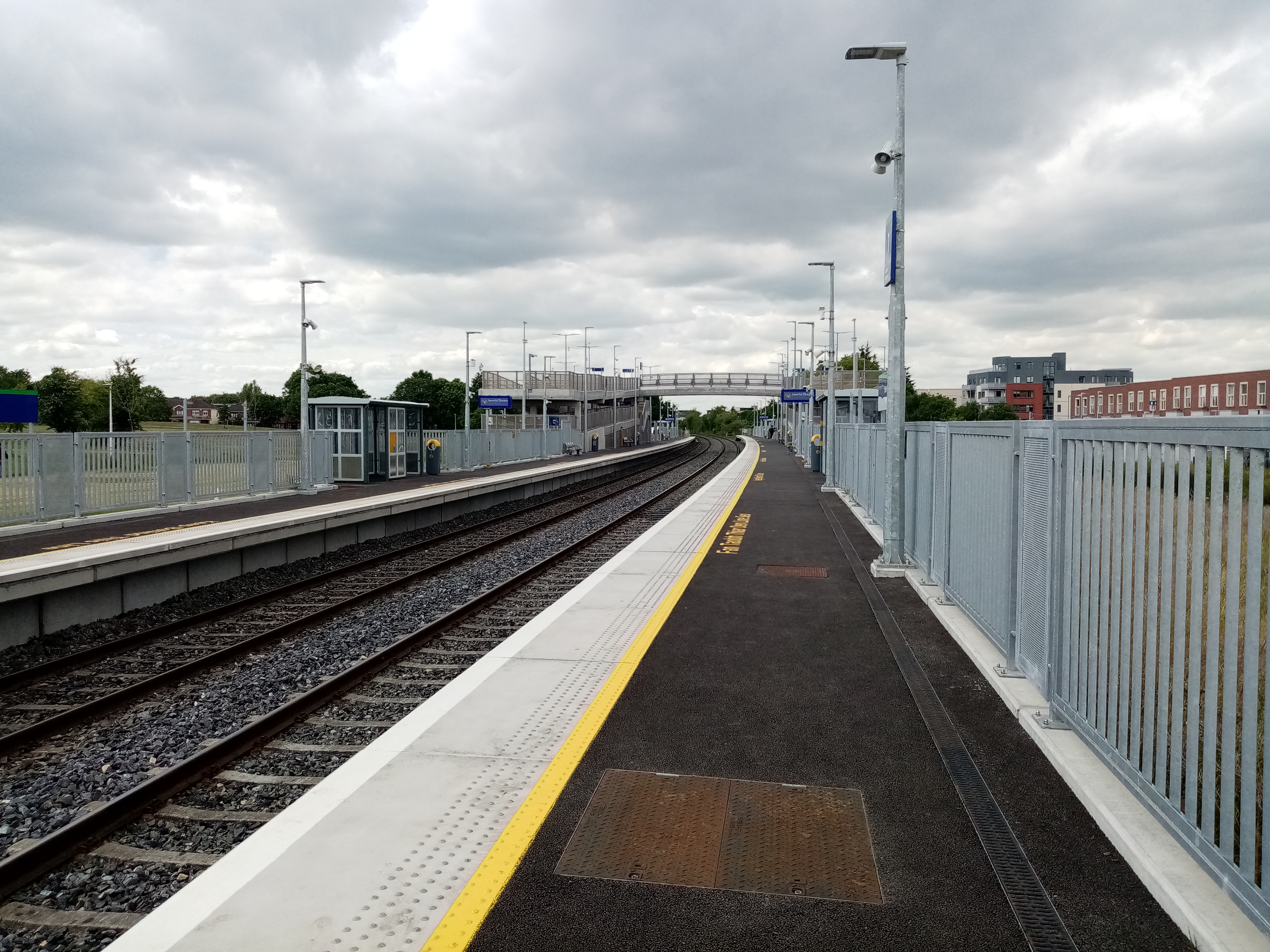
- Pelletstown station viewed from the east end of Platform 1.

General information
- Location: Cabra, Dublin 7 Ireland
- Coordinates: 53.3755°N 6.3169°W
- Owner: Iarnród Éireann
- Operator: Iarnród Éireann
- Platforms: 2

Construction
- Structure type: At-grade
- Accessible: Yes

Other information
- Fare zone: Suburban 1
- Website: www.irishrail.ie/en-ie/station/pelletstown

History
- Opened: 26 September 2021
Location

Pelletstown railway station is a railway station on the Western Commuter line in the Cabra area of Dublin, Ireland, beside the Royal Canal. The station was opened on 26 September 2021 by Minister for Transport Eamon Ryan and Tánaiste Leo Varadkar, becoming the first new station to open on the Iarnród Éireann network since Oranmore railway station opened in 2013.

Planning permission was originally granted in 2014, with modified permission approved in 2018. In 2018, Iarnród Éireann stated that construction would begin in 2019, but the groundbreaking did not take place until February 2020. As of early 2020, the project was projected to cost €10-€10.5 million.

The station is adjacent to the 8th Lock residential quarter development, owned by German investor Union Investment.

Pedestrians and cyclists can use the station to circumnavigate the Royal Canal, using the station's footbridge to go between Royal Canal Avenue and Ashington Park.

The station takes its name from the townland of Pelletstown. This name traces back to the Middle Ages: Piletiston is recorded on the Close Roll of King Edward III c. 1375, the name meaning the tūn (settlement) of Ralph Pedelowe.

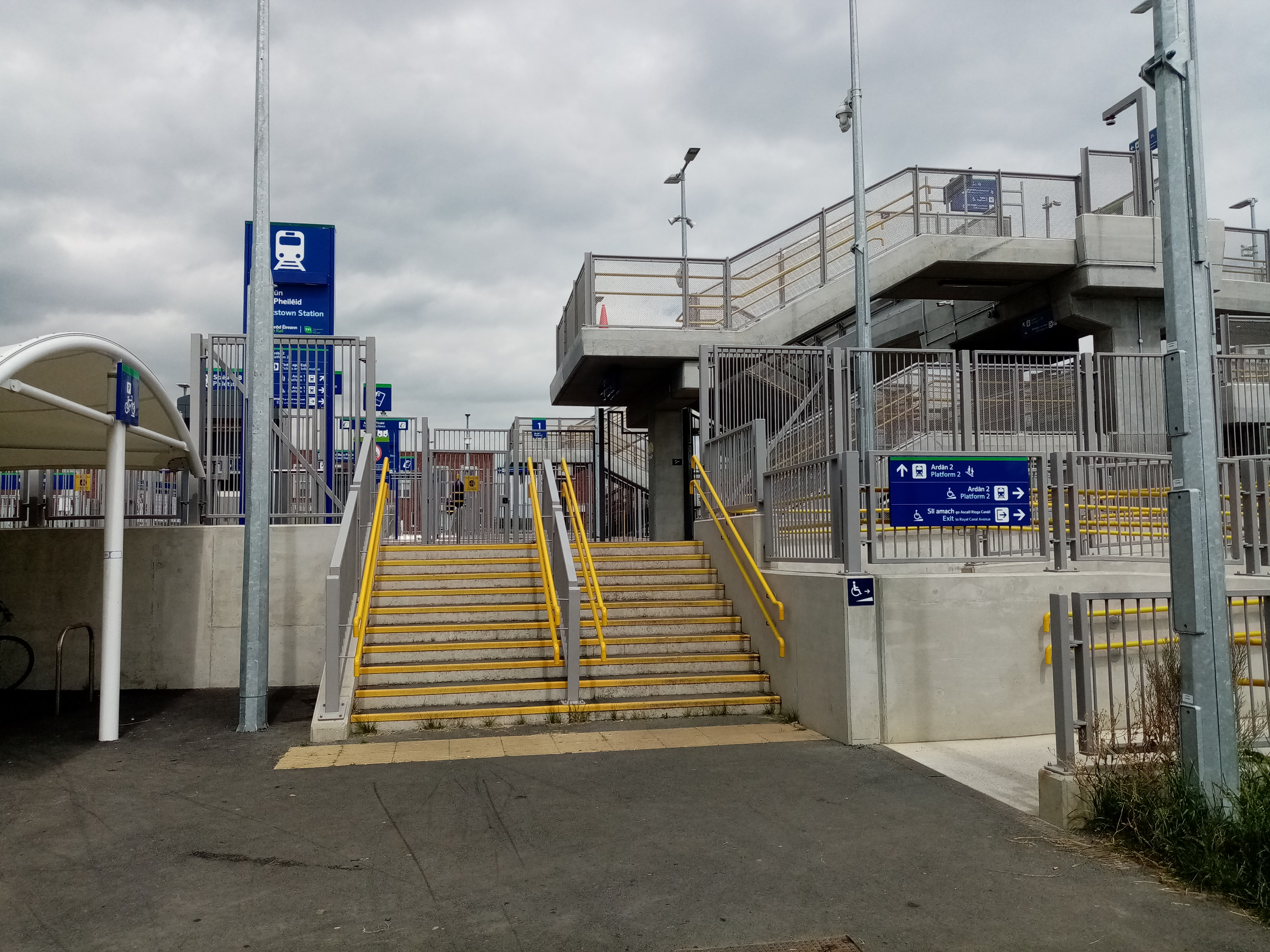
Pelletstown's Ashington Park entrance, located on the south side of the station.

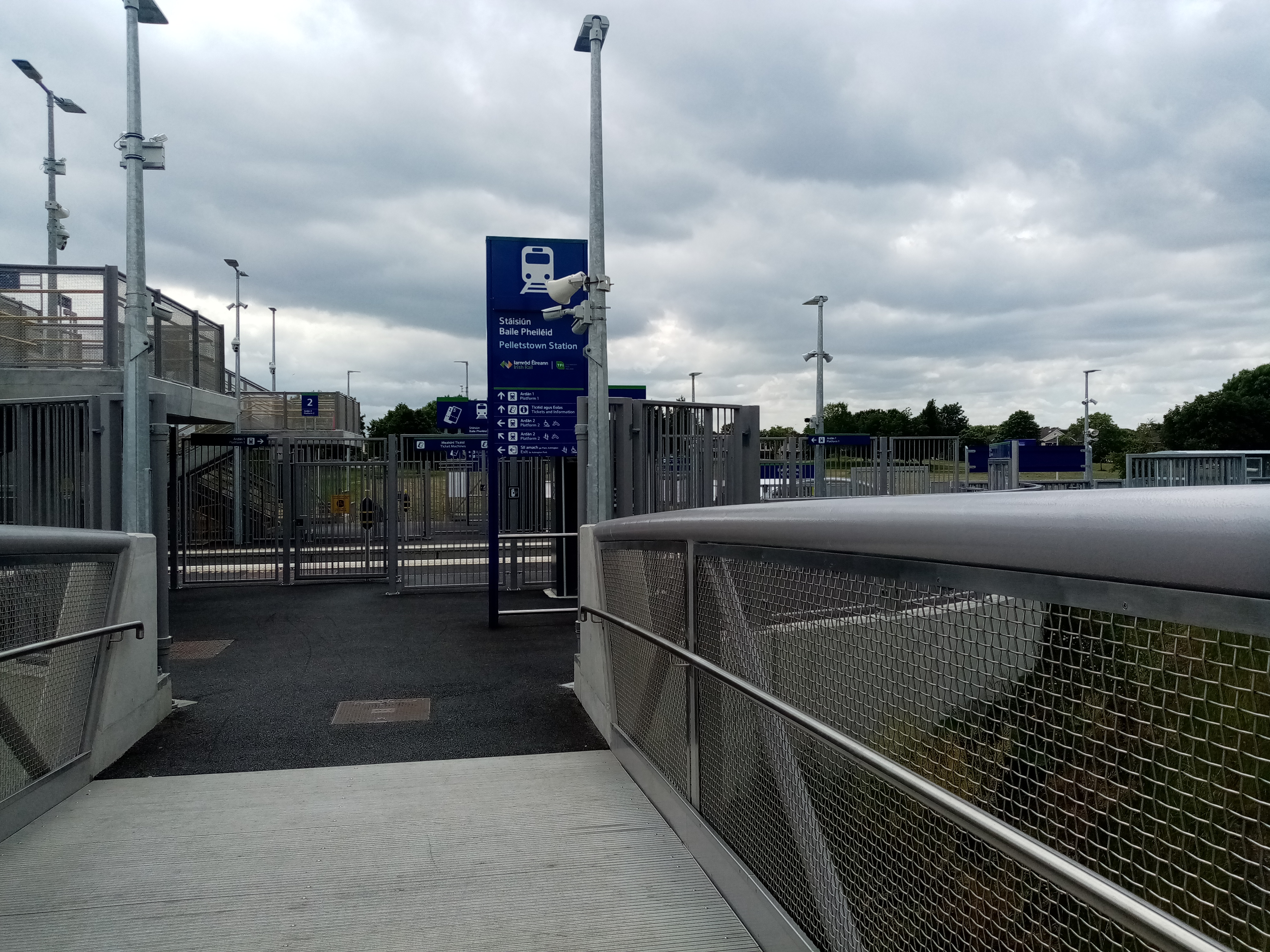
The station's other entrance, on Royal Canal Avenue.

Preceding station	Iarnród Éireann	Following station
Broombridge	Commuter; Western Commuter	Ashtown
