= Castleknock railway station =

Railway station in Dublin, Ireland

Castleknock Caisleán Cnucha
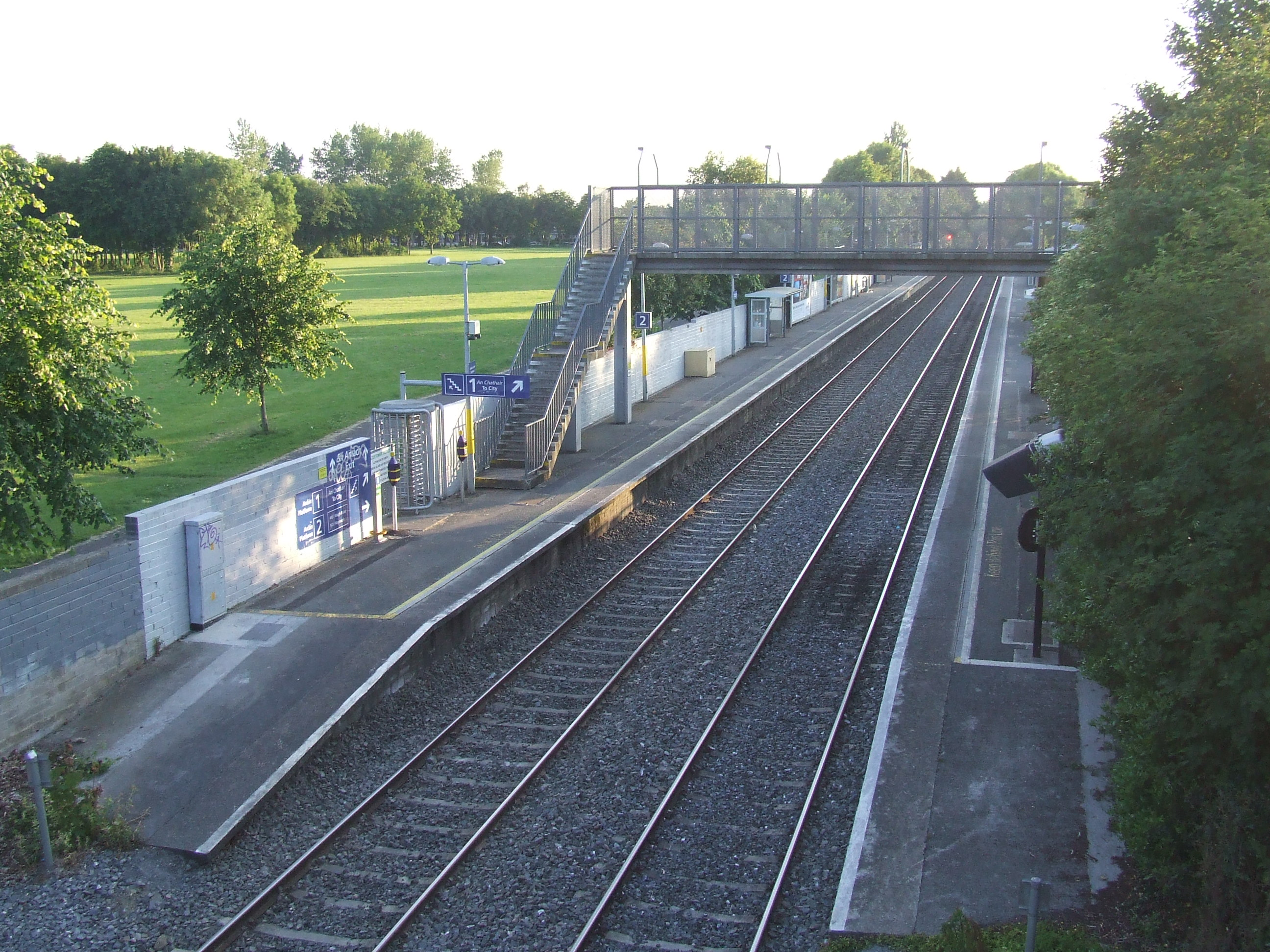
- Castleknock Station looking West in June 2014

General information
- Other names: Blanchardstown Castleknock
- Location: Castleknock Road, Dublin 15, D15 CX21; Ireland
- Coordinates: 53.382°N 6.371°W
- Owner: Iarnród Éireann
- Operator: Iarnród Éireann
- Platforms: 2

Construction
- Structure type: At-grade

Other information
- Station code: CNOCK
- Fare zone: Suburban 2

History
- Opened: 2 July 1990

Key dates
- 2000: Station refurbished
- 2012: Station upgraded
Location

Castleknock is a railway station that serves the suburban centres of Castleknock and Blanchardstown in Fingal, Ireland.

It lies on the Dublin to Longford commuter route and is served by Western Commuter services from Pearse Station to Maynooth and Docklands to M3 Parkway.

== Description ==
The station is parallel to the Royal Canal near the 12th lock. It has two through platforms. It originally featured a portacabin booking office; however, a permanent station building was constructed (and the platforms lengthened) as part of the upgrade of the Western Commuter service in 2000. The ticket office is no longer staffed.

The station was further upgraded in 2012 with new shelters and signage.

== History ==
The station opened on 2 July 1990.

== Gallery ==
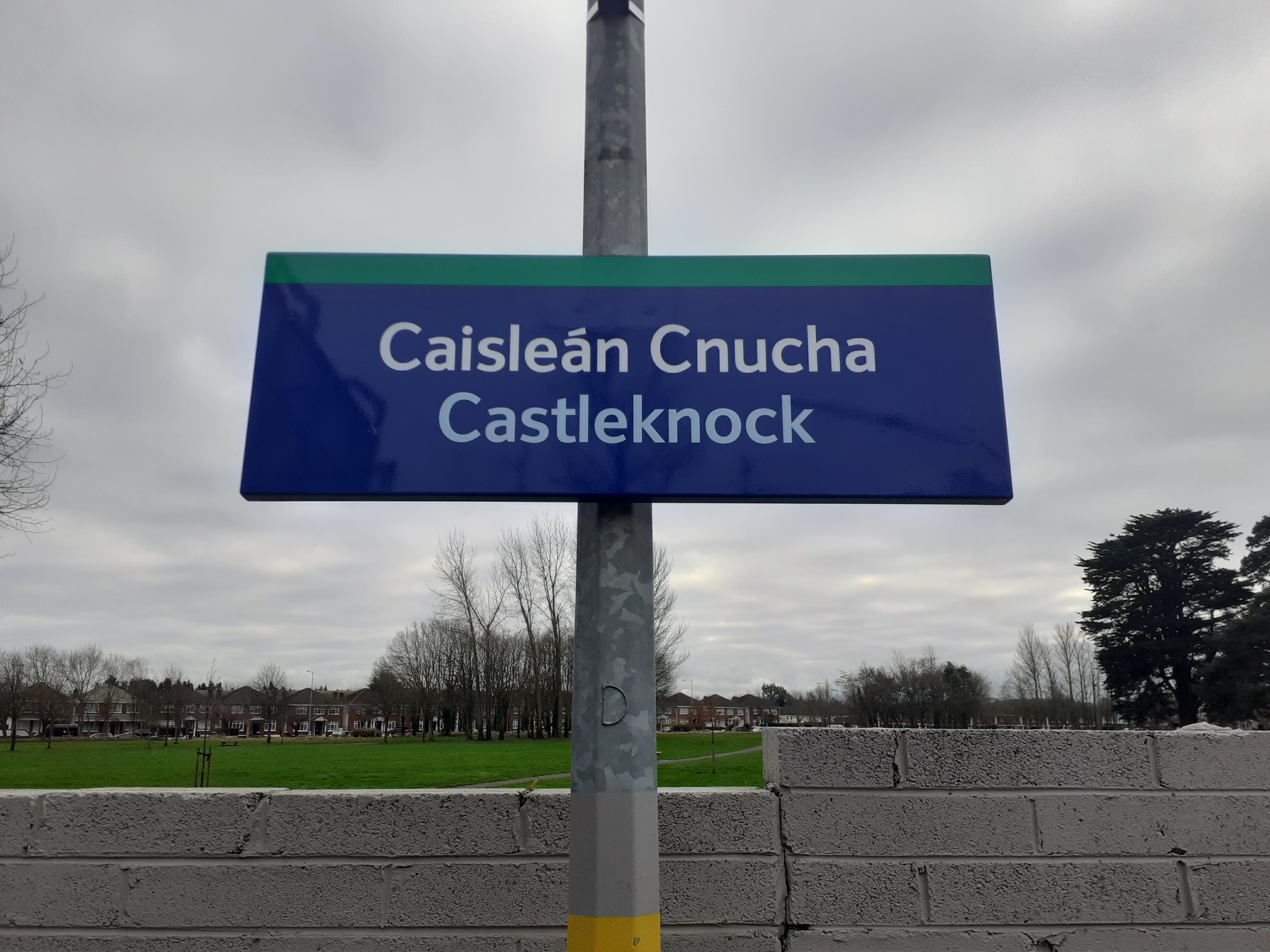

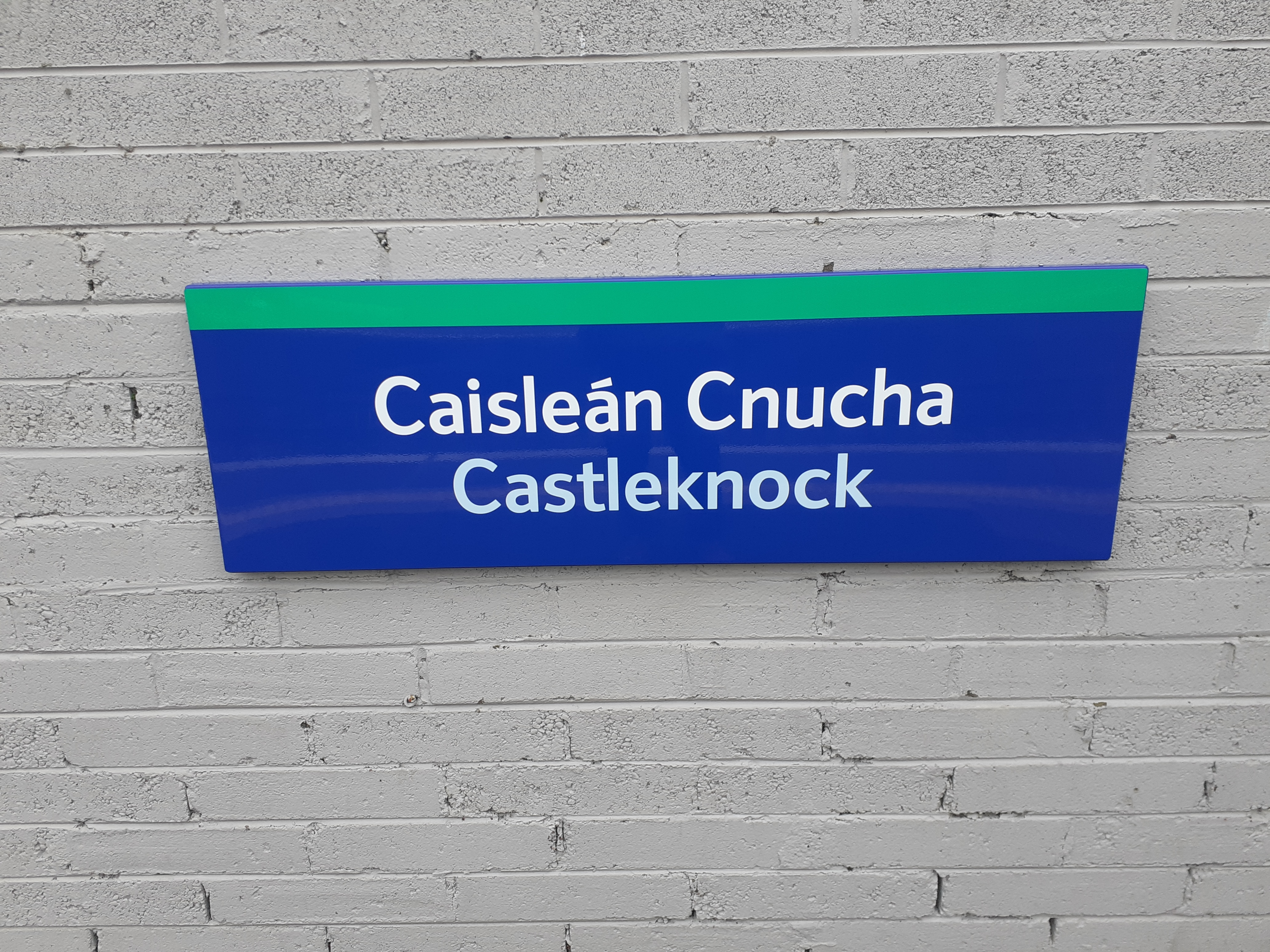

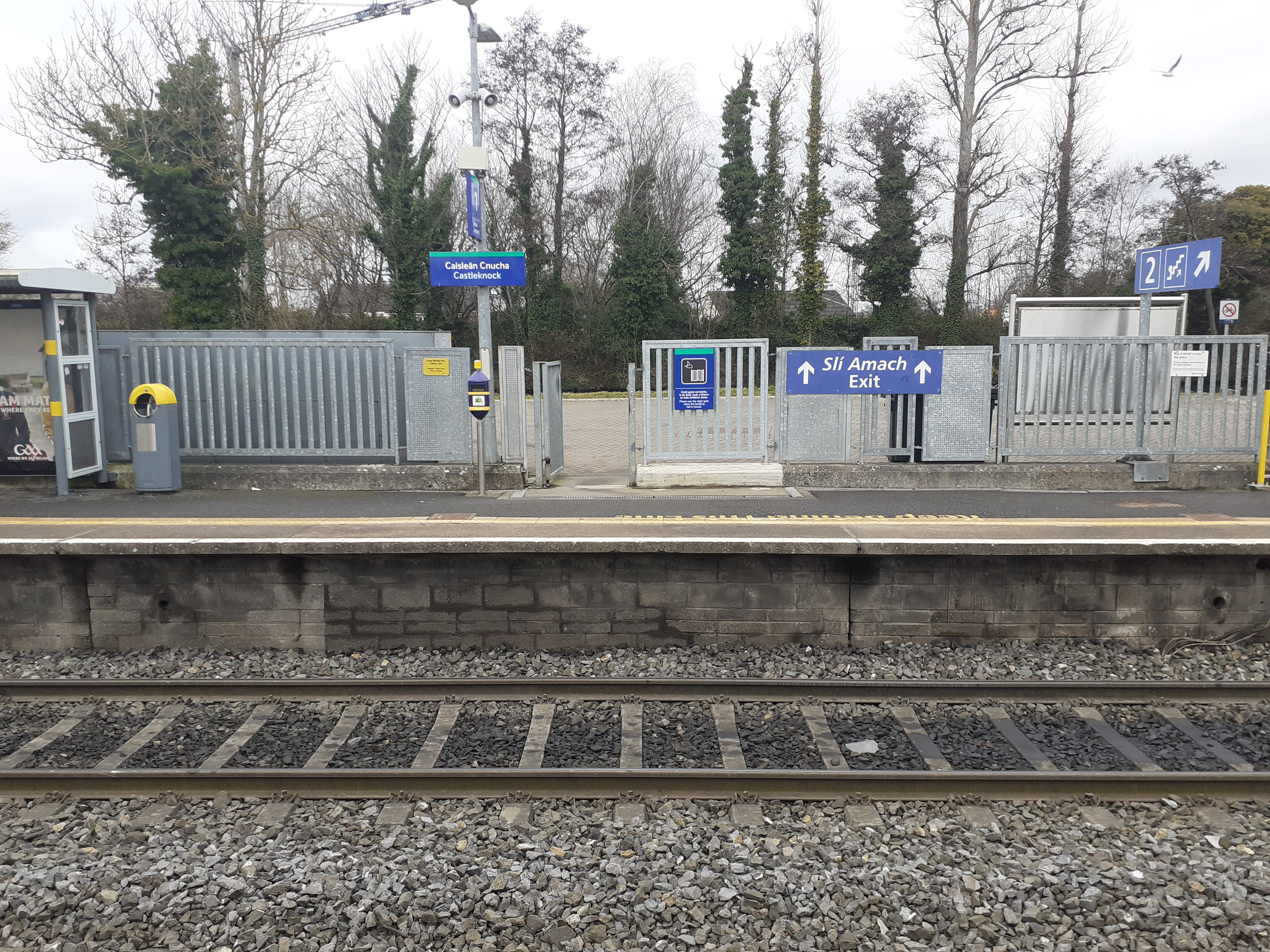

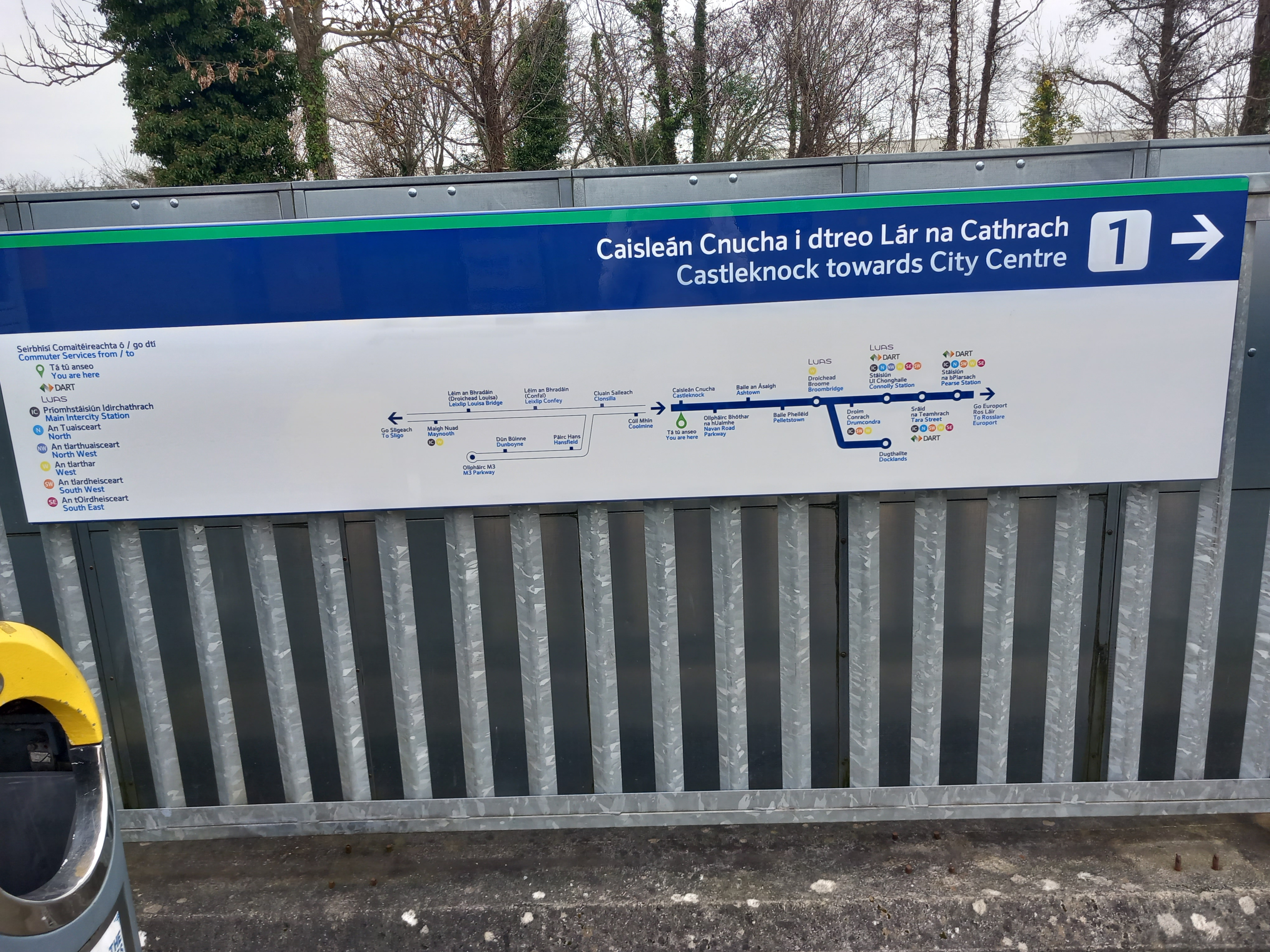

== See also ==
- List of railway stations in Ireland
- Rail transport in Ireland

Preceding station	Iarnród Éireann	Following station
Navan Road Parkway	Commuter; Western Commuter; Line 1	Coolmine
Navan Road Parkway	{{{route2}}}	Coolmine
	Future	
Navan Road Parkway	DART; Line 1	Coolmine
