= Coolmine railway station =

Railway station in County Dublin, Ireland

Coolmine Cúil Mhín
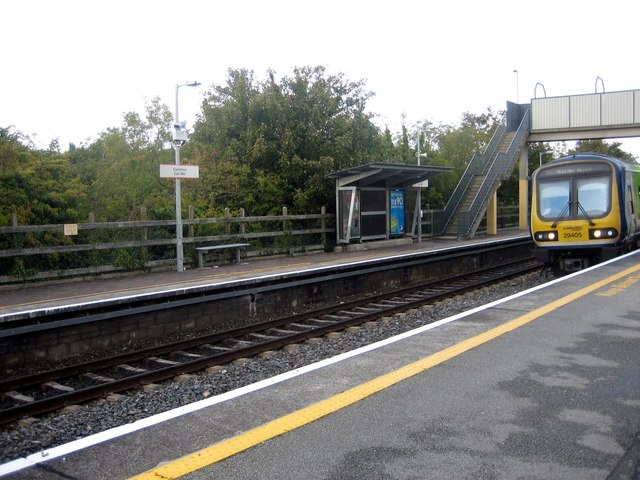
- A 29000 Class DMU stands at Coolmine on a service to Maynooth

General information
- Location: Carpenterstown Road, Dublin 15, D15 AP63; Ireland
- Coordinates: 53.3775°N 6.3914°W
- Owner: Iarnród Éireann
- Operator: Iarnród Éireann
- Platforms: 2

Construction
- Structure type: At-grade

Other information
- Station code: CMINE
- Fare zone: Suburban 2

History
- Opened: 2 July 1990

Key dates
- 2000: Station upgraded
Location

Coolmine railway station serves Coolmine, County Dublin, Ireland.

It lies on the Dublin to Maynooth and Dublin Docklands to M3 Parkway railway station commuter routes.

A large car park is located next to the station, making it a popular park and ride location.

== History ==
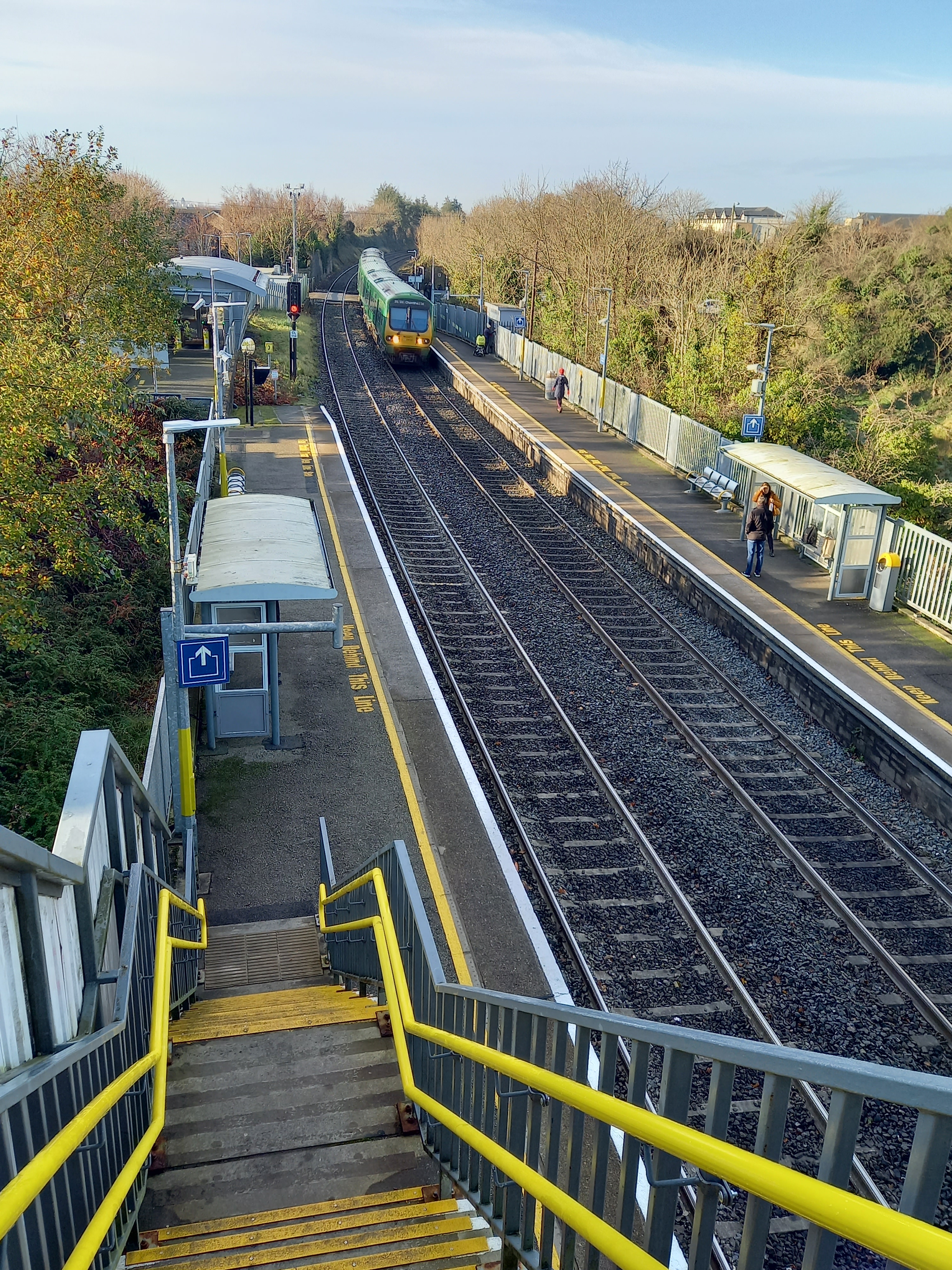
Coolmine train station. Pedestrian bridge. Train from Maynooth. Level Crossing.

The station was inaugurated on 2 July 1990, along with Broombridge, Castleknock, and Leixlip Confey. Like the latter three of these stations, it underwent an upgrade project in 2000 which led to the portacabin booking office being replaced by a permanent station building and the platforms being lengthened..

== Gallery ==

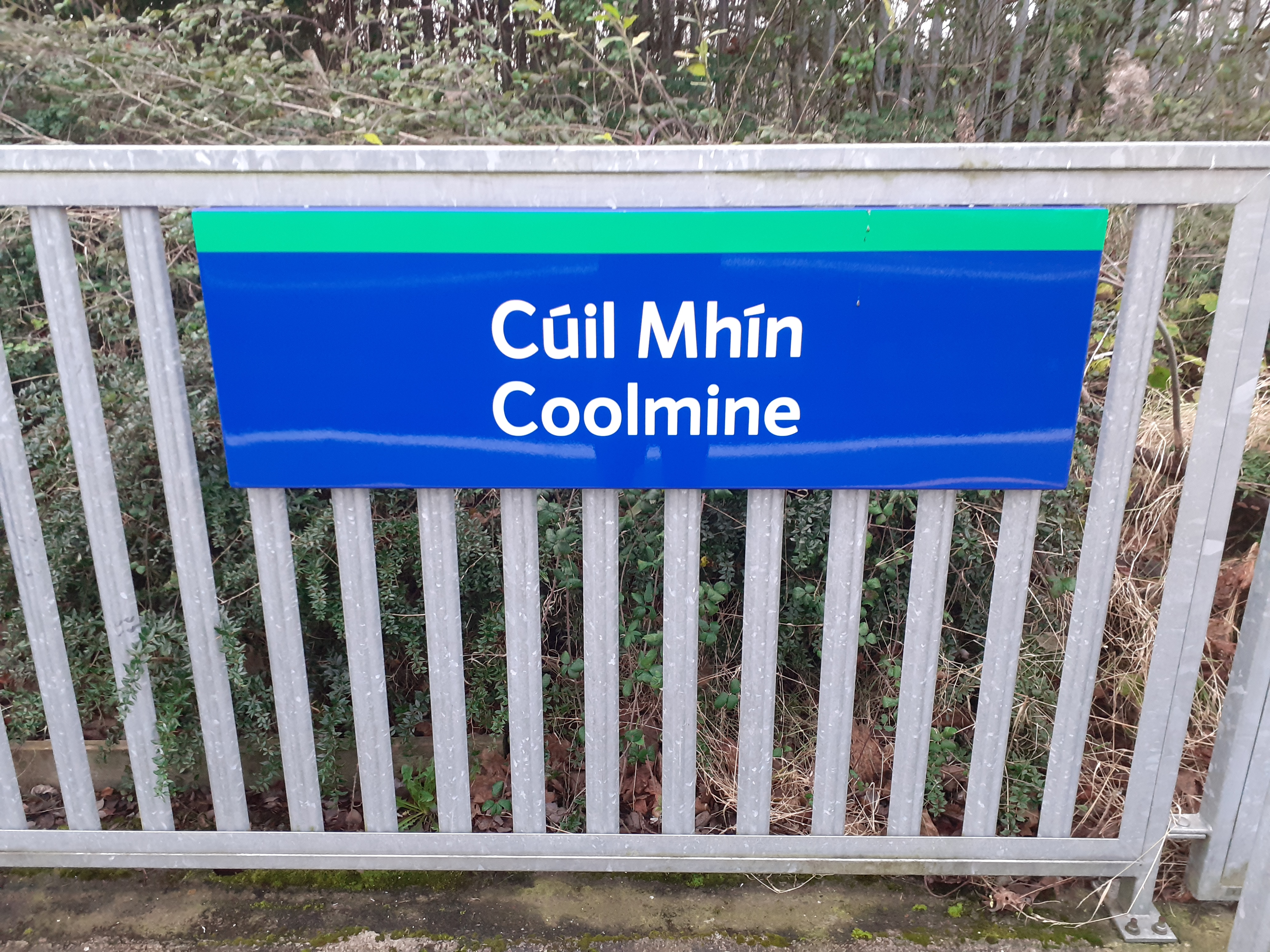

== See also ==
- List of railway stations in Ireland
- Rail transport in Ireland

Preceding station	Iarnród Éireann	Following station
Castleknock	Commuter; Western Commuter	Clonsilla
