= Clonsilla railway station =

Station in suburbs of Dublin, Ireland

Clonsilla Cluain Saileach
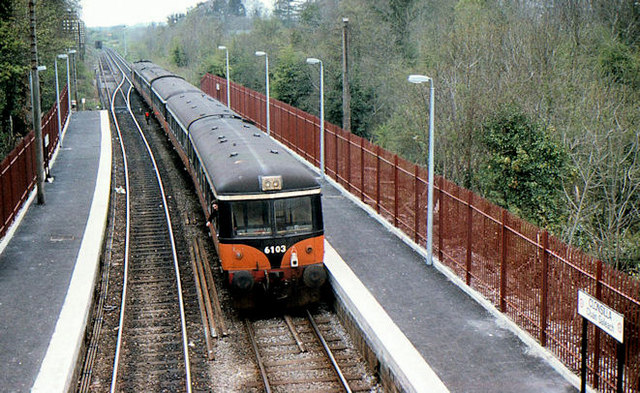
- A train of former CIÉ 2600 Class railcars at Clonsilla in 1982

General information
- Location: Clonsilla Road, Dublin, D15 YA36; Ireland
- Coordinates: 53.383°N 6.423°W
- Owner: Iarnród Éireann
- Operator: Iarnród Éireann
- Platforms: 3
- Tracks: 2
- Bus operators: Dublin Bus; Go-Ahead Ireland
- Connections: 39; L52

Construction
- Structure type: At-grade

Other information
- Station code: CLSLA
- Fare zone: Suburban 2

History
- Opened: 1 September 1848

Key dates
- 17 June 1963: Station closes for freight services
- 2000: Station refurbished
- 2012: Station upgraded
Location

Clonsilla railway station is a railway station that serves Clonsilla, in Fingal, Ireland.

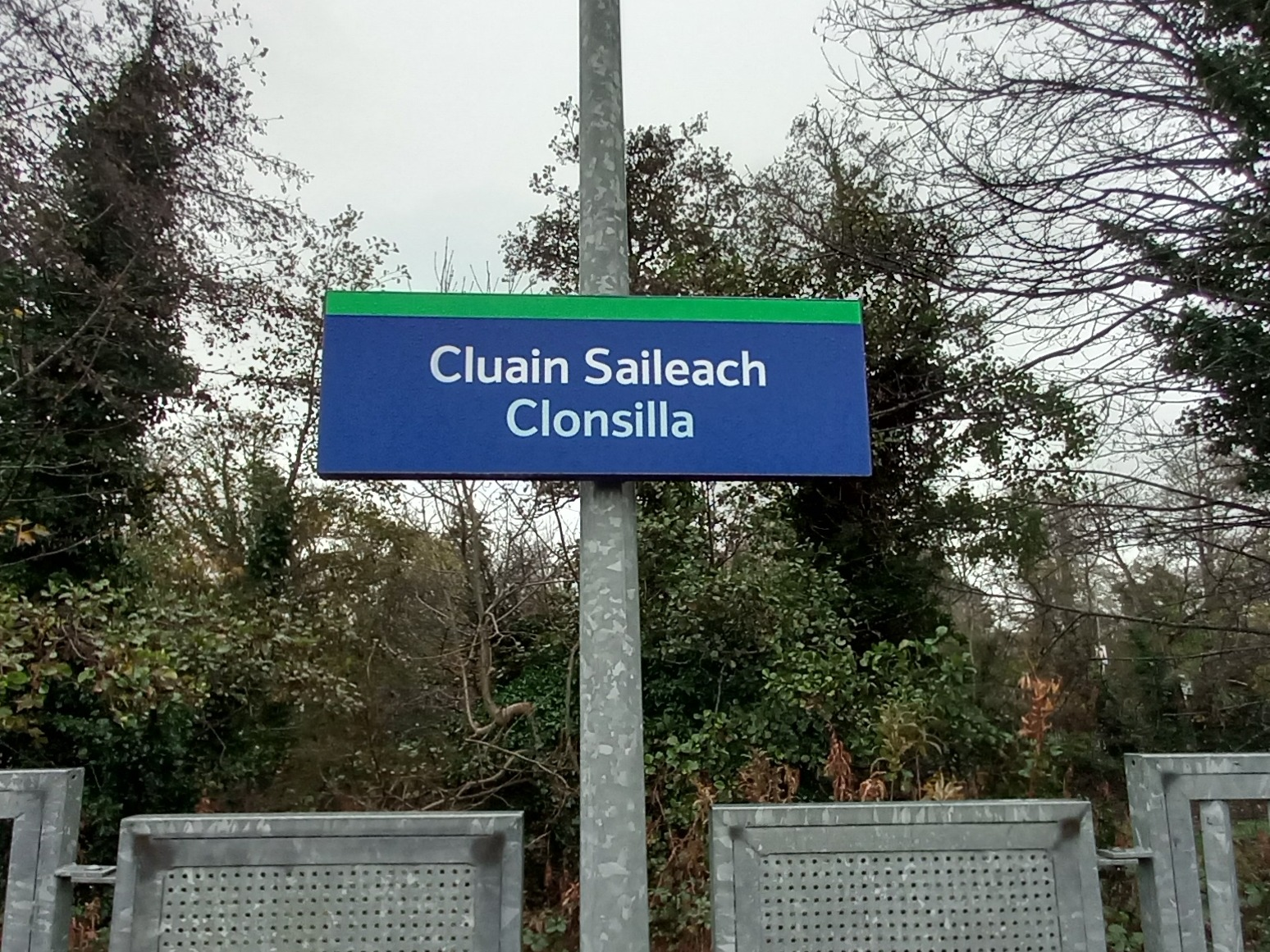

== Description ==
The station underwent an upgrade in 2000 that saw the platforms lengthened and a new station building being constructed.

The ticket office is open from 06:00 AM to 14:00 PM, Monday to Friday. It is closed on Saturday and Sunday.

In 2012, the station was further upgraded with a new footbridge and escalator, refurbished station building, new platform surfaces and construction of platform 3. Platform 3 is used for a shuttle train service between Clonsilla and M3 Parkway.

The level crossing here is still a gated crossing, operated from a wheel in the signal cabin.

== History ==
The station opened on 1 September 1848 and was closed for goods traffic on 17 June 1963. The footbridge at Clonsilla was originally located at the former railway station in Listowel, County Kerry. Between here and Leixlip Confey is what is left of the old Lucan North station (also known as Coldblow) which closed on 8 October 1941. All that remains of the station is a small red brick building on the bank between the tracks and the canal. This building was a waiting room. The station was opposite this but has become a private residence and has been extended and renovated.

The station is one of the original four Western Commuter stations which became part of the line on its inception in November 1981, the others being Ashtown (opened January 1982), Leixlip Louisa Bridge and Maynooth.

On 2 September 2010, the original Dunboyne branch line reopened as the M3 Parkway commuter branch line. The junction is just to the west of Clonsilla station.

== Services ==
Clonsilla station lies on the Dublin Connolly to Maynooth and the Dublin Docklands to M3 Parkway (peak times only Monday to Friday) commuter routes.

All nonpeak time services to Hansfield, Dunboyne, and M3 Parkway are via shuttle train service from Clonsilla at platform 3 only. Travel to Dublin City at nonpeak times for a Hansfield, Dunboyne or M3 Parkway customer means to transfer to a Maynooth to Dublin Connolly service.

InterCity trains from Dublin Connolly to Sligo do not stop at Clonsilla.

Dublin Bus 39 and L52 services stop outside the station providing connections with the Blanchardstown area and Lucan.

== See also ==
- List of railway stations in Ireland
- Rail transport in Ireland

Preceding station	Iarnród Éireann	Following station
Coolmine	Commuter; Western Commuter	Leixlip Confey
Coolmine (Peak times only); Terminus (Off peak)	Commuter; Western Commuter; Via (M3 Parkway Branch)	Hansfield
	Proposed	
Porterstown	DART; Line 1	Leixlip Confey
Porterstown	DART; Navan Branch	Hansfield
	Disused railways	
Ashtown	Midland Great Western Railway; Dublin-Galway/Sligo	Lucan North; Line open, station closed
