= Huntstown and Littlepace =

Outer suburb of Dublin, Ireland

Huntstown and Littlepace Baile Huntaigh agus Luas Beag
- Townlands
- Location in Ireland
- Coordinates: 53.4055°N 6.4203°W
- Country: Ireland
- Province: Leinster
- County: Fingal
- Irish grid reference: O050406

Huntstown and Littlepace (Irish: Baile an Huntaigh agus An Bealach Beag) is a set of modern housing developments that forms an outer suburb of Dublin city in the county of Fingal in Ireland. The developments were built in the townlands of Littlepace (westerly) and Huntstown (easterly) which are the southernmost townlands of the civil parish of Mulhuddart. The district is also a parish in the Blanchardstown deanery of the Roman Catholic Archdiocese of Dublin. The nearest villages in the county are Ongar, Mulhuddart and Clonsilla along with Clonee in County Meath.

== Location and access ==
Located to the south of the River Tolka, the N3 national route sits on the northern boundary of the townlands of Huntstown and Littlepace. To the east, Huntstown borders the community of Blakestown and Blanchardstown and, to the west, Littlepace is bordered by County Meath. Ongar lies to the south of both townlands.

The area is approximately 14 km from Dublin city and 6 kilometers north-west of the M50 motorway. Dublin Bus route 70 connects it to the city centre and Dunboyne. Route 39A connects it to Baggot Street and University College Dublin (UCD). Route 270 goes to the Blanchardstown Shopping Centre. The two nearest railway stations are Clonsilla railway station and Hansfield railway station.

== History ==
The area was developed during the housing boom in Ireland. It is located near a major Kepak Meats plant, Facebook Data Centre and Damastown Industrial Estate. Littlepace stud farm is also nearby. Before the area was developed for housing, it was known as a hunting ground, with some estates and a park named to reflect this. The Huntstown/Littlepace parish was founded in 1981, and formed from the Blakestown parish, which formed from the parish of Corduff in 1979.

On 1 January 2005, a "mini tornado" caused damage to a number of houses and parked vehicles in the area.

== Amenities ==
There are two churches of the Roman Catholic Church in the suburb, which constitutes its own parish:

- Huntstown - "Church of the Sacred Heart of Jesus" (parish separated from Blakestown in 1981)
- Littlepace - "Mary, Mother of Hope" (a Chapel of Ease in the process of development since 2002)

There are also two community centres in the area, one at Huntstown and another in Littlepace.

There are three parks in the area, Littlepace Park, Hunters Run Park and Hazelbury Park. These parks are used by a number of sports clubs.

There is also a small number of shops in the area located beside the Huntstown community centre. There is also a shopping centre, known as Littlepace Shopping Centre, which contains a number of shops, restaurants and a pub.

== Sport ==
The area has two Gaelic Athletic Association (GAA) clubs: Erin go Bragh and Peregrines GAA club. The Erin go Bragh club moved to the area in 2003 and fields teams in Gaelic football, hurling, Ladies football and camogie.

There is also an association football (soccer) club called Clonee United. This club was formed through the amalgamation of two existing clubs, Casta Celtic and Little Pacers FC, in June 2006. Casta Celtic had originally formed in 2002 with Little Pacers establishing themselves in 2000. Santos Soccer Club is also located in the area. A basketball club, the Ongar Chasers, is based in Phibblestown Community Centre.

Huntstown also has a football club known as Huntstown/Hartstown Football Club. Established in 2016, it fields teams for youth and adult players aged from 16–30 years.

== Education ==
Primary schools in the area include the Sacred Heart of Jesus National School in Huntstown, and Mary, Mother of Hope National School in Littlepace.

The nearest two secondary schools are in Hartstown & Phibblestown. Hartstown Community School, located in Hartstown, is home to over 1,300 students. Coláiste Pobail Setanta, in nearby Phibblestown, has over 1000 students. It shares a PE hall, the biggest school sports hall in Ireland, with Phibblestown Community Centre. There are two schools within the Phibblestown school campus, Coláiste Pobail Setanta and Scoil Ghrainne Community National School.
