= Huntstown =

Huntstown may refer to the following places:

- Huntstown, Ohio, ghost town in Putnam County, Ohio
- Huntstown and Littlepace, suburb of Dublin
