= DPP v Peter Cullen =

Irish Supreme Court case

Director of Public Prosecutions v Peter Cullen
- DPP v Peter Cullen
- Court: Supreme Court of Ireland
- Decided: 18 February 2014
- Citation: [2014] IESC 7, [2014] 3 IR 30

Court membership
- Judges sitting: Hardiman J, Fennelly J, Clarke J

Case opinions
- Held that it was unlawful for handcuffs to be place on those being arrested without any consideration to whether they are necessary or not
- Decision by: Fennelly J
- Concurrence: Hardiman J
- Dissent: Clarke J

Keywords
- Criminal law | Drink driving | Unlawful arrest and detention | Unjustified use of handcuffs | Breath specimens | Admissibility of evidence | Road Traffic At 1961

DPP v Peter Cullen, [2014] IESC 7; [2014] 3 IR 30, was an Irish Supreme Court case in which the Court addressed the routine practice of An Garda Síochána of placing handcuffs after an arrest for drink driving. The court ruled that an arrest will be thrown out if it is shown that it was unnecessary to place handcuffs on the accused. There are certain circumstances that must be considered. For instance, whether the accused has a tendency for violence whilst intoxicated. The ruling raised the possibility that an invalidation of the arrest will also have an effect on the admissibility of the evidence.

== Background ==
On 21 September 2007, Peter Cullen was driving through Clonee Village in Dublin around 10:30 pm when Garda Sergeant Moyles noticed Mr.Cullen driving in an erratic fashion. He became suspicious that he was under the influence of alcohol and signalled for him to pull over. He requested that Mr.Cullen provide a breath sample under the Road Traffic Act 1994, as amended, which he did so without any objections. The test indicated that his blood alcohol level was above the legal limit. He was arrested on suspicion of drink driving, placed in handcuffs and brought to Blanchardstown Garda Station. After arriving at the Garda Station he then provided two more breath specimens. These specimens indicated 71 micrograms of alcohol per 100 millilitres of breath.

When cross-examined, Sergeant Moyles admitted that Mr.Cullen had been obliging during the arrest and it was because of personal policy that he had decided to place the accused in handcuffs, rather than belief that it was necessary. This establishes how difficult it is to rely on gut instinct. It may be suggested that Sergeant Moyles was taking the usual precautions whilst arresting someone, in any given circumstance. However, the fact that Mr. Cullen was obliging during the arrest could mean that Mr. Cullen's constitutional rights have been breached which would have made his arrest unlawful.

On appeal in the Circuit Court, the Judge was of the opinion that Sergeant Moyles had acted unlawfully in placing handcuffs on the defendant. His Honour Judge O'Sullivan stated a case for the opinion of the Supreme Court on two issues. He asked:

1. "Since the arresting Garda did not believe that the defendant was likely to resist arrest, was it just and lawful to hold that the handcuffing of the respondent following arrest was unjustified?
2. If the above question was given an affirmative answer, was it correct to conclude that the handcuffing of the defendant was a conscious and deliberate breach of the defendant's constitutional rights which would have rendered his arrest and detention unlawful. Evidence made against the defendant, such as the quantity of alcohol in his system, would be considered admissible."

In the District Court, Sergeant Moyles believed that the arrest was justified because such persons, whilst intoxicated could become abusive and resist arrest.

== Supreme Court Decision ==
The court concluded that the arrest made on the defendant was unjustified. As a result, the Supreme Court also had to consider the admissibility the evidence relating the blood alcohol concentration.

The Court held that it was unlawful to place handcuffs on suspects who were being arrested without giving any consideration to the context and, in particular, to the behavior and demeanor of the individual being arrested. The Court held that the Gardaí must only use such force as is reasonable in the circumstances. This is of paramount importance. It is for the Garda to make such a judgment and the law allows a generous measure of judgment to be exercised as to whether such force is or is not justified.

Fennelly J. relied on the principles established in DPP v Gaffney and DPP v McCreesh. In DPP v Gaffney, the arresting Garda breached Article 40 of the Constitution. The arresting Garda went into the house of the defendant to arrest him. However, this arrest was held unlawful as the arresting Garda was not given the permission to enter the house. There was a deliberate and conscious breach of the defendant's constitutional rights. For the arrest to be lawful, a warrant should have been made. DPP v McCreesh stated that an arrest may not be valid if the defendant was not aware that an arrest is being made. The defendant must be given clarity, such as words that would expressly state that the defendant is being arrested.

Fennelly J., in his judgment, stated that the defendant's arrest was unlawful because the arresting Garda did not give "any consideration to the context and in particular to the behavior and demeanor of the individual being arrested". In this case, the defendant was shown to have not resisted arrest. Furthermore, he was cordial and sensible whilst being detained. Hardiman J. agreed with this judgment. The Supreme Court seemed to be of agreement that the arresting Garda was acting subjectively.

=== Dissent ===
Interestingly, Clarke J. disagreed in part from the judgment. In his dissent, he noted that while the placing of handcuffs on the defendant was unlawful, it affected the manner of his arrest rather than the entitlement to arrest him, and therefore did not affect the lawfulness of his arrest or custody. Clarke J held that "the unlawful handcuffing of the person only rendered the manner of the arrest, not the arrest itself, unlawful". The exclusionary rule means that evidence obtained from the defendant would be unlawful, if it was held that the defendant's constitutional rights were breached. Clarke J. believed that "whether the certificate of alcohol concentration in Mr. Cullen's case was admissible would, therefore, depend on the view which this court takes on the current status and extent of the exclusionary rule."

== Subsequent developments ==
DPP v Peter Cullen has since been referred to as authority for the lawfulness of arrests in subsequent cases.
