= William Mooney =

William Mooney may refer to:

- William Mooney (actor), American actor
- William C. Mooney, U.S. Representative from Ohio
- William Mooney (cricketer), Irish cricketer
- William Mooney (Tammany Hall), Irishman who founded Tammany Hall
