= Clonee =

Village in County Meath, Ireland

Clonee Cluain Aodha
- Village
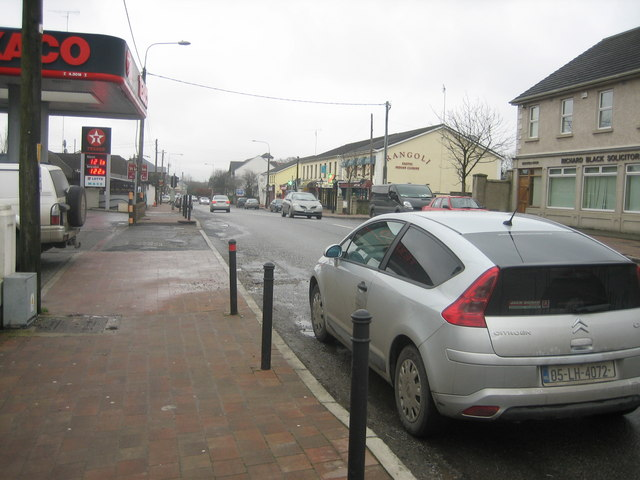
- The R147 road through Clonee

- Location within Dublin Location within Ireland
- Coordinates: 53°24′42″N 6°26′39″W
- Country: Ireland
- Province: Leinster
- County: County Meath
- Elevation: 65 m (213 ft)

Population (2022)
  - Urban: 1,205
- Time zone: UTC+0 (WET)
  - Summer (DST): UTC-1 (IST (WEST))
- Eircode routing key: D15
- Irish Grid Reference: O032412

Clonee (Irish: Cluain Aodha, meaning 'Aodh's pasture') is a village and a townland in County Meath, Ireland. It borders County Dublin to the east at the townlands of Huntstown and Littlepace, and is sometimes used in addresses for housing in those townlands. The River Tolka passes the village.

== Geography ==
Clonee is situated on fairly level land, with the River Tolka passing, joined by the Clonee Stream at one end of the village.

== Location and access ==
The townland is part of the civil parish of Dunboyne which is just a couple of km away down the R156 road. It is situated just off the main N3 Dublin to Cavan road and is 4 miles north-west of the M50 motorway.

=== Bus ===
Clonee village is about 14 km from Dublin and is accessible by Dublin Bus routes 70 (Baggot St- Dunboyne), 70D (to and from Dublin City University), and 270 (Blanchardstown Shopping Centre-Dunboyne). It is close to the suburb of Ongar which is served by route 39/A (Belfield/Baggot Street).

Bus Éireann routes 109 (to/from Dunshaughlin, Navan, Kells, Virginia and Cavan) and 105 (to/from Ratoath via Fairyhouse Racecourse) also serve Clonee. The stops for this route are outside and opposite Lidl.

=== Rail ===
Clonee is served by Hansfield railway station, approximately 3km away. Trains can be taken to Clonsilla, Coolmine, Castleknock, Ashtown and Dublin Docklands via Dublin city direction and Dunboyne and M3 parkway in opposite direction.

== Demographics ==
Between 2011 and 2022, Clonee village's population almost doubled, from 631 to 1,205.

== Facilities ==
There is one public house, The Grasshopper Inn, and two supermarkets (Aldi and Lidl). Clonee is home to Dunboyne Tennis Club, Clonee United and the Royal Meath Pitch and Putt club. The GAA club, Erin Go Bragh, is located in Littlepace.

'Gateway to Meath' is a public art installation on the N3 Clonee Bypass. It features a 2.7m tall bronze man at a 4m high bronze gate by the artist Ann Meldon Hugh.

== Economy ==
The Kepak Group, a large food processing company with a turnover in excess of €500 million and employing more than 2000 people in Ireland and the UK, moved its headquarters to Clonee in 1981.

A Facebook datacenter was built in the area in 2018, powered by Ireland's first private 220kV substation.

== See also ==
- List of towns and villages in Ireland
