= Ongar, Dublin =

Outer residential suburb of Dublin, Ireland

Ongar (Hansfield)
- Suburb (village core)
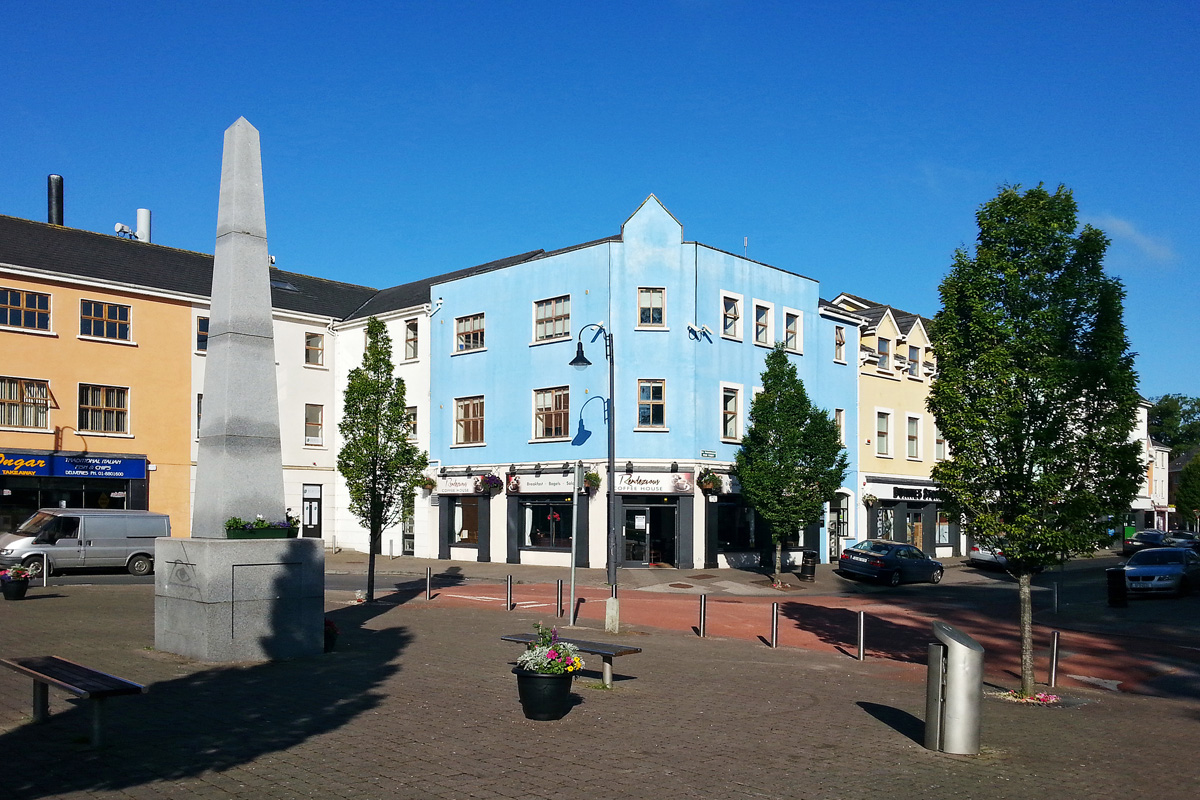
- Ongar Square

- Location in Dublin
- Coordinates: 53°23′45″N 6°26′23″W
- Country: Ireland
- Province: Leinster
- County: County Dublin
- Local government area: Fingal
- Established: 2001

Government
  - Dáil constituency: Dublin West
  - EP constituency: Dublin
- Elevation: 62 m (203 ft)
- Time zone: UTC+0 (WET)
  - Summer (DST): UTC-1 (IST (WEST))
- Eircode routing key: D15
- Irish grid reference: O038395

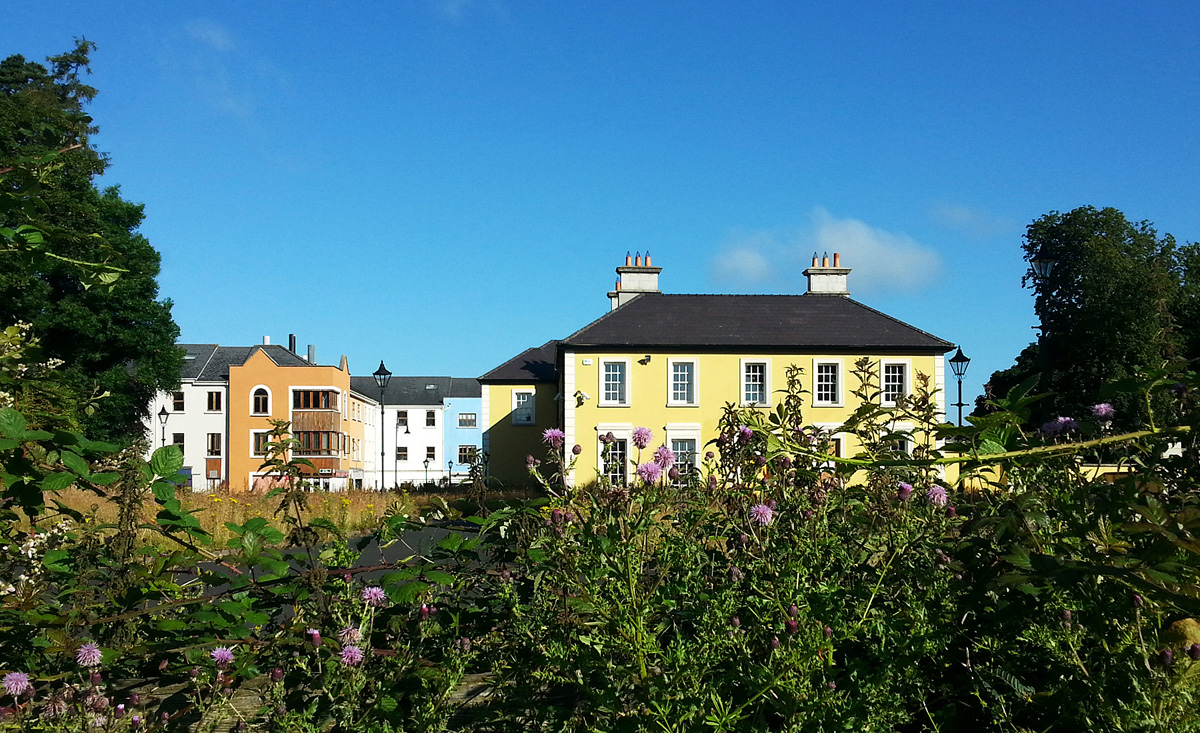
Ongar House

Ongar /ˈɒŋɡər/ is a suburban village of Dublin, Ireland which has been developed on a greenfield basis since 2001. It lies within parts of the townlands of Castaheany (northerly) and "Hansfield or Phibblestown" (southerly), within the historical Barony of Castleknock, County Dublin. It is close to Blanchardstown, Clonsilla, Clonee and the N3 road. There are a number of amenities on Ongar's main street and several schools in the area. The nearby Hansfield railway station is served by Dublin Suburban Rail services. It is in the Fingal local government area.

== History ==
=== Medieval period ===
The lands now occupied by Ongar, including the townland of Hansfield (Phibblestown), fall within the historical Barony of Castleknock. Following the Anglo-Norman invasion, Hugh de Lacy created the barony in 1177 and granted it to Hugh Tyrrel of Castleknock Castle.

=== Origins and the Ongar Stud ===
The modern district of Ongar is situated within the townlands of Hansfield (Phibblestown) and Castaheany, west of Blanchardstown and near Clonee, close to the boundary between County Dublin and County Meath. For much of the 20th century, a significant part of the area was occupied by the Ongar Stud, an equestrian facility named for Ongar, Essex. In the 1950s, the stud gained prominence when it was purchased by Prince Aly Khan and became a residence for his wife, Hollywood actress Rita Hayworth. Several of the modern residential developments in the area were given the names of famous racehorses.

=== 21st-century development and New Urbanism ===
In 2001, the land underwent a major transition from agricultural and equestrian use to a master-planned residential community. Ongar was designed using "New Urbanism" principles, which prioritise high-density living centered on a walkable "Main Street." In the case of Ongar, this design was intended to replicate the functional density of a traditional Irish village, contrasting with the lower-density suburban sprawl typical of earlier Dublin 15 developments, and Main Street was completed already c. 2004.

Pre-existing structures in the area, including the Victorian-era Phibblestown House, were preserved and integrated into the modern landscape. The house, which was built c. 1850, is included in the Record of Protected Structures maintained by Fingal County Council.

Ongar House, now an apartment complex, is a facsimile of the original house, which was destroyed in a fire on the night of 14/15 September 2002. The building, which was rebuilt to the same "form and appearance of the original Ongar House", was sold in 2013.

== Location and access ==
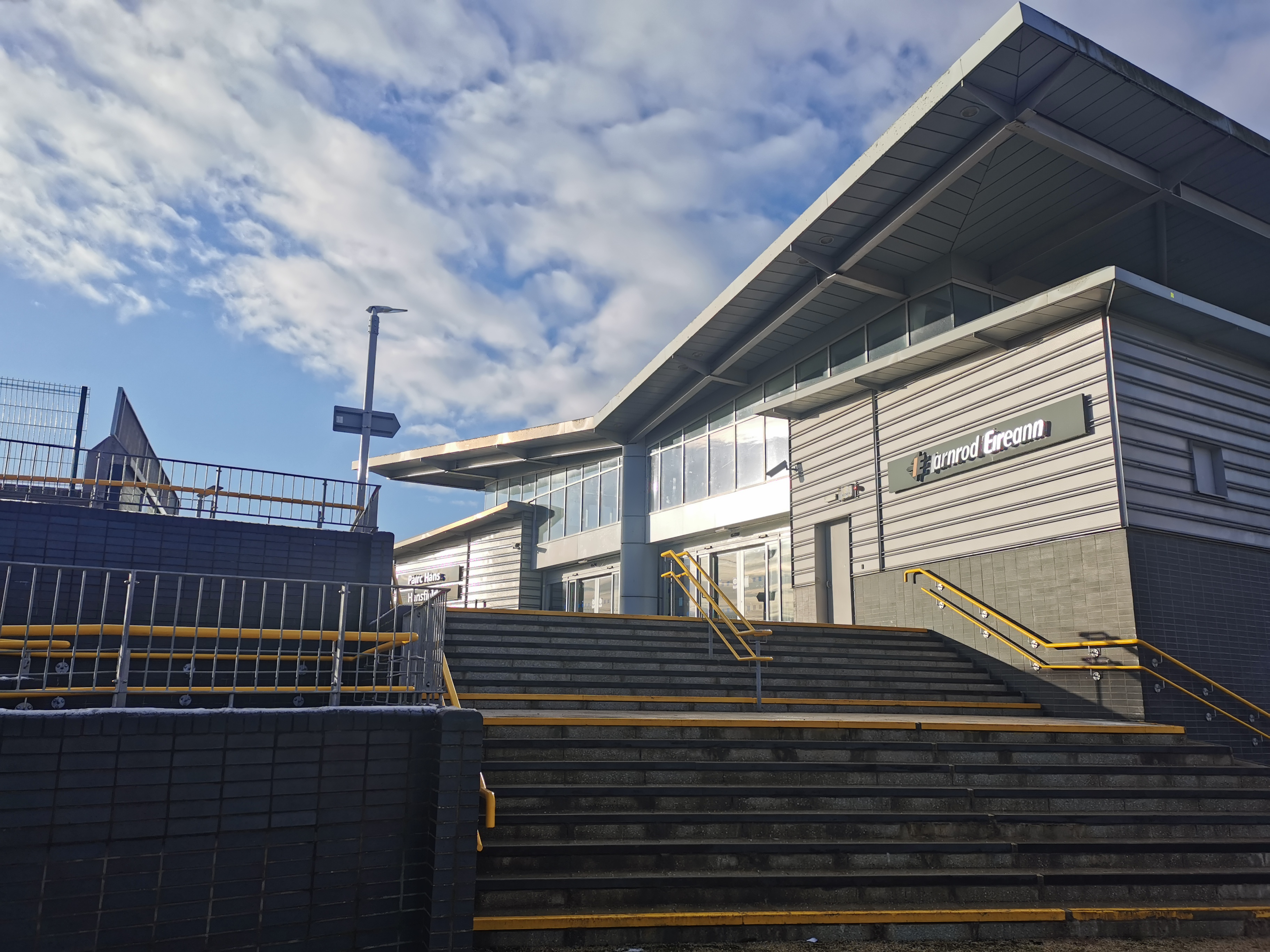
The Ongar area is served by Hansfield railway station

Ongar is approximately 16 kilometres (10 mi) north-west of Dublin city centre. It is centred on the townland of "Hansfield or Phibblestown" and is contained within the old civil parish of Clonsilla. The village of Clonee is 2 kilometres to the north, while Clonsilla is roughly 2 km to the east, and Blanchardstown Shopping Centre, and the actual village of Blanchardstown are approximately 3−3.5 km away. Ongar is in the Dublin 15 postal district.

The Royal Canal passes to the south, and small streams run in the area.

=== Road ===
To the north is the Littlepace interchange of the N3 national route, which just after becomes the M3 motorway. Pedestrian access to Castaheany is possible to the north where the tree-lined avenue, house and walled garden of Phibblestown House have been preserved.

In February 2026, the €23 million Ongar-Barnhill Road was officially opened. The 2km project connects the Barnwell Roundabout to the R149 at Barberstown and includes a new bridge over the Dunboyne railway line. The road features segregated cycle lanes and improved pedestrian infrastructure, which has been cited by Fingal County Council as an 'active travel' corridor connecting Ongar to five nearby schools and the wider Dublin 15 area.

==== Bus ====
Ongar is served by a network of bus routes provided by Dublin Bus, Go-Ahead Ireland, and TFI Local Link, providing 24-hour, radial, and orbital connectivity. These include routes 39a (a 24-hour service), 39/39x, N2 (an orbital route), 139, L51 and L52, and route 39n (Nitelink services at the weekend). Route 139 connects Ongar village to the Blanchardstown campus of Technological University Dublin.

=== Commuter rail ===
Ongar is served by Hansfield railway station, which opened in June 2013 and is a 10/15 minute walk from the area. The station is on the Dublin Docklands to Dunboyne railway station / M3 Parkway railway station commuter route and its position on the Dunboyne commuter line sees it served by 45 trains daily. Connection to the Luas is possible via Broombridge station.

Under the DART+ West programme, the line serving Hansfield station is scheduled for full electrification. Following the granting of the Railway Order in 2024 and the commencement of procurement in 2025, enabling works began in 2026 with main construction scheduled for 2027. If completed as planned, this is intended to increase train frequency and transition the current diesel commuter service to a high-capacity electric DART service.

== Amenities ==
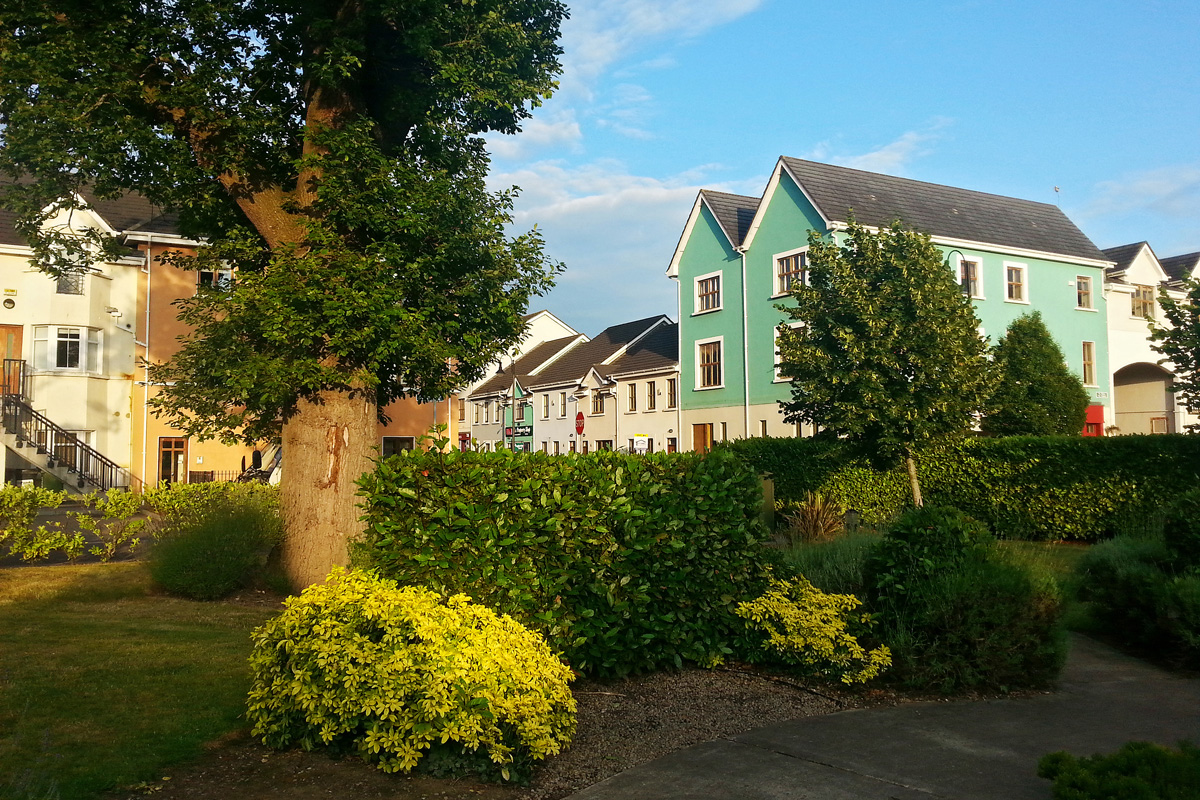
Manor Square looking towards Ongar Main Street

Ongar's masterplan used a mixed-use "Main Street" model, with commercial development at ground level with residential apartments above. The "village core" is anchored by a Dunnes Stores supermarket and features a pedestrianised plaza, Ongar Square, medical centres, pharmacies, and several dining and retail outlets. The Royal Canal Greenway, which passes through the area, provides a dedicated off-road cycling and walking route toward the city centre and Maynooth.

=== Sport ===
The area is served by two Gaelic Athletic Association clubs, Erin go Bragh GAA, which moved to nearby Littlepace in 2003, and Westmanstown Gaels at the Garda Síochána sports grounds in Westmanstown, near Clonsilla. A local soccer club, Clonee United, also based in Littlepace, was formed in 2003 through the amalgamation of two clubs, Casta Celtic, formed in 2002, and Little Pacers F.C., established in 2000, while Santos Soccer Club plays beside the Phibblestown Community Centre. The Ongar Chasers basketball club was formed in 2012.

Ongar is 5km from the National Sports Campus, which includes the National Aquatic Centre (NAC).

=== Education ===
Schools within Ongar include St. Benedicts NS and Castaheany Educate Together. To the north, in Phibblestown, is a campus which houses Scoil Ghráinne National School (opened in 2008 as Ireland's first community primary school) and Phibblestown Community College (a secondary school also known as Colaiste Pobail Setanta). To the south, adjacent to Hansfield railway station, is the Hansfield Educate Together campus, which holds both primary (Hansfield ETNS) and secondary (Hansfield ETSS) education. Ériu Community College opened in the area in 2020.

== Governance and community ==
The local authority is Fingal County Council. Community organisations which operate locally include the Ongar Tidy Towns Committee. This group first participated in the National Tidy Towns competition in 2013. Ongar Tidy Towns, which won Fingal County Council's "Cleaner Communities Award" in 2015, was awarded a grant for anti-litter and anti-graffiti initiatives in 2025.

== Gallery ==
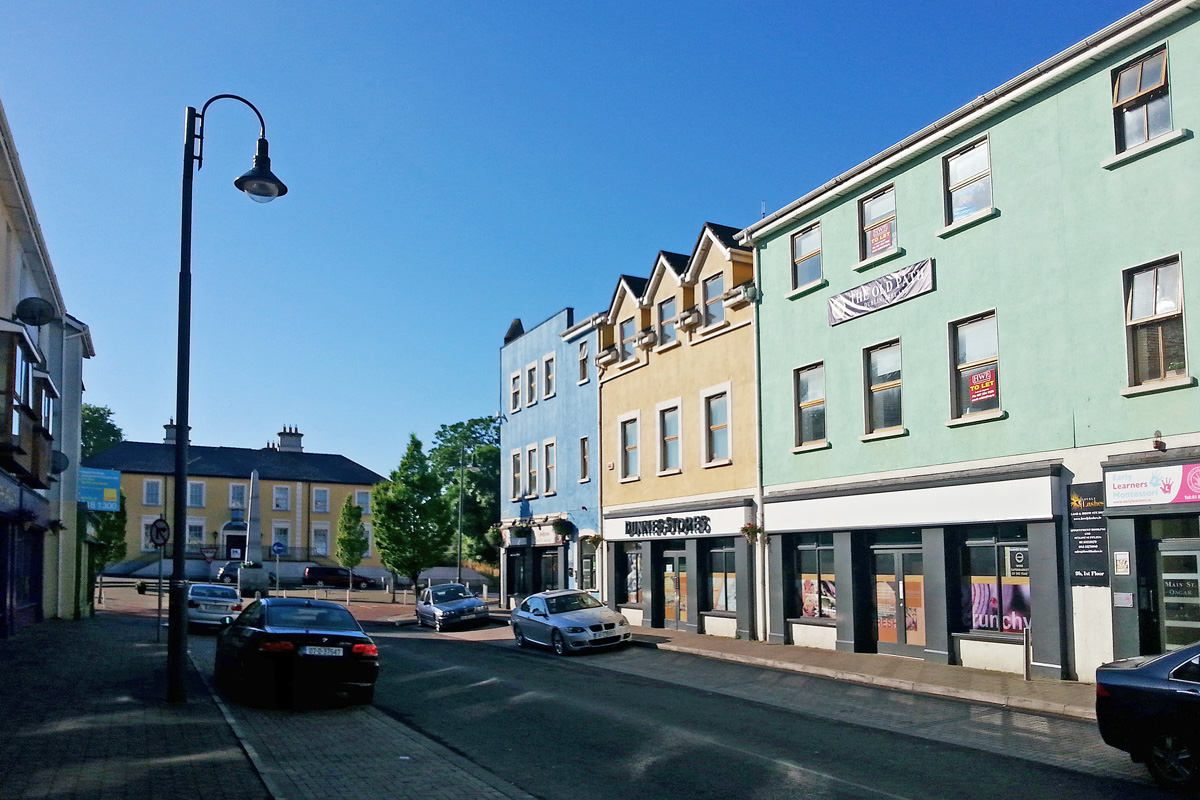
Main Street

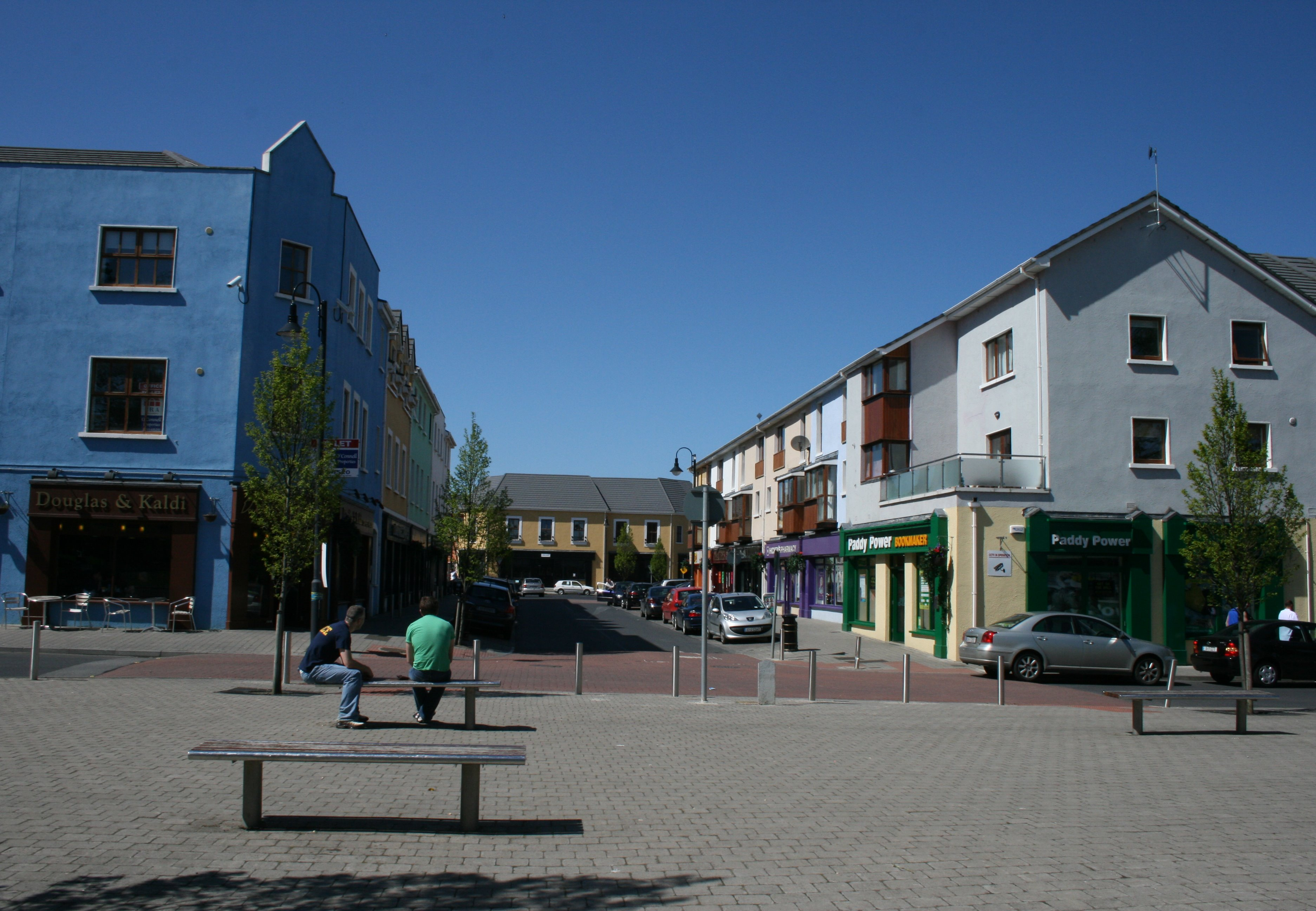
Ongar Square

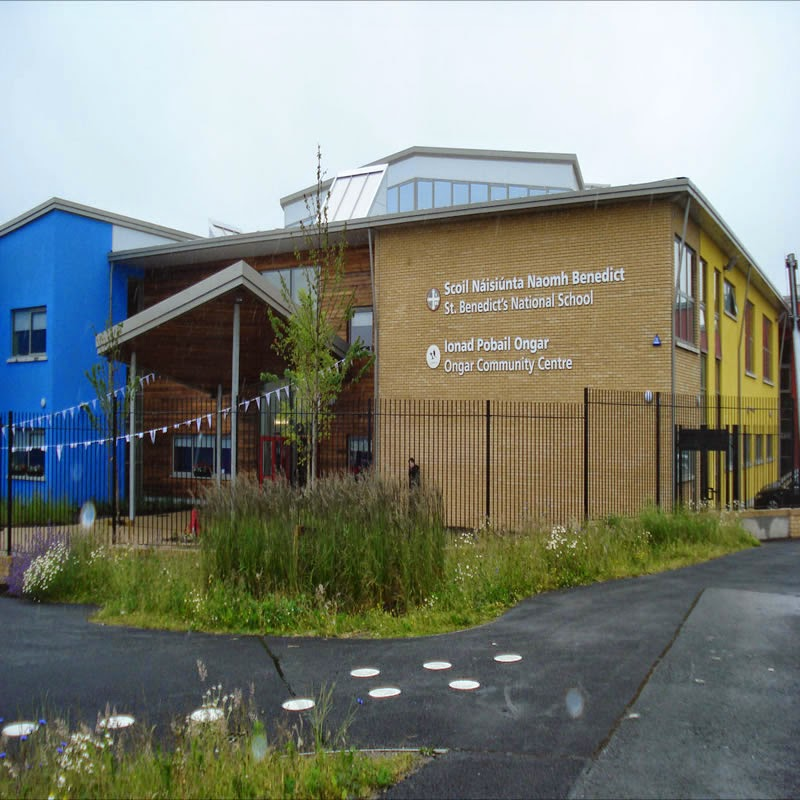
St. Benedict's National School and Ongar Community Centre

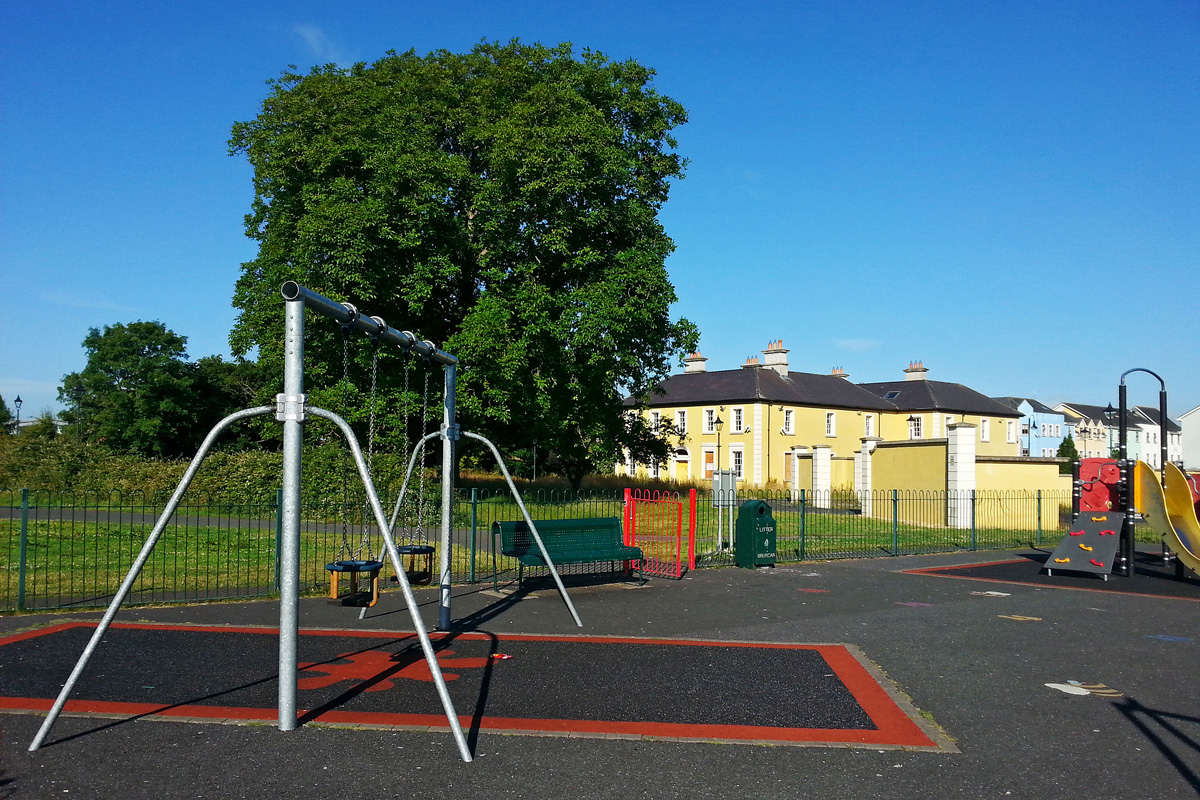
Playground in Ongar

== See also ==
- List of towns and villages in Ireland
