= Blanchardstown =

Large western suburb of Dublin, Ireland

Blanchardstown Baile Bhlainséir (Irish)
- Suburb (village core)
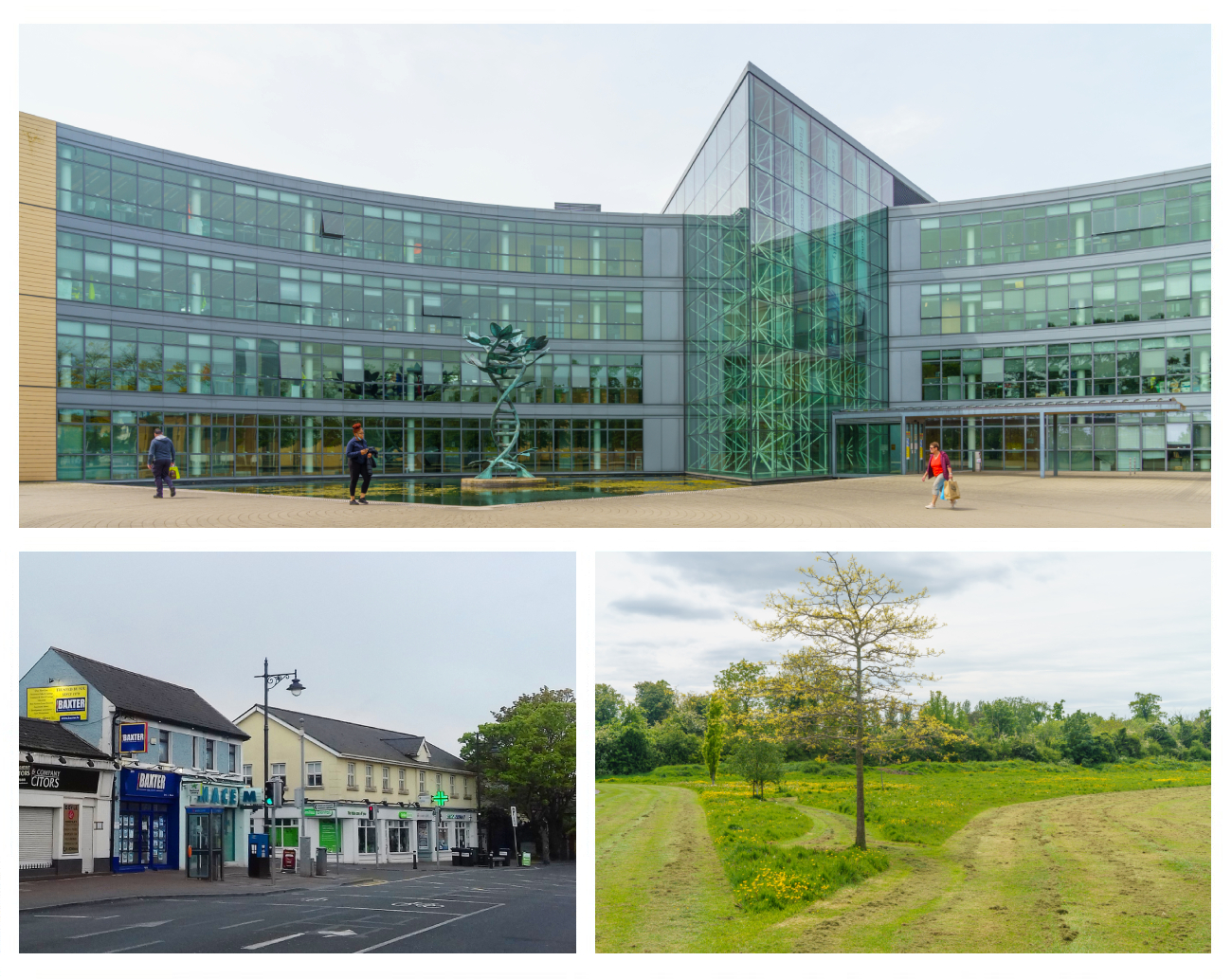
- Clockwise from top: Fingal County Council's Civic Offices; Millennium Park; businesses in Blanchardstown during the COVID-19 pandemic

- Location in Dublin Blanchardstown (Ireland)
- Coordinates: 53.387°N 6.380°W
- Country: Ireland
- Province: Leinster
- Traditional county: County Dublin
- County: Fingal

Government
  - Dáil Éireann: Dublin West
- Elevation: 56 m (184 ft)
- Time zone: UTC±0 (WET)
  - Summer (DST): UTC+1 (IST)
- Eircode routing key: D15
- Telephone area code: +353(0)1
- Irish Grid Reference: O055383

Blanchardstown (Irish: Baile Bhlainséir) is a large outer suburb of Dublin, Ireland. Located ten kilometres (6 mi) northwest of Dublin city centre. Blanchardstown is located in the modern county of Fingal, bordering the Dublin City Council administrative area to its southeast near Ashtown. It has developed since the 1960s from a small village to a point where Greater Blanchardstown is the largest urban area in Fingal.

It is within the historical barony of Castleknock in the traditional County Dublin, as well as the Dublin 15 postal area and the Dublin West electoral constituency.

One of Ireland's largest shopping and leisure complexes — the Blanchardstown Centre and adjacent facilities — is located in the area.

== Etymology ==
The name Blanchardstown comes from the Blanchard family, who were granted their estate sometime between 1250 and 1260. The name 'Blanchard' is thought to come from the old French word 'blanch' meaning white, in turn potentially referring to white or fair hair.

== Geography ==
Blanchardstown is just outside Dublin's M50 motorway semi-ring road, slightly to the north of the tolled crossing of the River Liffey. The core of the suburb is the townland of the same name, containing the village and the Roselawn housing area. It is bordered to the east by the suburb of Castleknock, to the west by Coolmine, which includes some areas, including the Blanchardstown Centre and surrounding retail parks, central to the district, and Clonsilla/Ongar, to the north by Tyrellstown and Hollystown, and to the south and south-east by Porterstown and Diswellstown. The stretch of suburban housing from Castleknock Way north to the Old Navan Road and Talbot Court, including Laurel Lodge, has an ambiguous status - all of it is in the townland of Blanchardstown. The townland has an area of over 454 acres and is within the historical Barony of Castleknock.

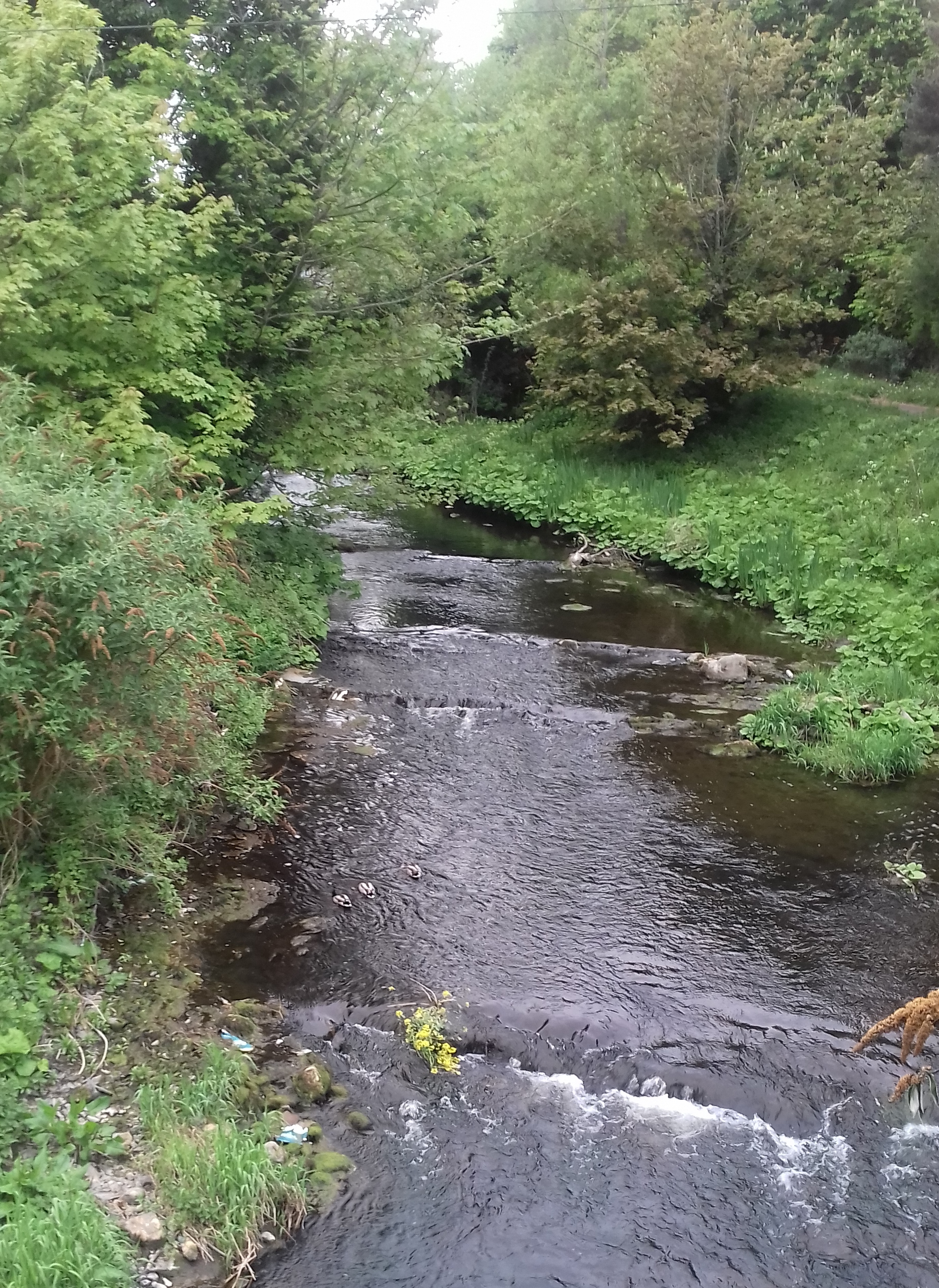
River Tolka by Connolly Memorial Hospital

The River Tolka, the second river of Fingal, and Dublin, runs through the centre of the area, meandering to run just north of the village core, and then further north to pass the Connolly Memorial Hospital and then Abbotstown.

The Royal Canal and the Dublin-Sligo railway line pass along the southern edge of Blanchardstown proper from east to west.

== History ==
Historical population
Year	Pop.	±%
1821	302	—
1831	342	+13.2%
1841	182	−46.8%
1851	273	+50.0%
1861	253	−7.3%
1871	239	−5.5%
1881	239	+0.0%
1891	236	−1.3%
1901	235	−0.4%
1911	315	+34.0%
1926	317	+0.6%
1936	269	−15.1%
1946	419	+55.8%
1951	574	+37.0%
1956	990	+72.5%
1961	1,328	+34.1%
1966	1,782	+34.2%
1971	3,279	+84.0%
1981	21,921	+568.5%
1986	31,637	+44.3%
1991	34,853	+10.2%
1996	37,346	+7.2%
2002	50,193	+34.4%
2006	63,120	+25.8%
2011	68,156	+8.0%
2016	73,150	+7.3%

Blanchardstown was a predominantly rural area, with a small village, in western County Dublin, alongside the neighbouring district of Castleknock. Both areas shared a common history until well into the 19th century, when their development diverged. In A Topographical Dictionary of Ireland, published in 1837, Blanchardstown is described as "a village [..] on the road to Navan, containing 57 houses and 342 inhabitants".

In the late 1960s, the first housing estates began to be developed. During the 1970s and 1980s, the village and surrounding housing developments became subsumed into the suburban fabric of Dublin.

The Institute of Technology, Blanchardstown (ITB) was established in 1999 and, since amalgamation in 2019, is one of the three campuses of the new Technological University Dublin along with Grangegorman and Tallaght campuses.

During the late 1990s a criminal gang from Blanchardstown, known as "The Westies”, controlled the heroin trade in west Dublin. One of its leaders was shot in a pub in Blanchardstown in 2003, while others were killed in Spain in 2004.

== Transport ==
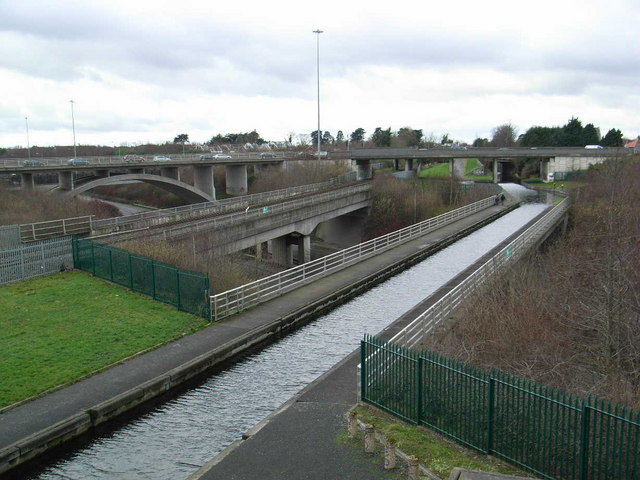
Royal Canal aqueduct

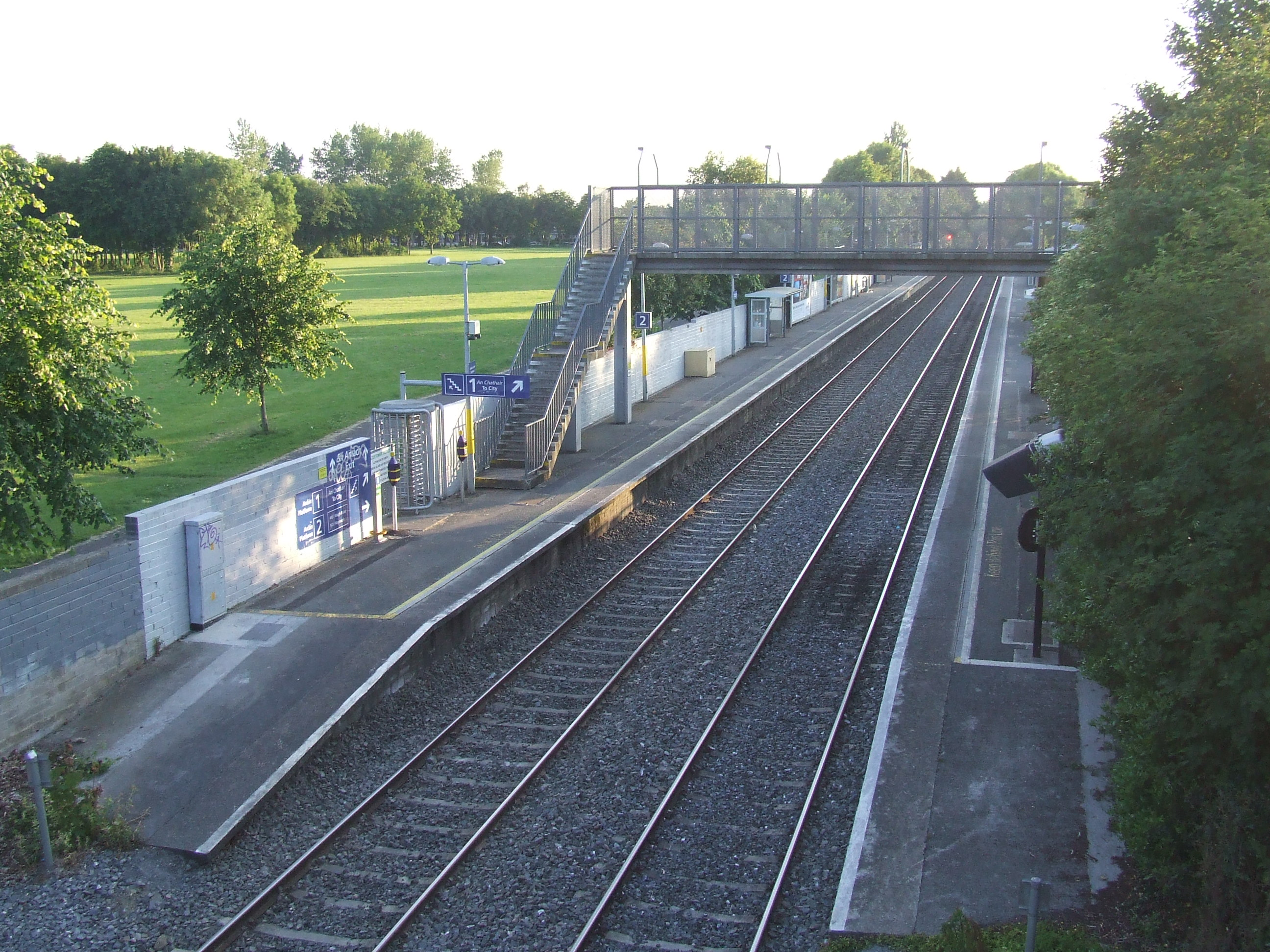
Castleknock railway station

=== Rail ===
There are three Irish Rail railway stations in the wider Blanchardstown area: Castleknock, Coolmine and Clonsilla. Trains on the Maynooth/Longford line connect the city centre, at Dublin Connolly, Tara Street and Dublin Pearse stations, to Maynooth, Longford and Sligo. At Clonsilla station, the Dublin–Navan railway line connects Docklands railway station to Hansfield and Dunboyne.

=== Bus ===
Dublin Bus and Go-Ahead Ireland routes include 37, 38, 38A, 38B, 38D, 39, 39A, 40D, 70, 220, 236, 236A, 238, 270, L52, N4 and W4. Route 39A and N4 operates 24 hours a day 7 days a week.

Nitelink bus route 70N also operates on Friday and Saturday nights to Dunboyne. Express bus routes include service from Aston Quay and from Coolmine Railway Station to Ballycoolin Industrial Estate.

Ballycoolin Industrial Estate is served by a private bus company called AMC Ballycoolin, also known as Express Bus.

Bus Éireann services pass through Blanchardstown on routes 105, 109 and 111.

== Amenities ==
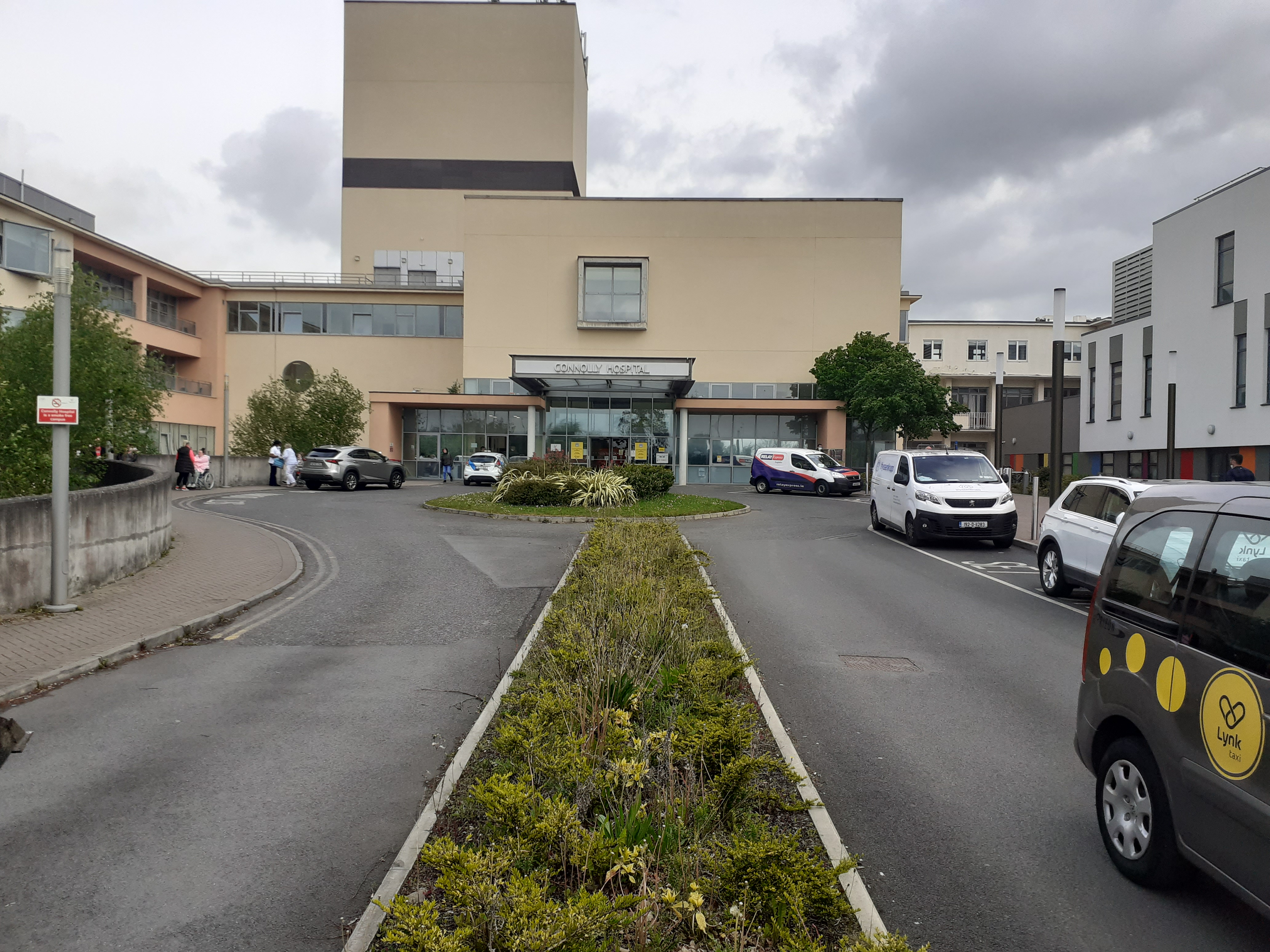
Main entrance to Connolly Hospital

Connolly Hospital, one of Dublin's main hospitals, and a public university teaching hospital, is located in the area, as is the Institute of Technology, Blanchardstown.

Local retail outlets include Blanchardstown Centre (a large retail shopping centre with over 180 stores), and WestEnd Shopping Park (a retail park located beside the Blanchardstown Centre). The Crowne Plaza Hotel, northwest of the village, is located by the Blanchardstown Centre complex. There is a SuperValu outlet on Main Street.

Blanchardstown has a large public library and is also home to the Draíocht Arts Centre.

There is a large Garda station on Blanchardstown's main street.

== Education ==
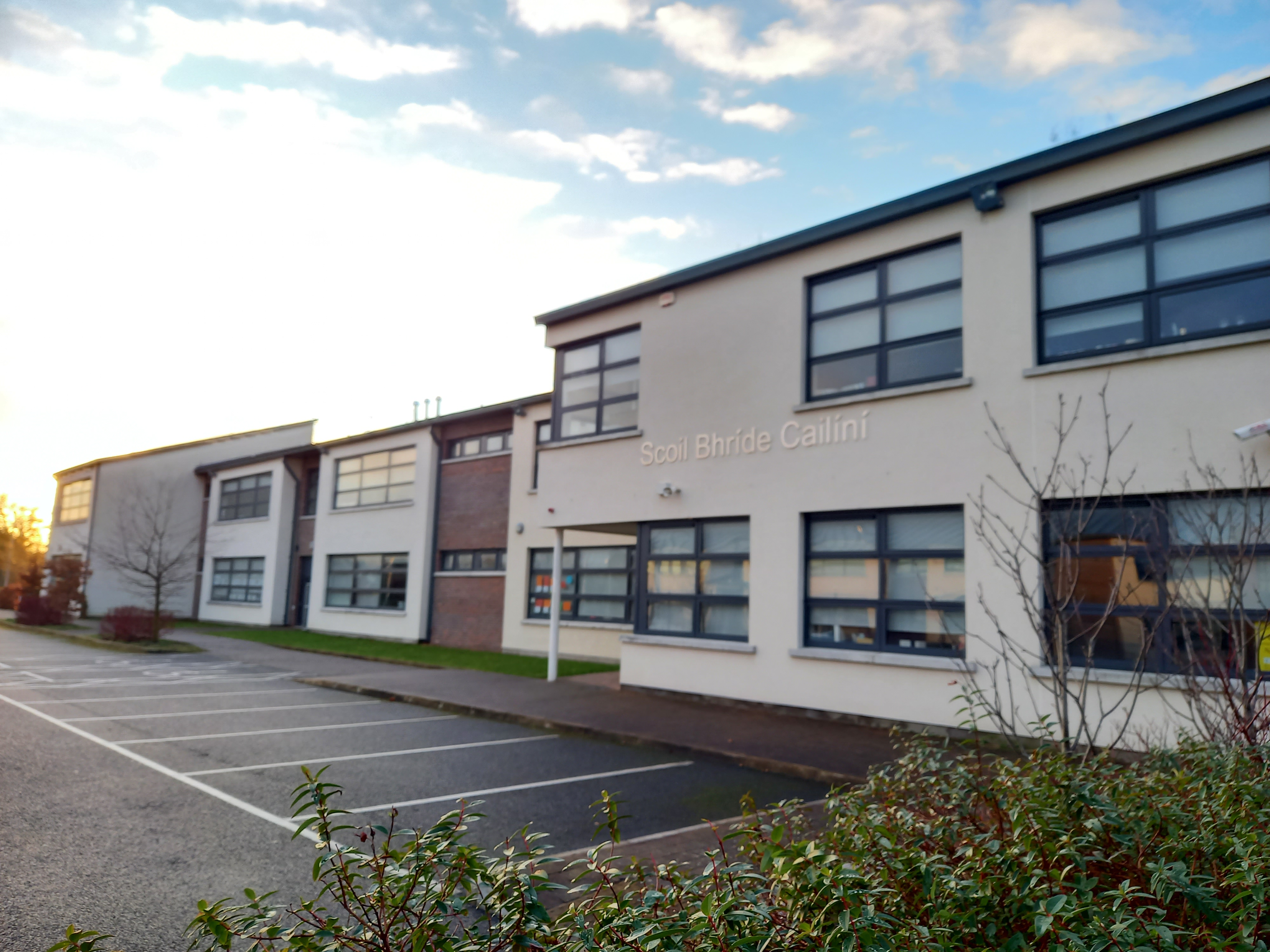
Scoil Bhríde Cailíní

There are a number of primary schools (national schools) in Blanchardstown, including Scoil Bhríde (Cailíní) and Scoil Bhríde (Buachaillí) on Church Avenue, Sacred Heart of Jesus Primary School (Huntstown), Scoile Oilibhéir (Coolmine), St Ciaran's Primary School (Hartstown), Mary Mother of Hope Primary School (Clonee), and St Philip the Apostle Primary School (Mountview).

Second-level schools (secondary schools) serving the area include Blakestown Community School, Rath Dara Community College, Hartstown Community School, and Coolmine Community School.

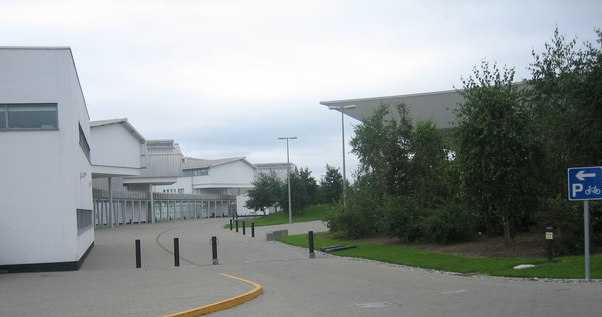
Technological University Dublin- Blanchardstown campus

The Institute of Technology, Blanchardstown (part of TU Dublin) is a third-level institution with a campus on Blanchardstown Road.

== Sport ==
The National Sports Campus is located in Blanchardstown and includes the National Aquatic Centre, a major indoor aquatics facility with a 50m swimming pool, diving pool, leisure pool and aquapark, and fitness centre. The centre hosted the 2003 Special Olympics World Summer Games and a number of international swimming events since then.

There are several GAA clubs in the Blanchardstown area, including St. Brigids, Castleknock and St. Peregrines, Clonsilla. There are also a number of association football (soccer) clubs in the area, including St. Mochta's.

== Religion ==
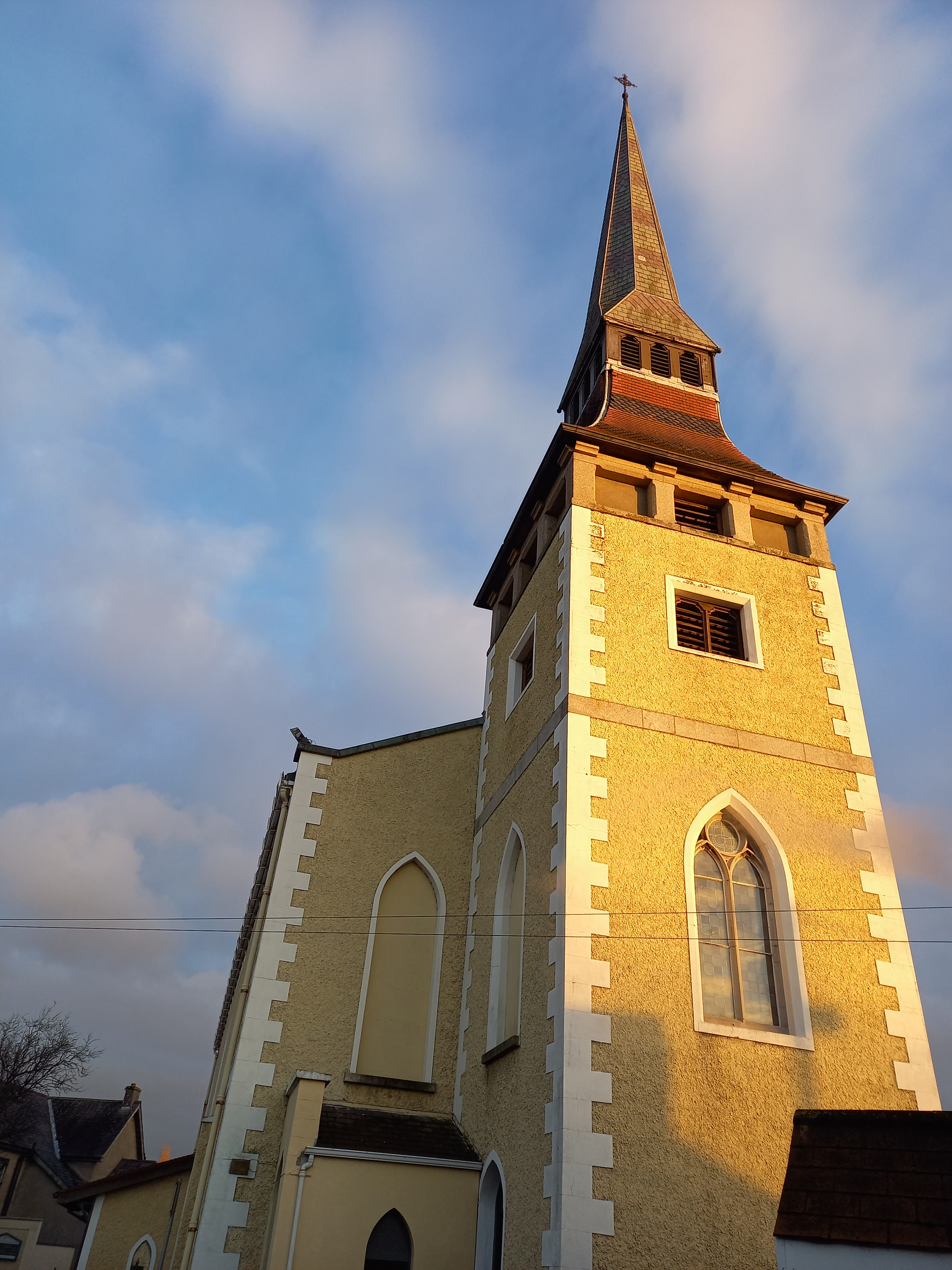
St Brigid's Church, Blanchardstown

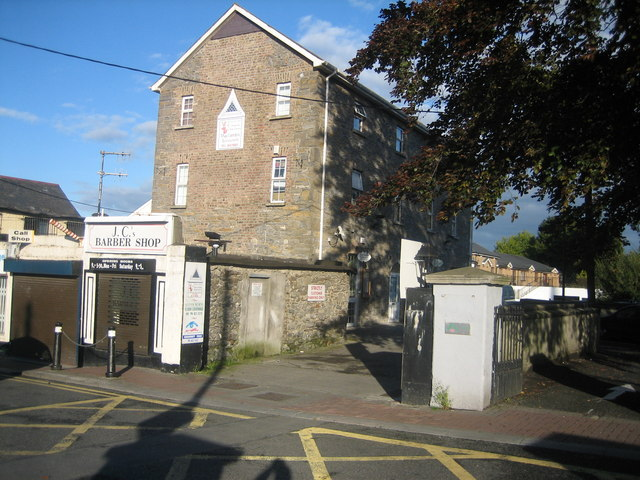
The former Carmelite Convent (now a business premises) in Blanchardstown

St Brigid's Roman Catholic Church is situated behind Main Street at Church Avenue. The foundation stone for the church was laid on 13 October 1835 and the first Mass was celebrated there on 29 October 1837. The construction of the Church and its unusual Flemish spire was finally completed in 1863.

In the 19th century, the Roman Catholic parish of Blanchardstown encompassed much of the area now within the Dublin 15 postal district; some of the component areas were quite distinct from Blanchardstown but Catholic parishes had been merged during Penal Laws times. Following the relaxation of the Penal Laws, it became possible for Catholic adherents to consider the construction of additional churches and to repair the existing stock of religious buildings. Church authorities used the opportunity to implement the Tridentine reform which saw the parish as the basic unit of ecclesiastical organisation and the parish priest as the central figure within the parish.

The new parish priest of Blanchardstown in 1839, Fr Michael Dungan, oversaw the construction of a number of new churches, which today serve independent parishes, and invited a number of religious communities to provide for the education of Catholic children. St Brigid's Church, Blanchardstown – not to be confused with a church of the Church of Ireland in nearby Castleknock – was constructed in 1837 upon the foundation of a church that had been built prior to 1731. It is the mother church of 12 other churches constituted out of the parish over the following 156 years.

- Chapelizod - "Nativity of the Blessed Virgin Mary" (separated from Blanchardstown Parish 1883)
  - Navan Road - "Our Lady Help of Christians" (separated from Chapelizod 1953)
- Castleknock - "Our Lady Mother of the Church" (separated from Blanchardstown 1976)
  - Laurel Lodge / Carpenterstown - "St Thomas, the Apostle" (separated from Castleknock 1983)
- Porterstown - "St Mochta's" (separated from Castleknock 1986. The present church was constructed in 1890 as a Chapel of ease for Blanchardstown.)
- Corduff - "St Patrick's Church" (separated from Blanchardstown 1976)
  - Mountview - "St Philip, the Apostle" (separated from Corduff 1979)
  - Blakestown - "Church of Mary of the Servants" (separated from Corduff 1979)
    - Huntstown - "Church of the Sacred Heart of Jesus" (separated from Blakestown 1981)
      - Littlepace - "Chapel of Ease, Mary, Mother of Hope" (in the process of development since 2002)
- Hartstown - "St Ciarán' Church" (separated Blanchardstown 1979)
- Mulhuddart / Lady's Well - "St Luke, the Evangelist" (separated from Blanchardstown 1993)

== Representation ==
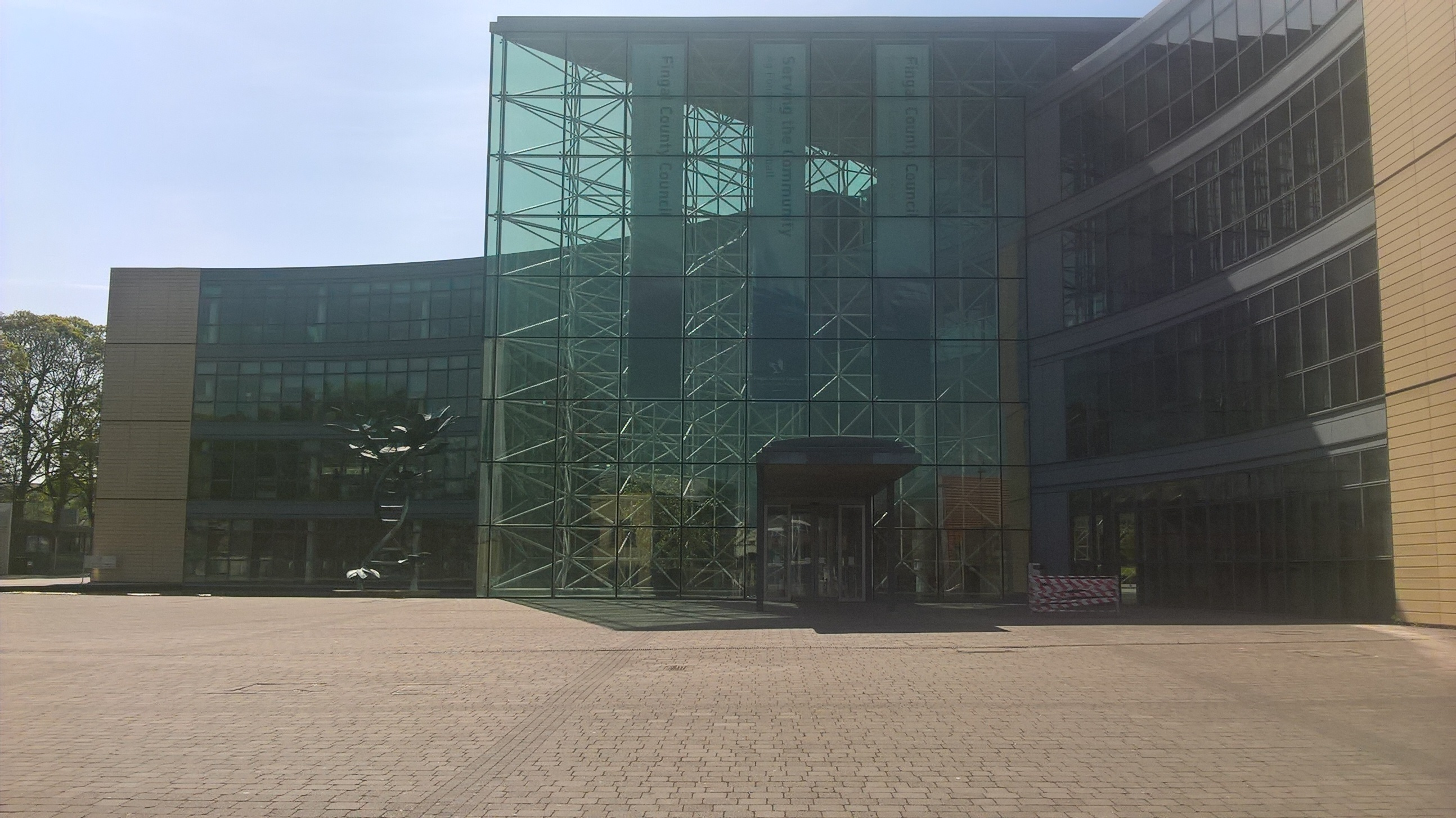
Fingal County Council civic offices, Blanchardstown

For the purposes of elections to Dáil Éireann, Blanchardstown is part of the Dublin West constituency, which returns four TDs.

For elections to Fingal County Council, the suburb is split between the two local electoral areas (LEAs) of Castleknock (which returns 4 councillors), and Mulhuddart (which returns 5 councillors).

== Notable people ==
- Joan Burton, former Labour TD, Tánaiste and government minister
- Jade Jordan, actor and author
- Siva Kaneswaran, musician with The Wanted
- William Mooney, cricketer
- John Troy, Roman Catholic Archbishop of Dublin, was born in Porterstown between Blanchardstown and Clonsilla.
- Leo Varadkar, a Fine Gael TD, former Taoiseach and former Tánaiste, grew up in the Blanchardstown/Castleknock area

== Gallery ==
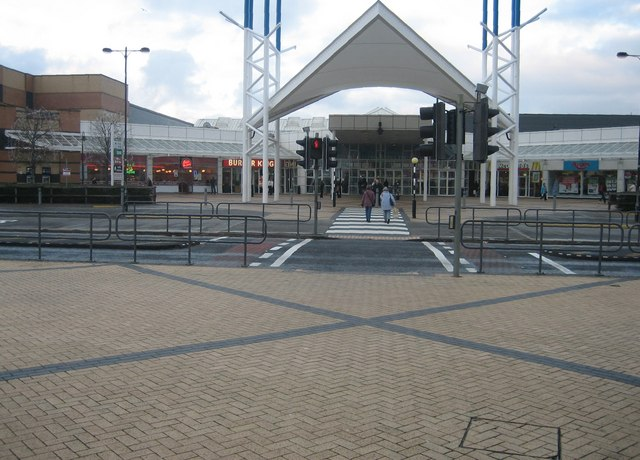
Blanchardstown Centre

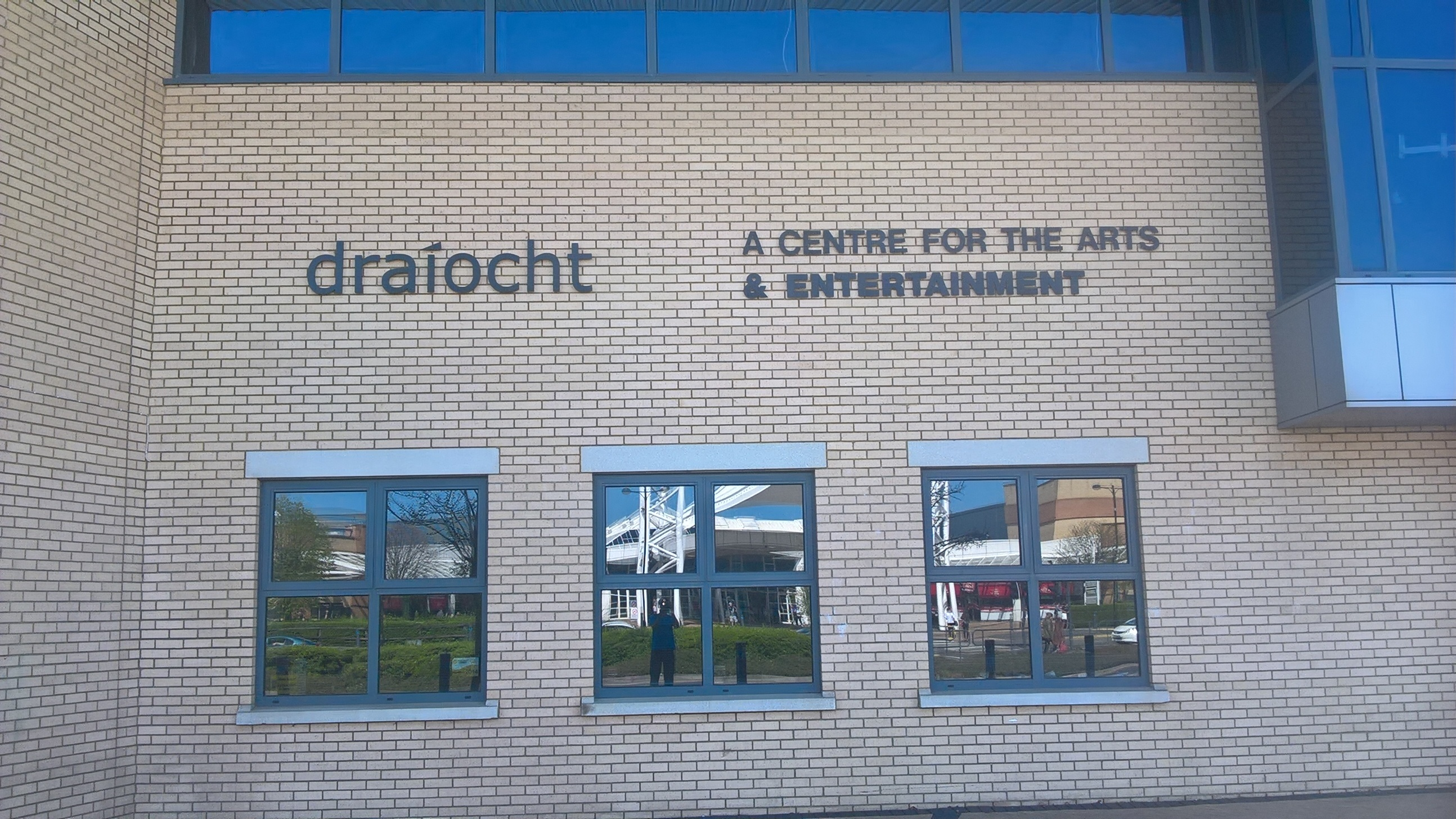
Draíocht Arts Centre

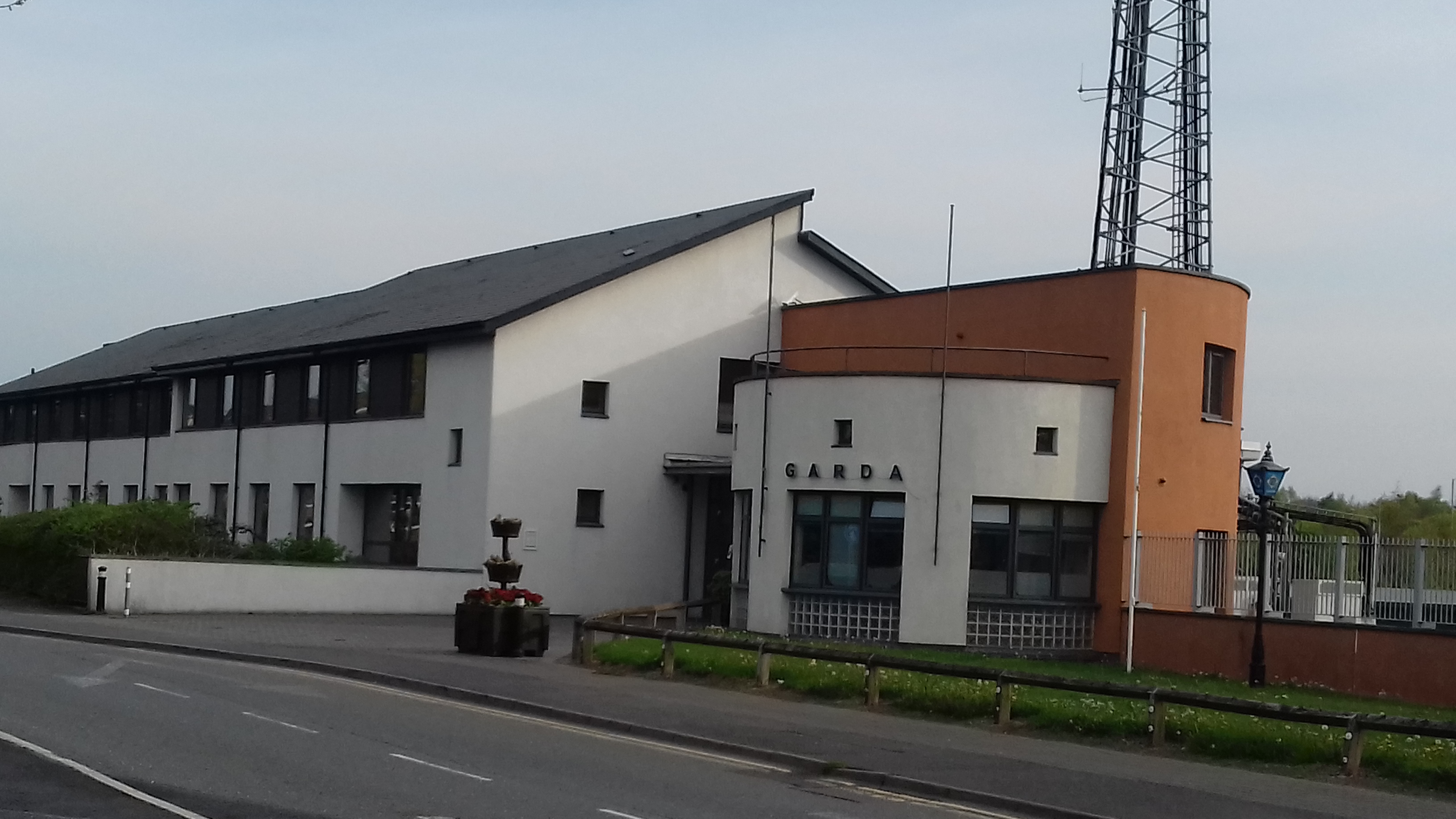
Blanchardstown Garda Station

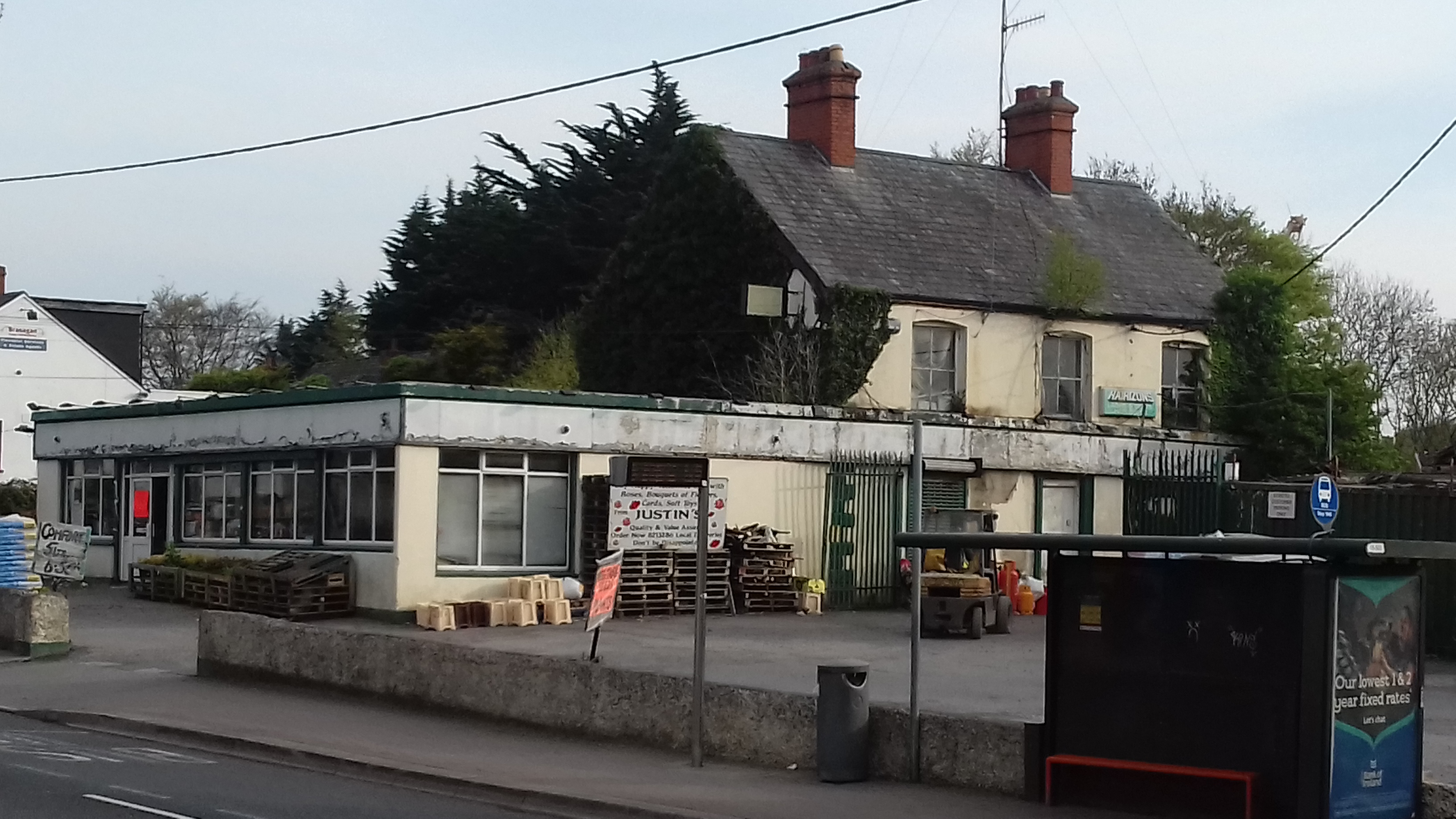
Shop on Blanchardstown's main street
