= Clonsilla =

Suburb of Dublin, Ireland

Clonsilla Cluain Saileach (Irish)
- Suburb
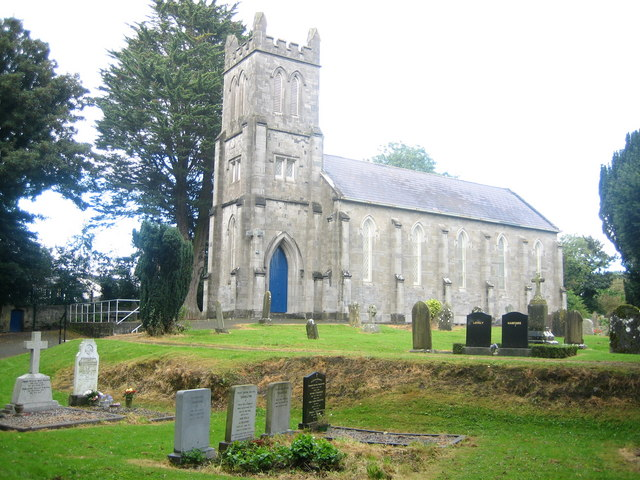
- St Mary's Church
- Interactive map of Clonsilla
- Coordinates: 53°23′N 6°25′W
- Country: Ireland
- Province: Leinster
- County: County Dublin
- Local government area: Fingal County Council
- Dáil constituency: Dublin West
- EU Parliament constituency: Dublin
- Eircode routing key: D15
- Dialing code: 01, +353 1

Clonsilla (Irish: Cluain Saileach, meaning 'meadow of the willow or sally tree') is a northwestern suburb of Dublin in Fingal, Ireland.

Clonsilla is also a civil parish in the barony of Castleknock in County Dublin.

== Location and access ==
Clonsilla used to be a village in the inner western part of County Dublin, but it is now a large residential suburban area, with Ongar and other localities developing their own subsidiary identities.

Clonsilla is roughly equidistant from the suburbs of Blanchardstown and Castleknock.

== History ==
In the late 20th and early 21st centuries, there was significant residential housing development in Clonsilla, including several new housing estates which were built between 1990 and 2005. As a result, the population of the area rose over the same period.

== Places of interest ==
Luttrellstown Castle, dating from the early 15th century and once owned by members of the Guinness family, is now a hotel and golf course.

Beechpark House, a regency villa and grounds of 22.7 acres are adjacent to the Castle and were also acquired by the castle owners in 2025 for €4.32m.

Beech Park is a public park adjacent to the house which was opened in May 2009 and is maintained by Fingal County Council. The Shackleton Gardens within Beech Park is home to a walled garden containing rare flower species. It was formerly owned by the Antarctic explorer, Ernest Shackleton.

Clonsilla straddles the Royal Canal and a railway line runs through the area.

In November 1845, the canal near Clonsilla was the scene of an accident in which 15 people drowned, including two children, on a night boat to Longford.

== Education ==
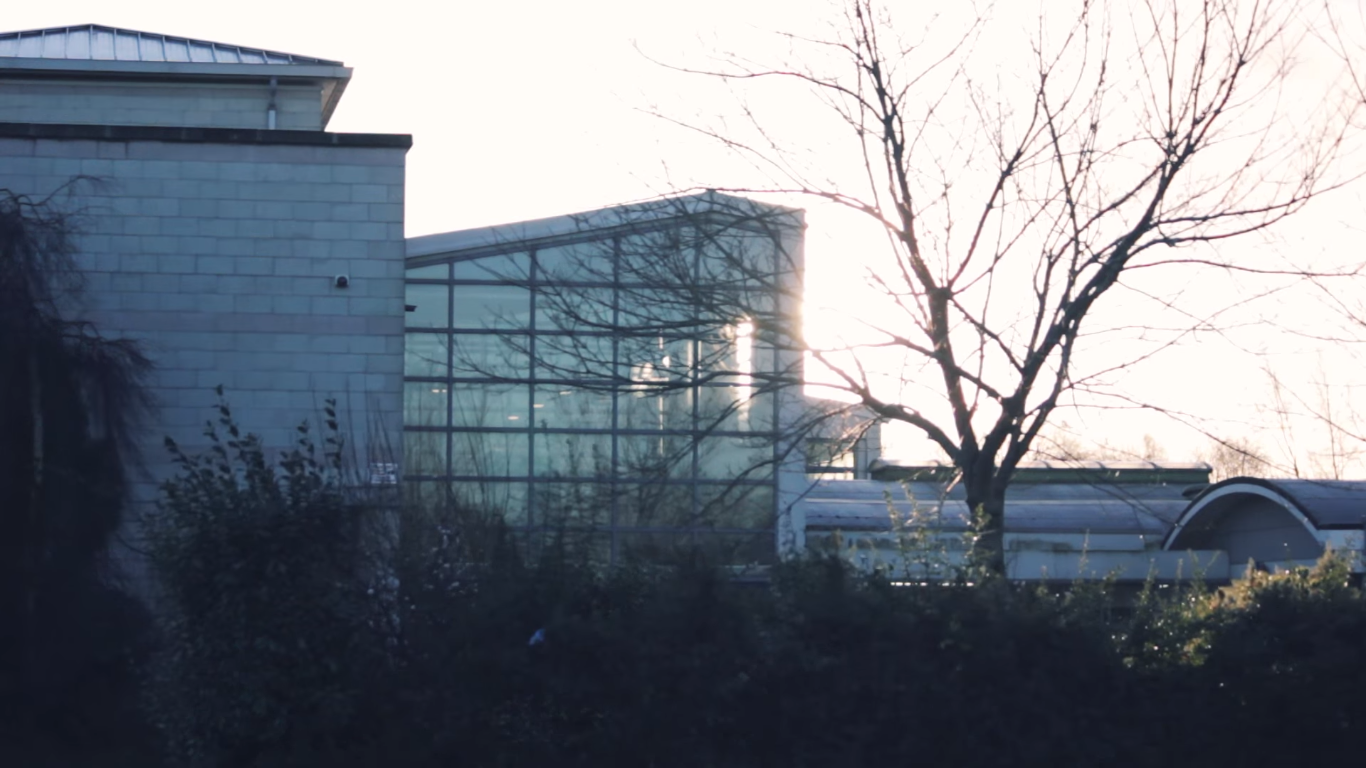
Hartstown Community School

Clonsilla has a number of national schools, including St. Mochta's, St. Patrick's, St. Philip's, St. Ciaran's (Hartstown), and Scoil Choilm Community National School (Porterstown). There are five secondary schools in the vicinity: Hartstown Community School, Castleknock Community College, Coolmine Community School, Luttrellstown Community College, and Castleknock College. There is also an Educate Together primary and second-level school located in Hansfield, Clonsilla.

== Religion ==
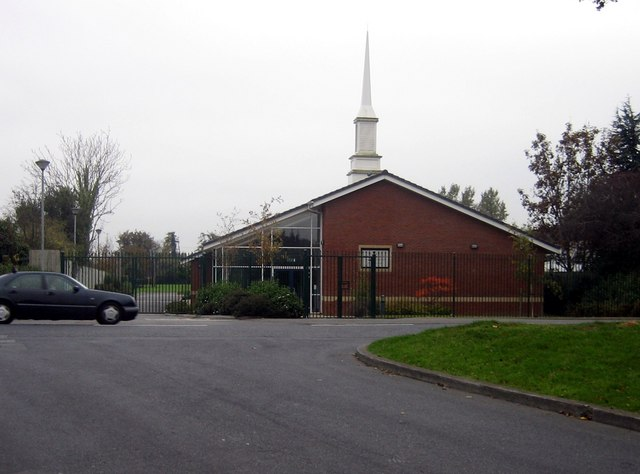
Latter-day Saints Meetinghouse, Clonsilla

Porterstown-Clonsilla is a parish in the Blanchardstown deanery of the Roman Catholic Archdiocese of Dublin. The church of St. Mochta's, located in Porterstown, serves the village proper. There are other parishes in the wider suburb.

In the Church of Ireland, the parish is part of "Castleknock and Mulhuddart with Clonsilla".

There is also a Latter-day Saints meeting house in Clonsilla.

== Transport ==
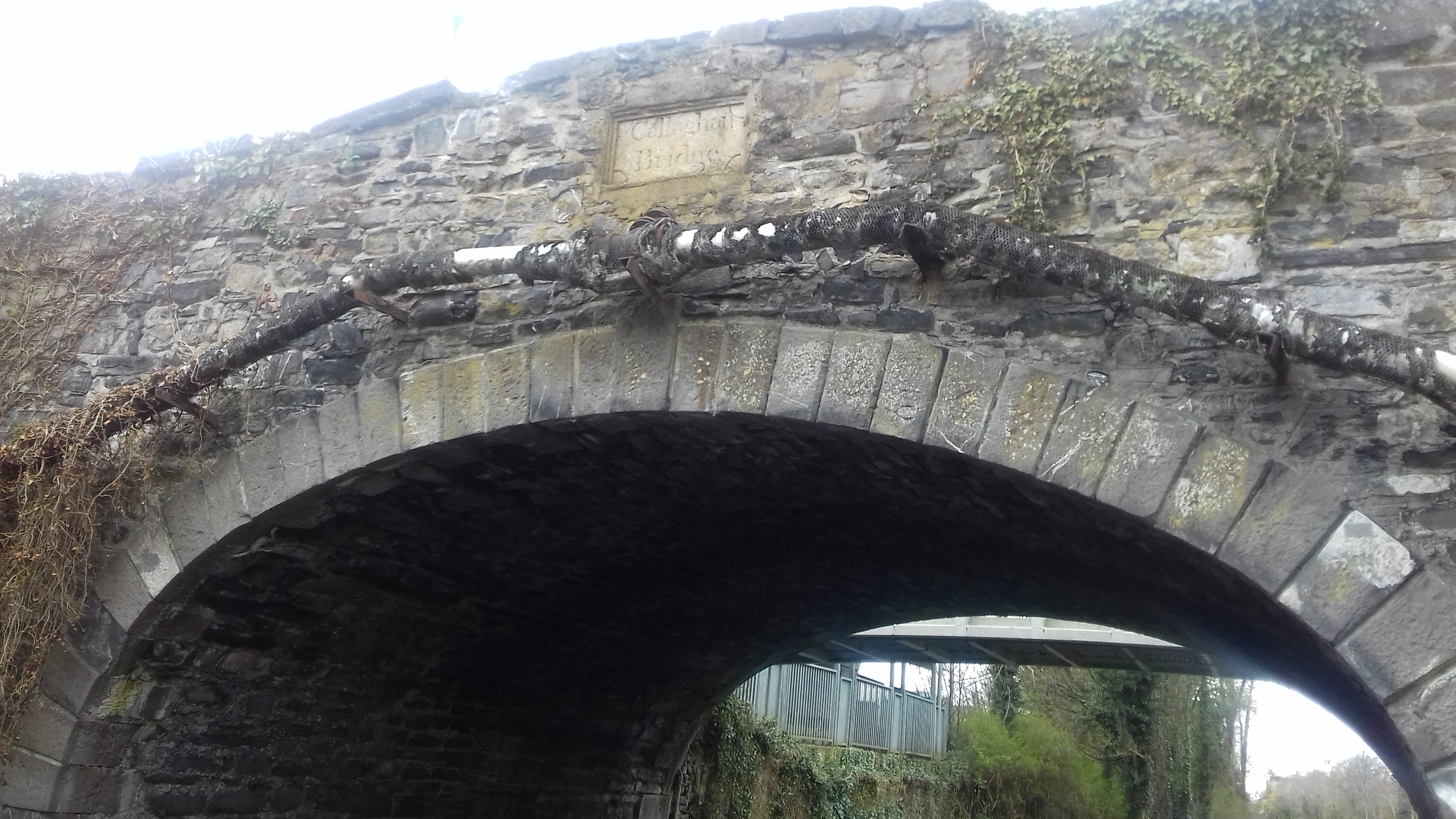
Callaghan Bridge near Clonsilla Railway Station between the 12th and 13th locks of the Royal Canal

Clonsilla railway station is an exchange station for commuter services going between Dublin and Maynooth and M3 Parkway lines. Passengers travel to Maynooth to transfer to Dublin to Sligo intercity service. Residents of Ongar and Hansfield can use Hansfield railway station.

Clonsilla is near the N3/M3 national road between Cavan and Dublin city centre.

Clonsilla is served by several Dublin Bus routes including the 39, the 39a and the L52 from Blanchardstown Shopping Centre.

== Sport ==
The local Gaelic Athletic Association clubs are St. Peregrines GAA, Castleknock Hurling and Football Club, and Westmanstown Gaels GAA club. A soccer club, St. Mochta’s F.C., plays at Porterstown Road. A karate club meets in the Clonsilla hall.

== Notable people ==
- Glen Crowe, an Irish professional football player who played for Wolves, Bohemians, Shelbourne and Sporting Fingal, and represented the Republic of Ireland national football team on two occasions. Crowe was born and raised in the Clonsilla area.
- Mark Kennedy, former professional footballer, is from Clonsilla and started his career at St.Mochta's FC.
- Thomas Luttrell of Luttrellstown Castle (died 1554) Chief Justice of the Irish Common Pleas, was buried in Clonsilla and left a bequest to build a chapel in his memory.

== See also ==
- List of towns and villages in Ireland
