= Hartstown Community School =

Coordinates: 53.39610°N 6.41594°W

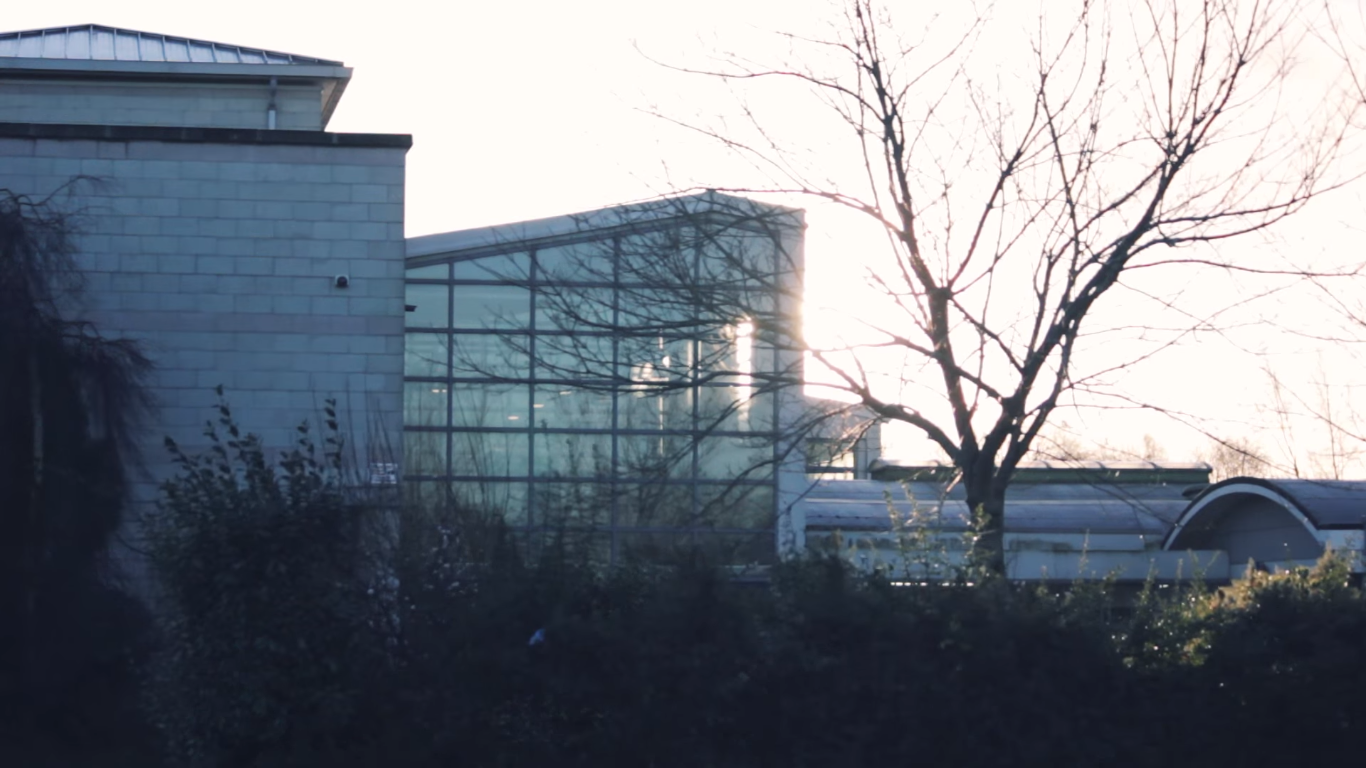
- Clonsilla; Ireland

Information
- Type: Secondary school
- Principal: Lucia Ryan
- Website: www.hartstowncommunityschool.com/l

Hartstown Community School is an Irish Secondary School located in Hartstown, Clonsilla. It serves the area of Hartstown, Huntstown and other localities in the Clonsilla suburb.

Hartstown / Huntstown Community School is a co-educational, multi-denominational Community School founded in 1992 to cater for the educational needs of Hartstown & Huntstown 2nd level pupils. There is also an Adult Education Programme which caters for the wider community of Hartstown and the surrounding areas.

The miniseries Normal People was filmed at the Hartstown Community School, featuring real-life students in the background.
