= Huntstown, Ohio =

Human settlement in the United States

Coordinates: 41°0′20″N 84°18′12″W

Huntstown is a ghost town in Putnam County, in the U.S. state of Ohio.

== History ==
Huntstown was platted in 1883. A post office was established at Huntstown in 1879, and remained in operation until 1896.
