= William Mooney (cricketer) =

Irish cricketer

Personal information
- Full name: William McCartan Joseph Mooney
- Born: 5 October 1890; Blanchardstown, Ireland
- Died: 11 September 1967 (aged 76); Dublin, Leinster, Ireland
- Batting: Right-handed

Domestic team information
- Years: Team
- 1912: Ireland

Career statistics
Competition	First-class
Matches	3
Runs scored	25
Batting average	5.00
100s/50s	–/–
Top score	23*
Catches/stumpings	3/–
- Source: Cricinfo, 26 October 2018

William McCartan Joseph Mooney (5 October 1890 – 11 September 1967) was an Irish first-class cricketer.

Born at Blanchardstown, Mooney received his education in England at Beaumont College, before going up to Brasenose College, Oxford. At Oxford, Mooney was a member of several university societies, such as the University Athletics Club. Playing his club cricket back in Ireland for Phoenix, Mooney first played for the Gentlemen of Ireland on their 1909 tour of North America, playing minor matches against Ottawa, All New York, Baltimore, and Philadelphia Colts. He made his debut in first-class cricket on the tour, playing two first-class matches against the Gentlemen of Philadelphia at Haverford and Philadelphia. He later played a first-class match for Ireland against Scotland at Dublin in 1912. Playing as a specialist batsman in his three first-class matches, he scored just 25 runs from six innings, with a highest score of 23 not out. He served in the British Army during World War I, serving with the Duke of Cornwall's Light Infantry, where he reached the rank of captain. He died at Dublin in September 1967.
