= Blanchardstown Centre =

Large retail facility in Dublin's western suburbs

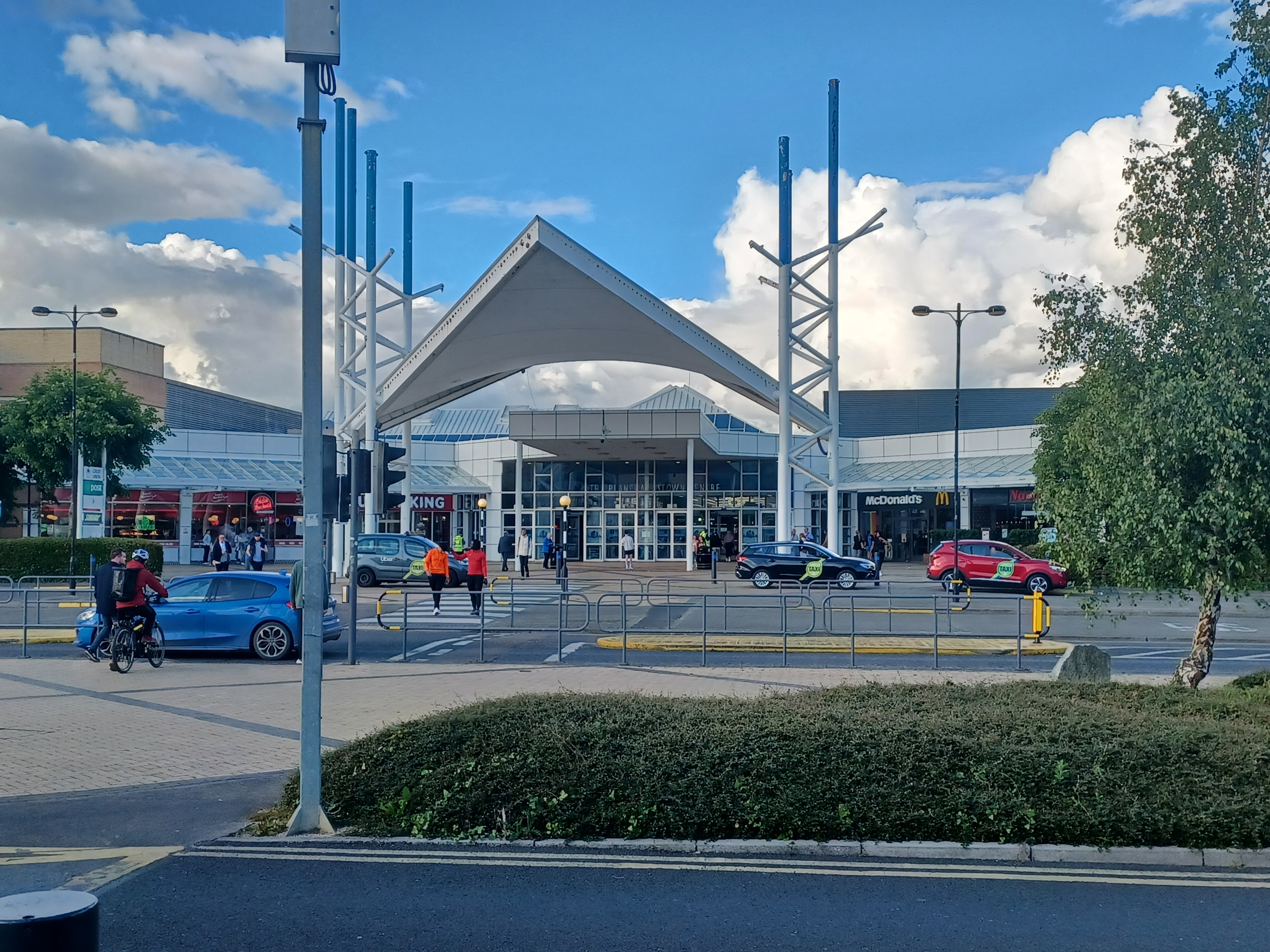
- Blanchardstown Centre entrance
- Location: Blanchardstown, Dublin, Ireland
- Coordinates: 53.393°N 6.389°W
- Opened: 16 October 1996; 30 years ago
- Owner: Strategic Value Partnerships (Formerly: Goldman Sachs, Blackstone Group, Green Property)
- Num. of stores: 180 in-centre stores (plus other outlet retailers)
- Num. of anchor tenants: 4
- Floor area: (Core centre) 112,000 m^{2} (1,200,000 sq ft), (Total incl. retail parks)159,000 m^{2} (1,700,000 sq ft)
- Floors: 2
- Parking: 7,000
- Website: blanchardstowncentre.ie

The Blanchardstown Centre is one of Ireland's two largest shopping complexes, located in Blanchardstown and Coolmine, western suburbs of Dublin, Ireland. It opened in October 1996 and was extended in 2004 to create extra retail space. It lies in the administrative area of Fingal County Council.

The Blanchardstown Centre has an annual footfall of 16.5 million, and is served by over 600 bus movements per day, and is close to Dublin's M50 radial motorway, and adjacent to the M3 motorway.

In June 2016, the centre was sold to the Blackstone Group by Green Property for an estimated €950m, making it the most expensive property ever sold in Ireland; Blackstone in turn sold it to Goldman Sachs, who put it back on the market mid-2023. In November 2024, it was bought by Strategic Value Partnerships.

== History ==
In 1988, architect and town planner Patrick Shaffrey wrote of the proposed centre and its potential to affect Dublin city:

...one of the major objectives in the Draft Development Plan is to maintain the primacy of Dublin city centre as the shopping focus of the region, the Corporation made no formal submission to a recent planning appeal which was determining an application for the new shopping centre in Blanchardstown of approximately 1,000,000 square feet the largest ever proposed in the country, and which, if constructed, would seriously undermine the shopping and cultural base of the City Centre.

The construction of the shopping centre, undertaken by Sisk Group, started in 1994 and was completed in 1996.

== Stores ==
The centre contains over 180 stores, including banking outlets and dining facilities, three retail parks and 7,000 free car parking spaces. The anchor stores in the shopping centre itself include Dunnes, Penney's, and Marks and Spencer. A former anchor, Debenhams Ireland, was closed in April 2020, however the unit was subdivided into two with Flannels and Zara taking the units, which opened in late 2022. Other tenants include H&M, Superdry Store, Vero Moda, Jack & Jones, River Island, JD, BT2 and Zara. The Blanchardstown Centre is also home to Ireland's largest TK Maxx store, Lifestyle Sports and 53 Degrees North, all of which are located in the "fashion park". Surrounding the centre are three retail parks, two of which are part of the centre, whilst the other, WestEnd Retail Park, is operated separately and features stores such as Lidl, Dealz, Nike Outlet, Heatons and Next. Harvey Norman, Smyths Toys, Currys PC World, Waltons Music, Elvery's Sports and DFS are also located in the retail parks around the centre.

The complex includes a 9-screen cinema operated by Odeon Cinemas and a Leisureplex entertainment centre.

== Non-retail developments ==
Other amenities located in or adjacent to the centre include the Draíocht arts centre, as well as Ireland's "largest purpose-built public library". The centre itself has a Catholic oratory which is maintained by the Capuchin Franciscan Order.

At the time of building, the greater Blanchardstown area had a population of over 120,000. In the period that followed the 1996 opening of the retail spaces, additional commercial and office spaces were leased to eBay, Fingal County Council and Liberty Insurance - who relocated their headquarters to the site, bringing "over 1,300 staff to the area daily". The Crowne Plaza hotel chain also built a four-star 200-bedroom hotel within the development in 2008.

== Plans ==
From early 2009, plans had been published which set to extend the centre by 38,500 sq ft (3,580 m^{2}) with a new "Yellow Mall" extension. These plans included a three-storey complex with a new anchor store, 17 new shops and a food court located on the second floor, as well as a two-storey underground carpark. These plans proposed eight new restaurants for the exterior. As of January 2016, when the centre was put up for sale, these plans had not been executed. In June 2016, the centre was sold (together with this planning approval) to the Blackstone Group by Green Property for an estimated €950m. Blackstone sold it on to Goldman Sachs at a lower price, and mid-2023, Goldman put it on the market again.

== Transport ==
The centre is served by Dublin Bus routes 37, 39/a and N4 as well as Go-Ahead Ireland routes 220, 236/a/t, 238, 270/t, L52 and W4. Additionally, the nearby Crowne Plaza hotel is served by Bus Éireann routes 105, 109/b/x, 111/x and NX.
