= Hansfield railway station =

Station near Dublin, Ireland

Hansfield Páirc Hans
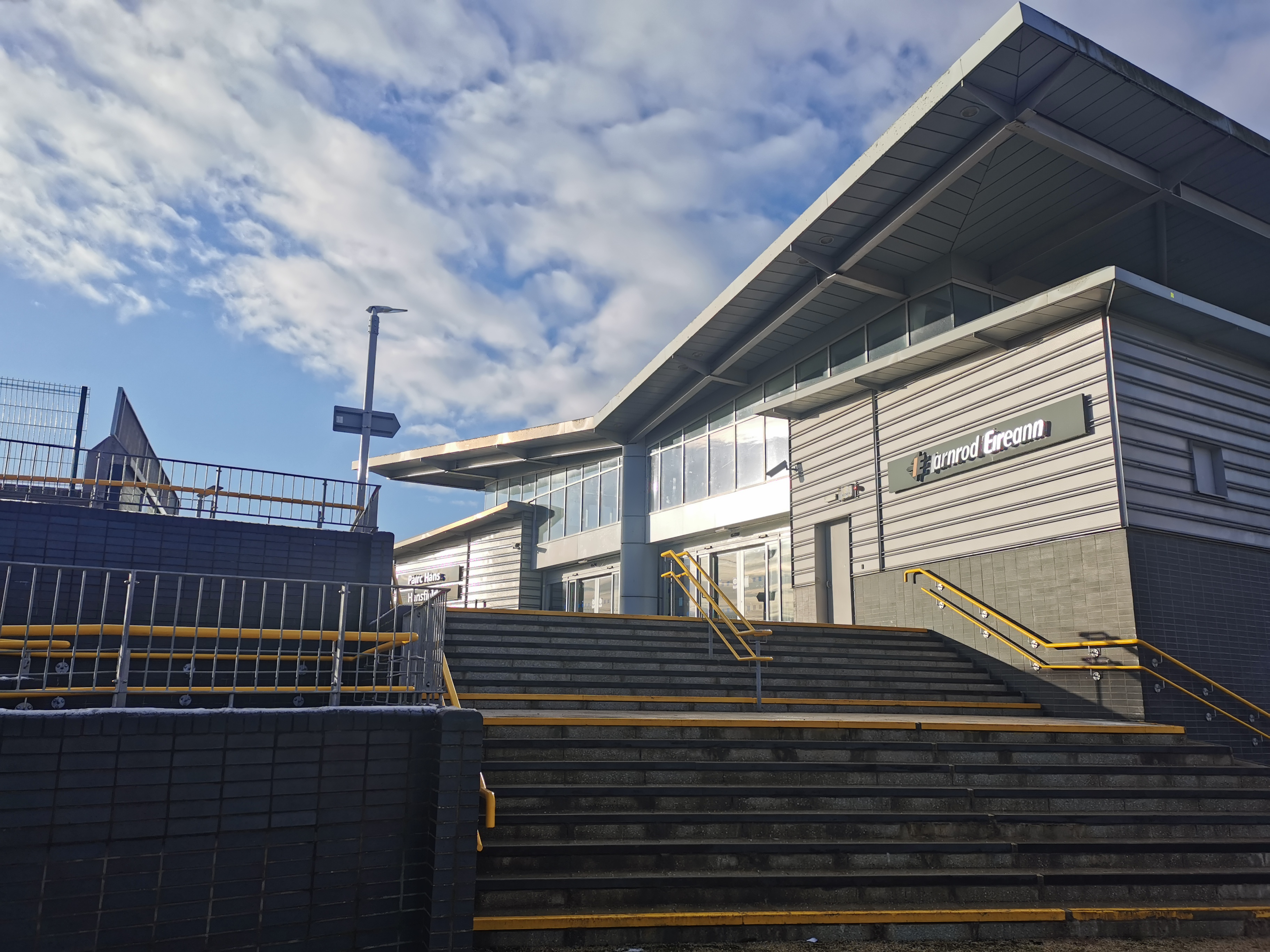
- The station's building, on Station Road.

General information
- Location: Station Road, Hansfield, Dublin 15; Ireland
- Coordinates: 53°23′12.8″N 6°26′37.6″W
- Owner: Iarnród Éireann
- Operator: Iarnród Éireann
- Platforms: 2

Construction
- Structure type: At-grade

Other information
- Station code: HAFLD
- Fare zone: Suburban 2

History
- Opened: 28 June 2013
Location

Hansfield railway station is a railway station in County Dublin, Ireland. It lies on the Docklands to M3 Parkway Commuter service and serves housing estates including Hansfield, Ongar, Littlepace, and Barnwell, among others; it is also the station nearest Clonee.

== Services at Hansfield station ==
The station is served by 47 trains Monday to Friday, and offers a typical journey time of 39 minutes to/from Docklands railway station at peak.

Passengers can travel to Docklands, Broombridge, Ashtown, Navan Road Parkway, Castleknock, and Coolmine at peak times Monday to Friday only. Direct travel is possible to Clonsilla, Dunboyne and M3 Parkway on services 7 days a week.

Passengers transfer at Clonsilla:

- to travel at non-peak times (including Saturday and Sunday) towards Dublin city centre.
- to travel to Maynooth and both Leixlip stations. Transfer at Maynooth for InterCity services to Sligo.
- to travel to Drumcondra. Only Maynooth to Dublin services serve Drumcondra.

== History ==
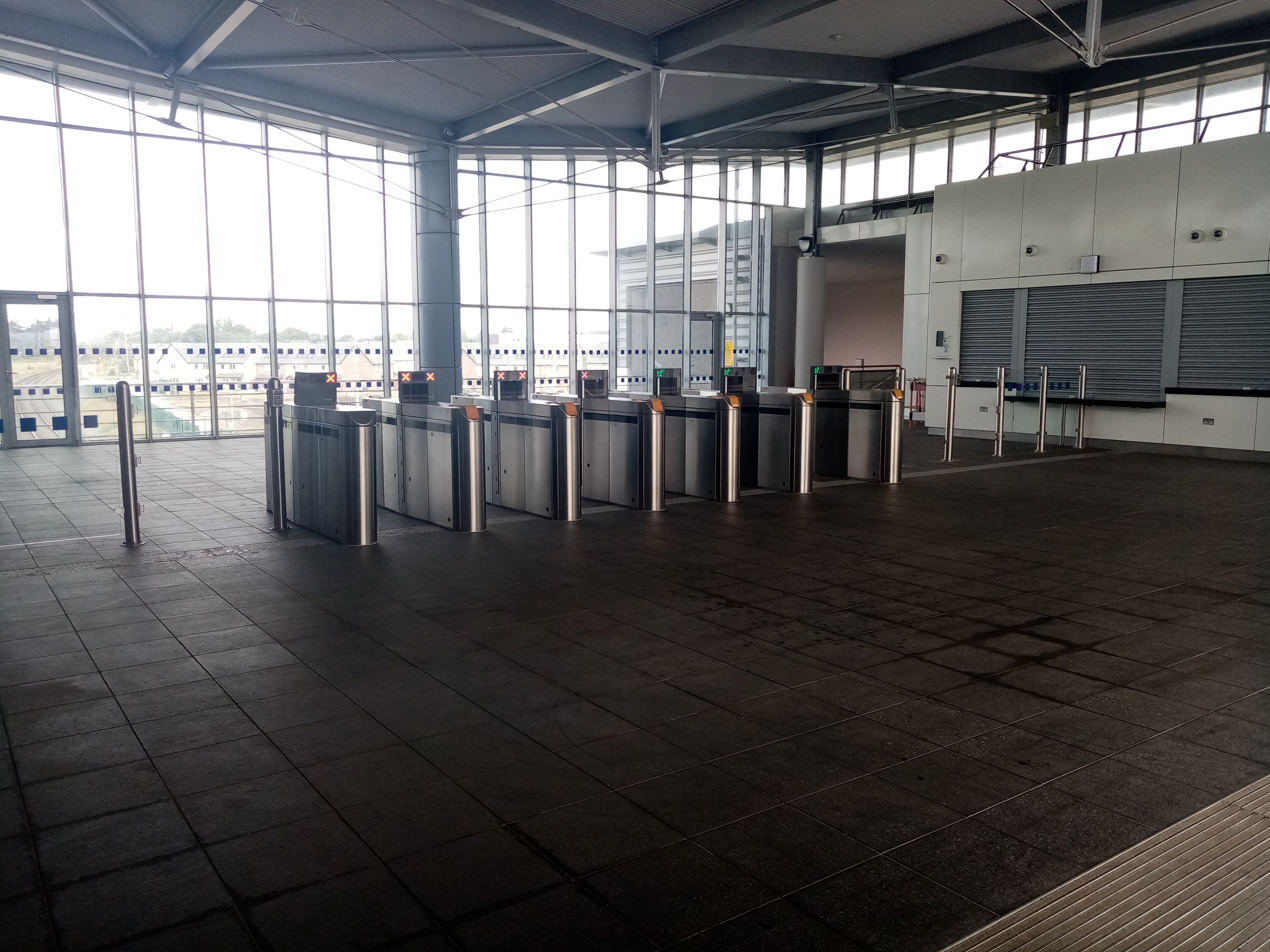
The stations interior, featuring a row of ticket gates and an unstaffed ticket office.

The station was planned by Fingal County Council as part of Hansfield Strategic Development Zone. While the railway line was opened in September 2010 as planned, Hansfield station remained closed because no road access to the station from the surrounding housing estates existed. When funding was provided in 2011 for the access road, Iarnród Éireann took possession of land to proceed. The station opened on Friday 28 June 2013.

== Gallery ==
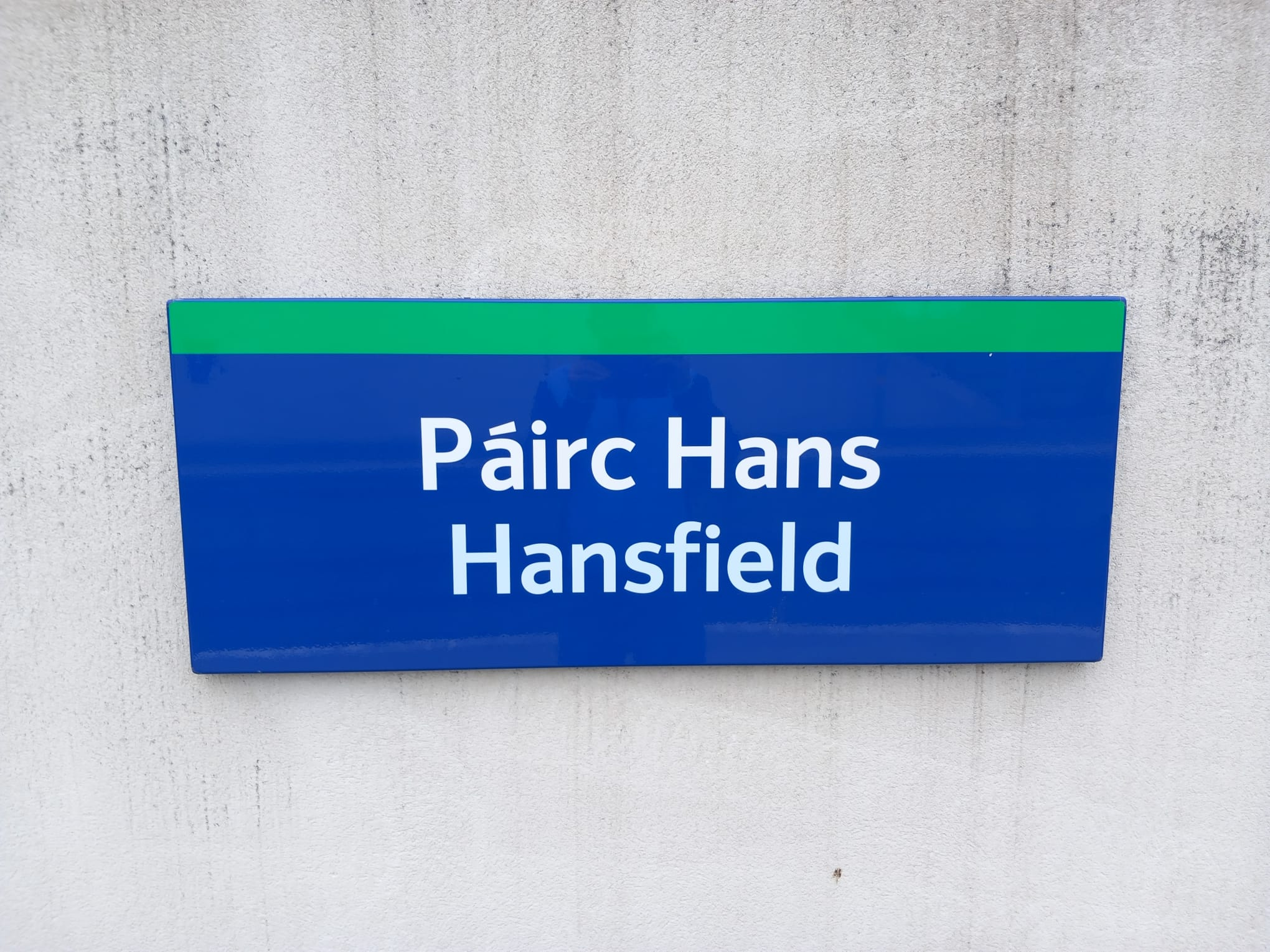

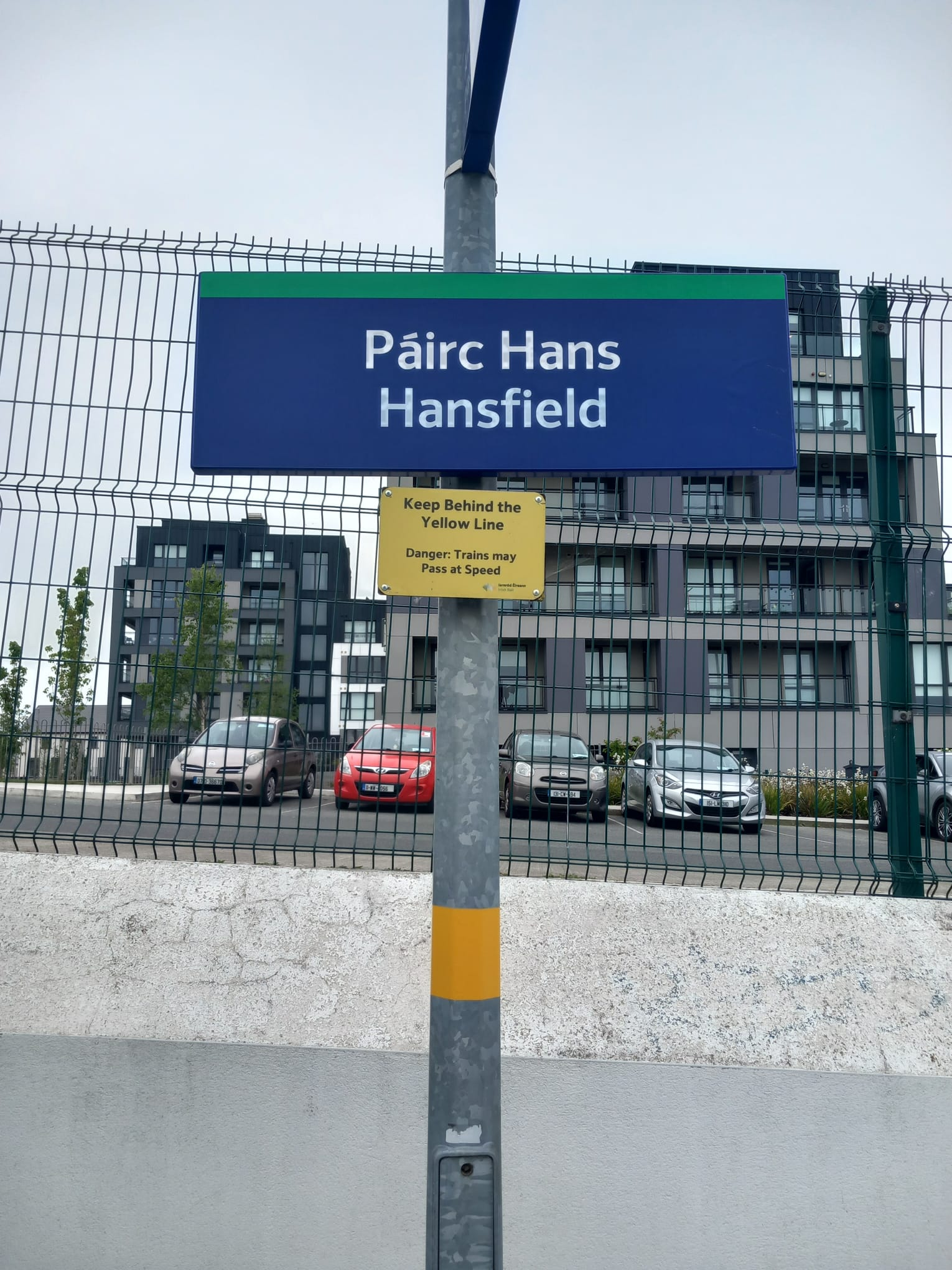

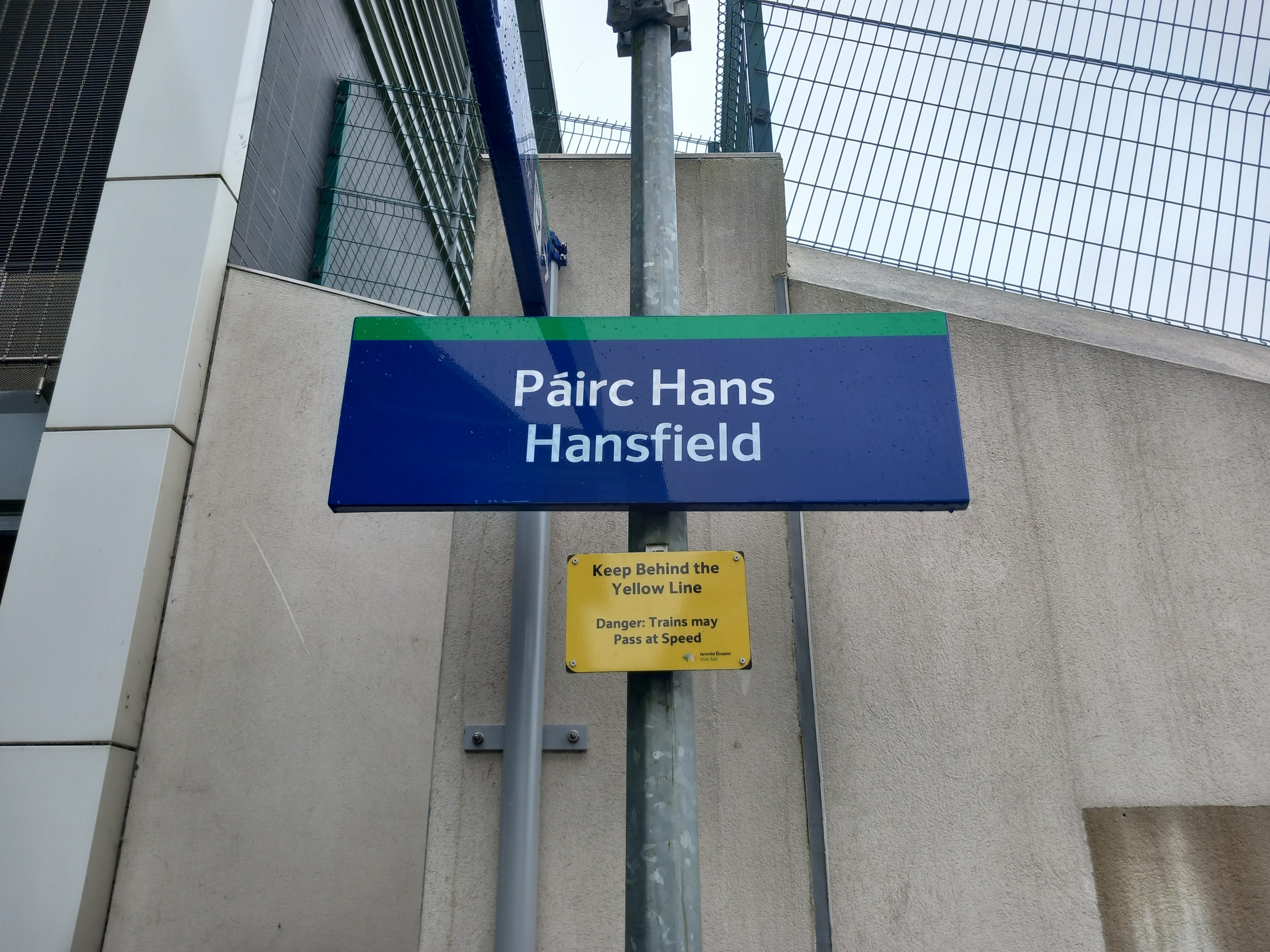

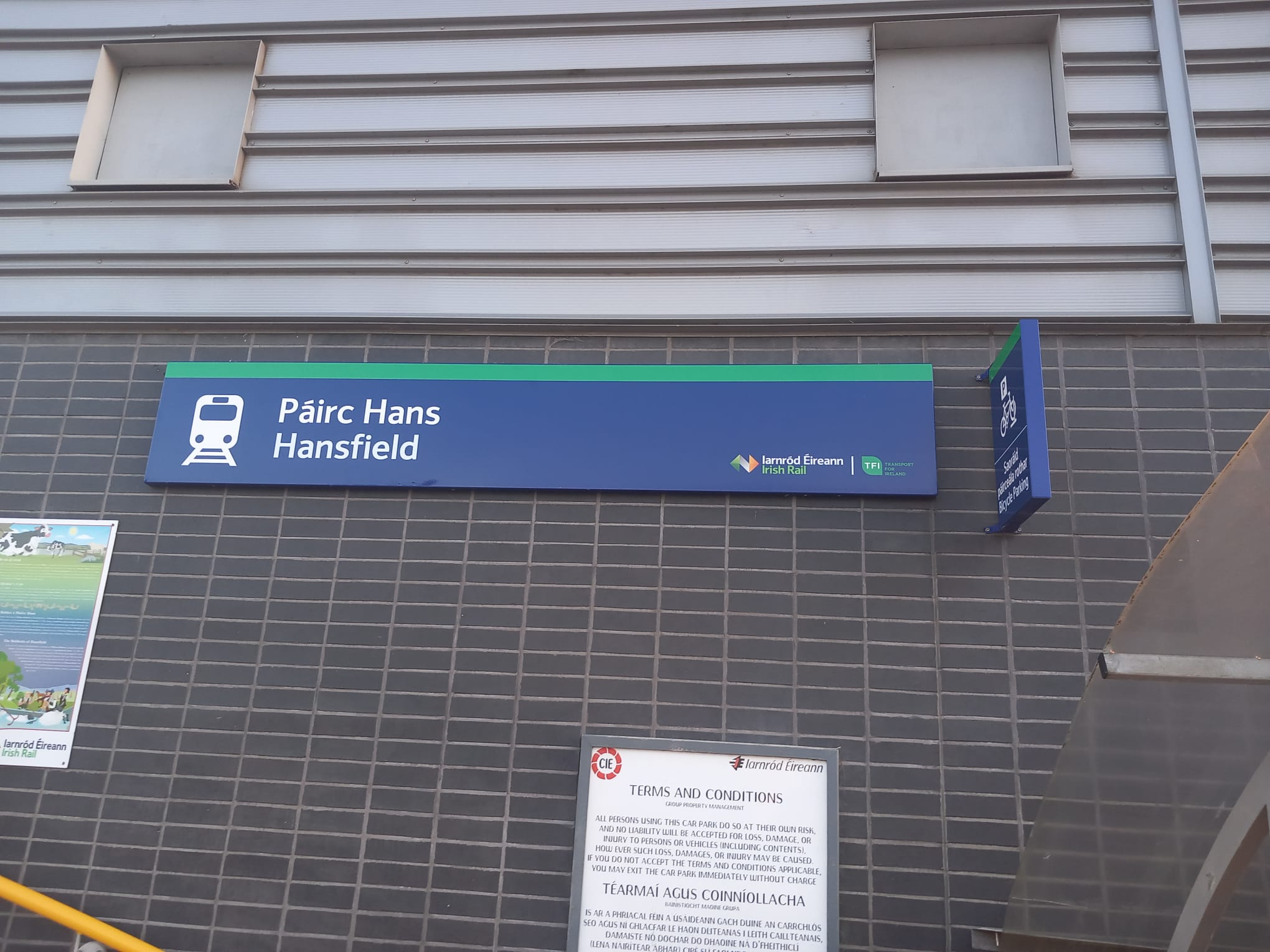

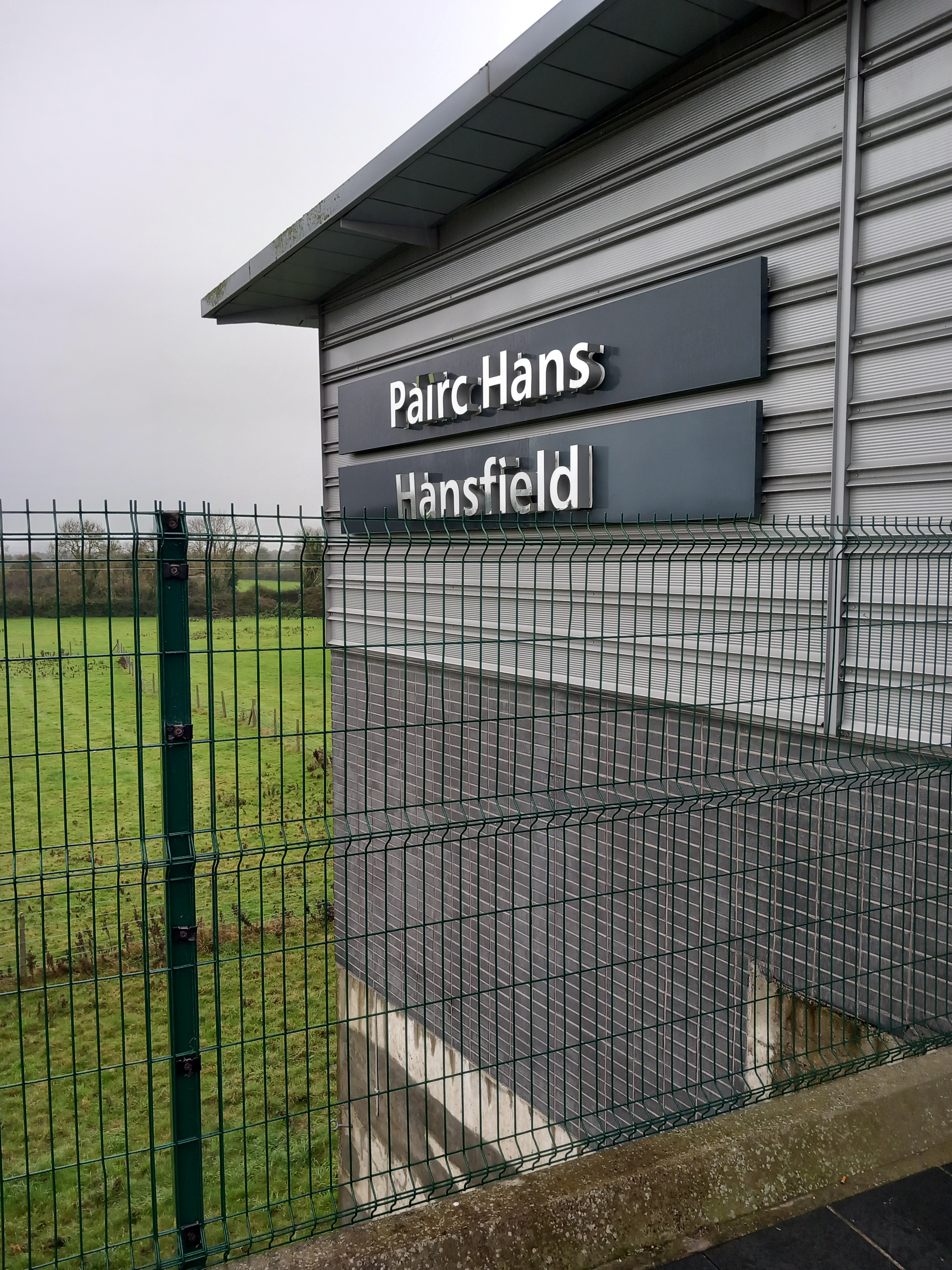

== See also ==
- List of railway stations in Ireland

Preceding station	Iarnród Éireann	Following station
Clonsilla	Commuter; Western Commuter	Dunboyne
	Future	
Clonsilla	DART	Dunboyne
