= Clonsilla (civil parish) =

Civil parish and townland in Fingal, Ireland

Clonsilla (Irish: Cluain Saileach) or "Clonsillagh" is a civil parish and a townland located in the south-western corner of the modern county of Fingal, Ireland. The civil parish is part of the ancient barony of Castleknock. It is centred on the suburban village of Clonsilla. In geology, the parish rests on a substratum of limestone and comprises 2943 statute acres, the whole of which is arable land. It is roughly bounded to the north by the old "Navan Road" – the modern N3; to the east by the civil parish of Castleknock; to the south by the River Liffey; to the south-east by the civil parish of Leixlip, chiefly in County Kildare, and to the north-west by the civil parish of Dunboyne in County Meath.

== History ==
During the sixth century Saint Mochta, a bishop and the "last survivor of St. Patrick's disciples", founded a monastery at Clonsilla. Mochta's mother, 'Cainer of Cluain-da-Saileach', was also mother to a number of other male saints.

In 1831, there were 943 inhabitants in the parish of whom 770 were Catholics. By 1837, according to Lewis' "Topography of Ireland", the parish contained 954 inhabitants. Lewis recorded that Luttrelestown demesne was the most notable seat in the parish. It was the residence of Col. Thomas White who was the second son of Luke White. Lewis observed that, "The demesne includes above 648 statute acres, exceedingly picturesque; the mansion is a noble building, in the castellated style.".

The parish formerly belonged to the priory of Malvern, in Worcestershire. In 1773, an Act of the Privy Council united the parish with the curacies of Castleknock and Mulhuddart. In 1837, the tithes amounted to £240.

=== Ecclesiastical parishes ===
Like all civil parishes, this civil parish is derived from, and co-extensive with a pre-existing ecclesiastical parish of the same name, as used in the Church of Ireland. In the Archdiocese of Dublin, the parish is today united with Castleknock and Mulhuddart in the "Grouped Parishes of Castleknock and Mulhuddart with Clonsilla". (Note: Church of Ireland - Grouped Parishes of Castleknock and Mulhuddart with Clonsilla) There are three extant church buildings that are still in use by the grouped parish:

- St. Brigid's, Castleknock, situated in the centre of Castleknock. The building - a listed national monument - was constructed in 1870. (Note: Saint Brigid's Church of Ireland Church, Castleknock Road, CASTLEKNOCK (WITHOUT PHOENIX PARK), Castleknock, Fingal - Register number 11362003) It features a three-stage tower to the west gable with a Gothic tympanum at the entrance and a stained glass window by Harry Clarke that is dedicated to Saint Hubert.
- St. Thomas', Mulhuddart, situated on the Kilbride Road near Hollystown Golf Club. The building - a listed national monument - was constructed in 1870. (Note: Saint Thomas's Church of Ireland Church, Ratoath Road, HOLLYSTOWN, Fingal - Register number 11346001) It features a polygonal bell tower in the south corner.
- St. Mary's, Clonsilla, situated at the western end of the Clonsilla Road near Clonsilla railway station. The building - a listed national monument - was constructed in 1846. (Note: Saint Mary's Church of Ireland Church, CLONSILLA, Clonsilla, Fingal - Register number 11353005) It features stained glass windows by Evie Hone.

In the Catholic Church, the territory of the civil parish is part of the Archdiocese of Dublin. It is currently divided between the following ecclesiastical parishes :

- "St. Mochta's", Porterstown. (Note: Parish of St. Mochta, Porterstown-Clonsilla) (Note: Catholic Church - St Mochta's parish)
- "Mountview / Blakestown". The sole church building of the combined parishes is "St Philip, the Apostle", Mountview. (Note: Catholic Church - St Philip, the Apostle parish) The church of "Mary of the Servants", Blakestown (Note: Catholic Church - Mary of the Servants parish) was closed indefinitely on 7 January 2018. (Note: Parish of Blakestown)
- "St. Ciarán's", Hartstown. (Note: Parish of Hartstown) (Note: Catholic Church - St Ciarán's parish)

=== History Gallery ===
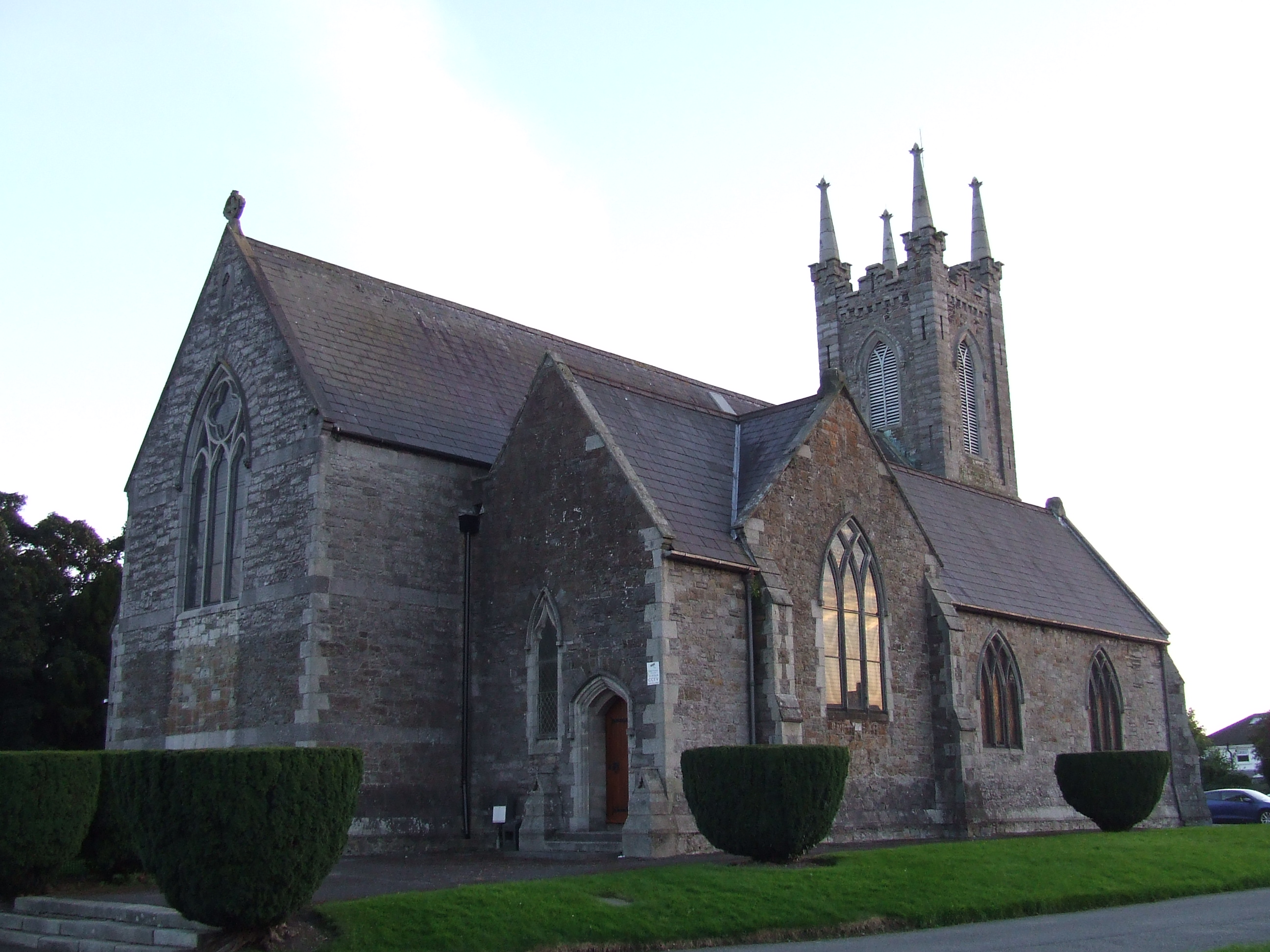
St. Bridget's church, Castleknock

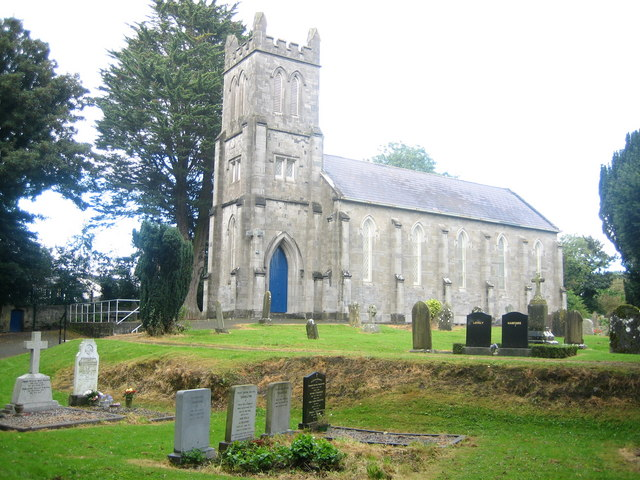
St. Mary's church, Clonsilla

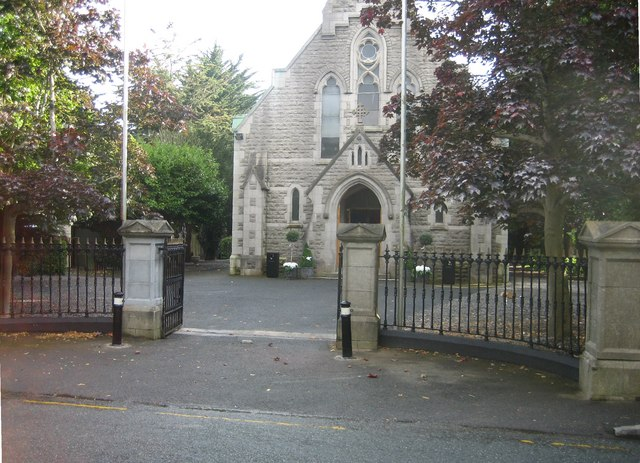
St. Mochta's parish church

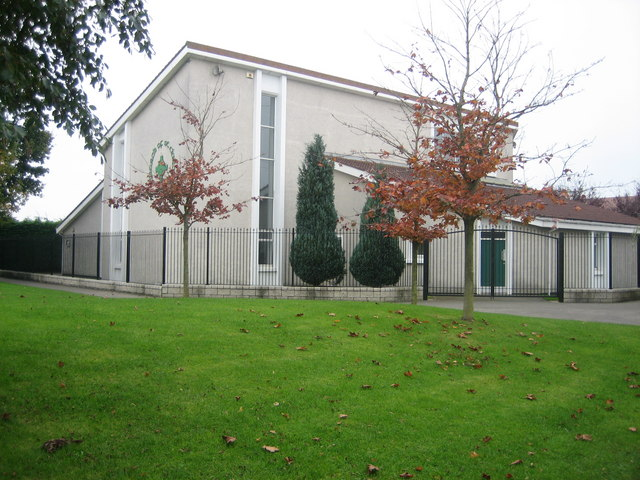
St. Ciaran's parish church at Hartstown

== Location and composition ==
The whole parish is within the Dublin 15 postal district and the territory of Fingal County Council. The core of the parish is centred on the townland and village of the same name. The townland at the northern extremity is Castaheany on the border with County Meath. The most easterly townland is Coolmine which is the location of Blanchardstown Shopping Centre. The most southerly townlands are Broomfield and Astagob which run down to the River Liffey. The most westerly townland is Barnhill which borders the part of Leixlip that lies in Fingal.

=== Townlands ===
In the seventeenth century, the parish comprised the following townlands: Ballstown, Barberstown, Blackstaheney, Barnageeth, Clonsillagh, Coolmine, Cusanstown, Hartstown, Huntstown, Ininstown, Killiestown, Luttrellstown, Pibblestown, Ringwellstown, and Little Stackheney. The table below lists the thirteen townlands currently in the parish.

Name in Irish	Name in English	Acres	Image
Baile an Bhearbóraigh	Barberstown	166	Packenham Bridge at Barberstown
Baile an Bhlácaigh	Blakestown	104	
Baile an Hartaigh	Hartstown	181	St. Ciaran's church at Hartstown
Baile Uí Cheallaigh	Kellystown	174	
Cluain Saileach	Clonsilla	382	Tower of St. Mary's church at Clonsila
Cnoc an Sciobóil	Barnhill	190	Packenham Bridge looking south-west at Barnhill
Cúil Mhín	Coolmine	609	Coolmine woods at Coolmine
Fearann na Coille	Woodlands	571	Luttrellstown Golf Club at Woodlands
Gort na Giolcaí	Broomfield	24	Broomfield entrance gates
Móinteán na gCaorach	Sheepmoor	161	Sheepmmor townland & surrounding townlands
Páirc Hans nó Baile Fiobail	Hansfield or Phibblestown	223	Ongar village at Hansfield
Steach Gob	Astagob	162	St. Mochta's parish church at Astagob
Teach Chainnigh	Castaheany	302	Coláiste Pobail Setanta at Castaheaney

== Features ==
The River Liffey, flowing from west to east, forms the southern boundary of the parish. To the north, the Royal Canal also bisects the parish from west to east between the 13th and 12th locks. Four bridges cross the canal: Pakenham Bridge near Barberstown level crossing; an Irish Rail bridge carrying the Hansfield branch line; Callaghan Bridge near Clonsilla level crossing; and Kirkpatrick Bridge at Coolmine level crossing. Kennan Bridge near Porterstown level crossing and the new L3036 bridge on Diswellstown Road, although located between the aforementioned bridges, lie outside the bounds of the parish. The church and graveyard of St. Mary in the Church of Ireland, is located near Clonsilla railway station.

Luttrellstown Castle – dating from the early 15th century and once owned by members of the Guinness family, it is now a hotel with associated golf course. The Luttrelstown stream, flowing through the demesne, falls into the Liffey near the gate lodge on the Strawberry Beds road.

St. Joseph's Centre, a care home of the Daughters of Charity, is located near the village.

The following secondary schools are situated in the parish: Coláiste Pobail Setanta at Casteheany (multi denominational) Hartstown Community School (multi denominational), Coolmine Community School (inter denominational), and Hansfield Secondary School (Educate Together patronage).

=== Features gallery ===
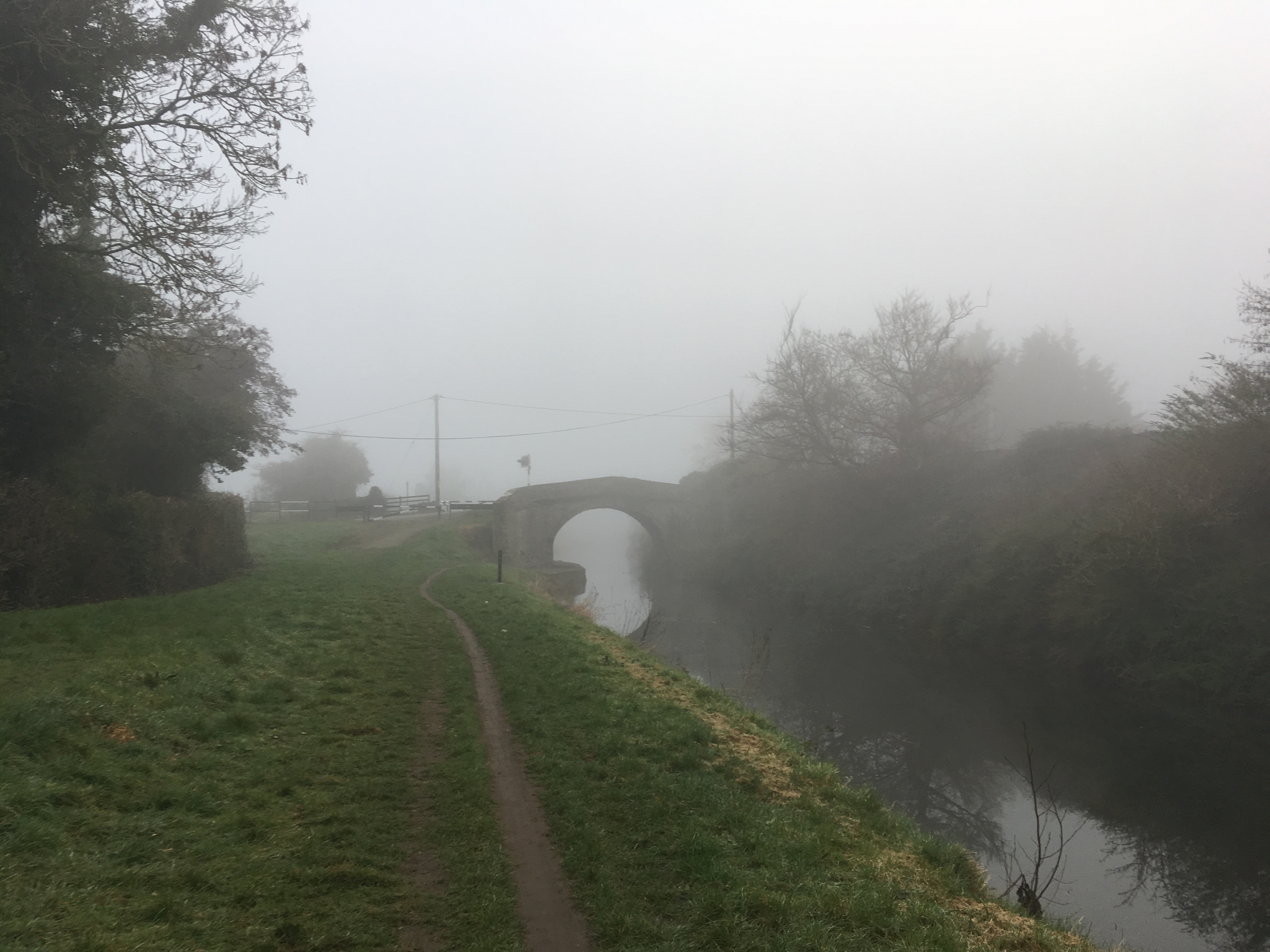
Packenham Bridge

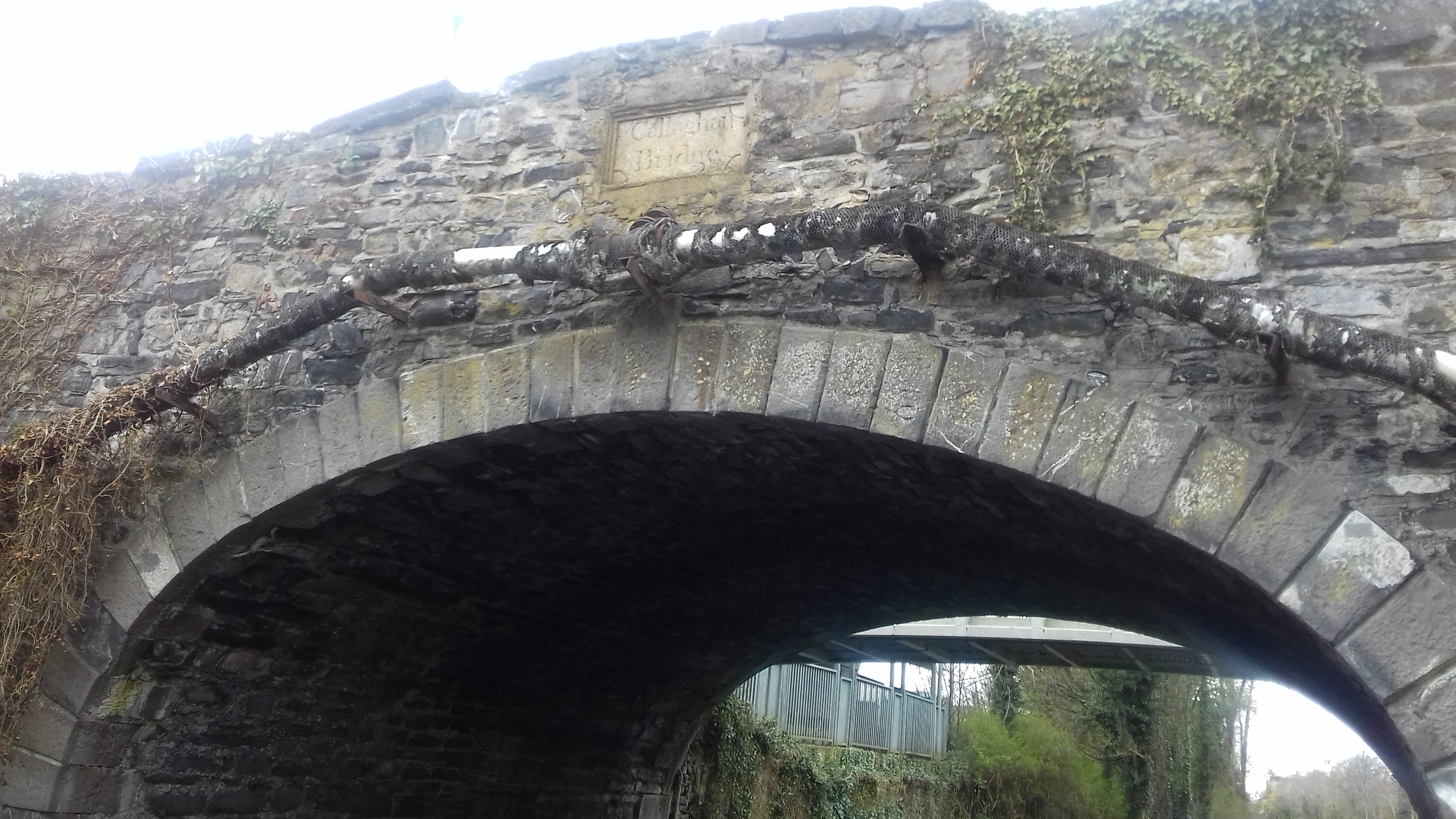
Callaghan Bridge

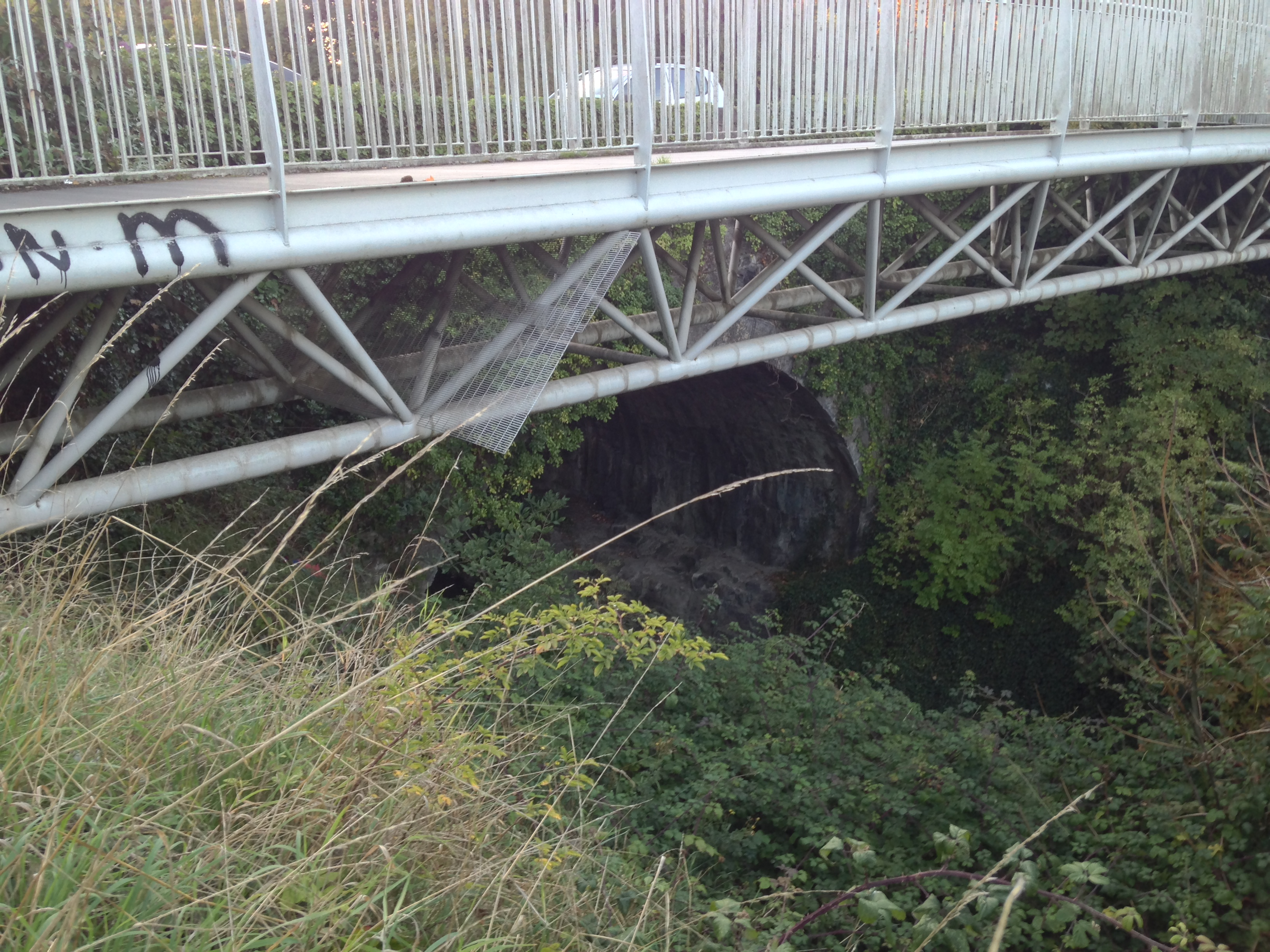
Kirkpatrick Bridge

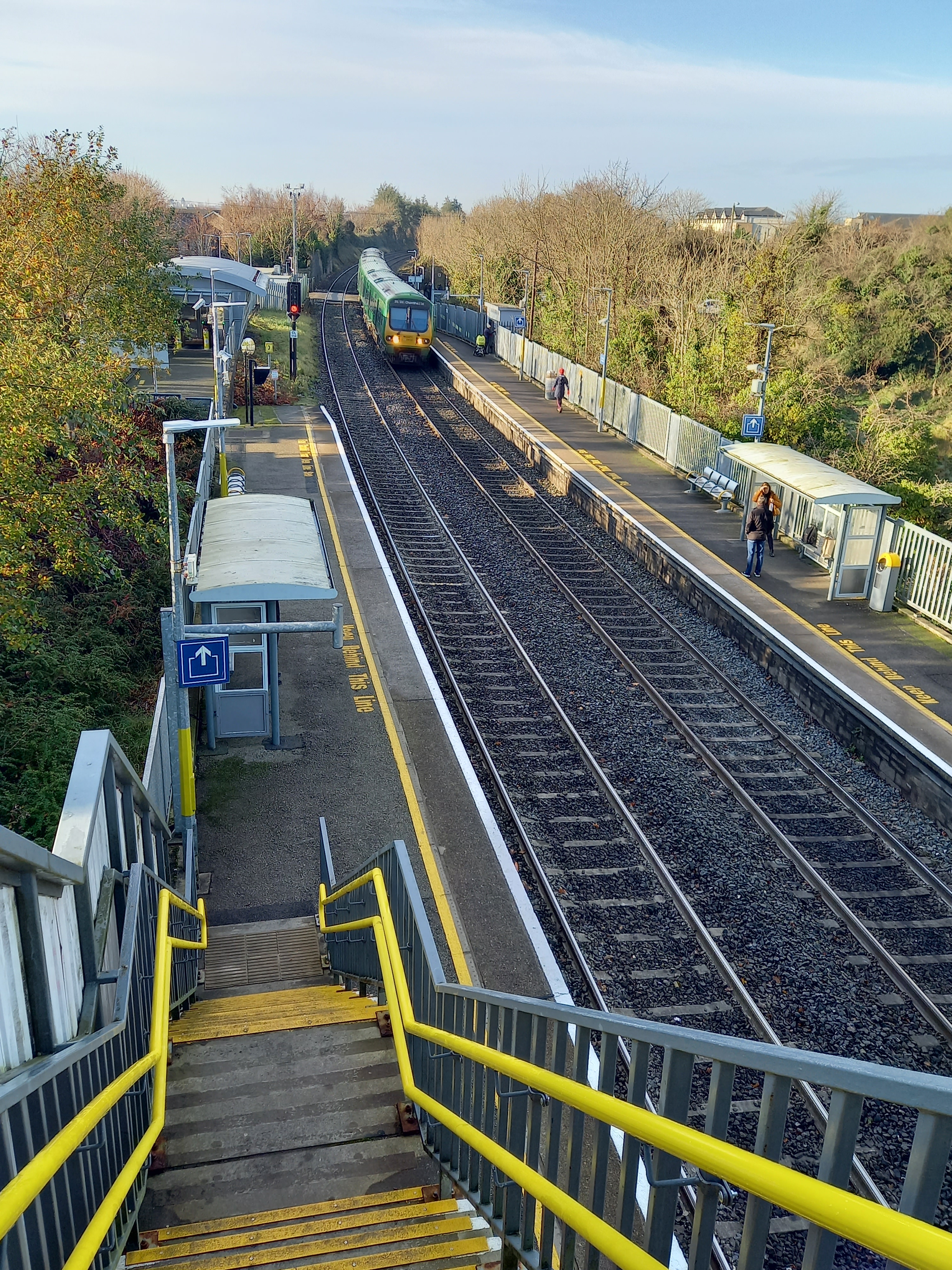
Coolmine railway station and level crossing

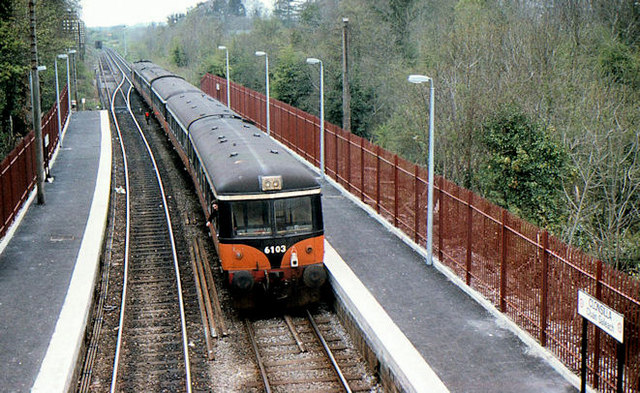
Clonsila railway station

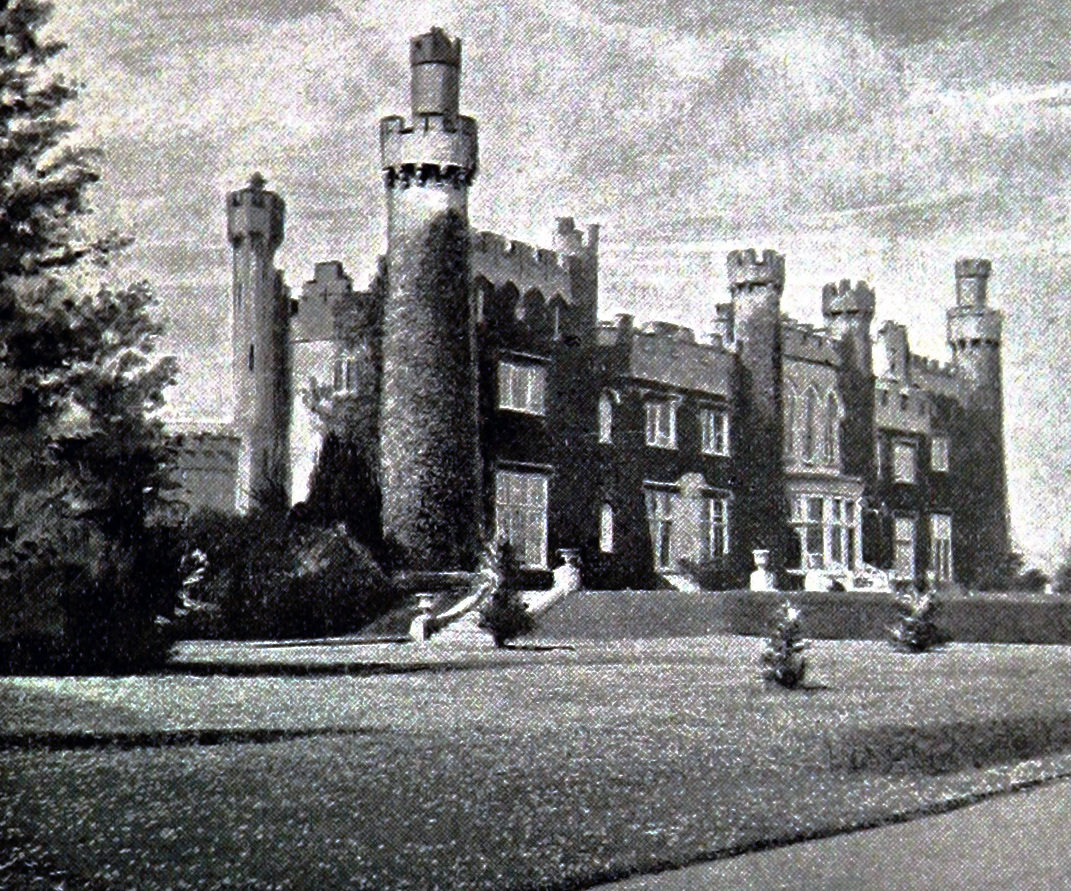
Luttrellstown Castle (1898)

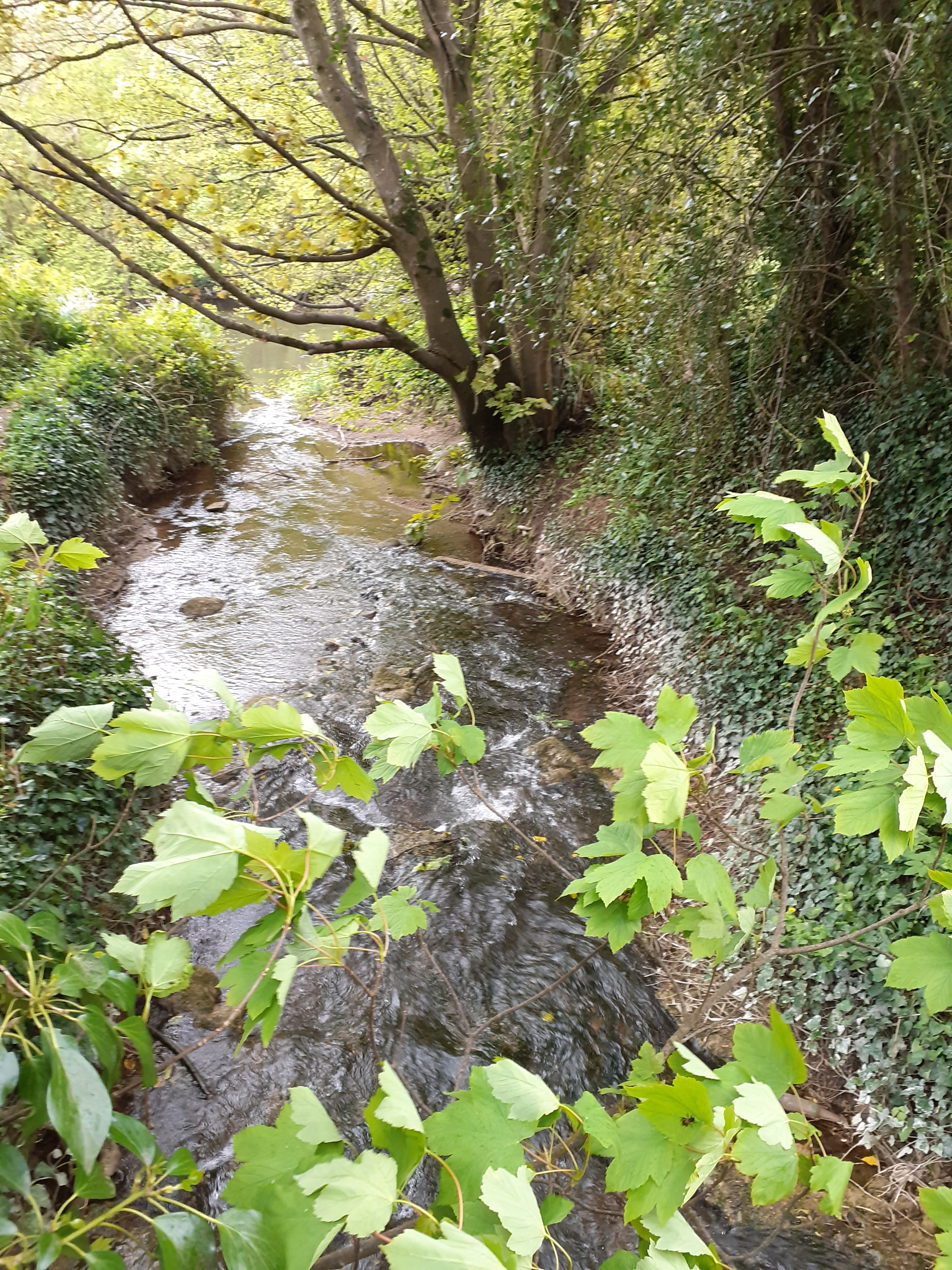
Luttrelstown stream entering the Liffey

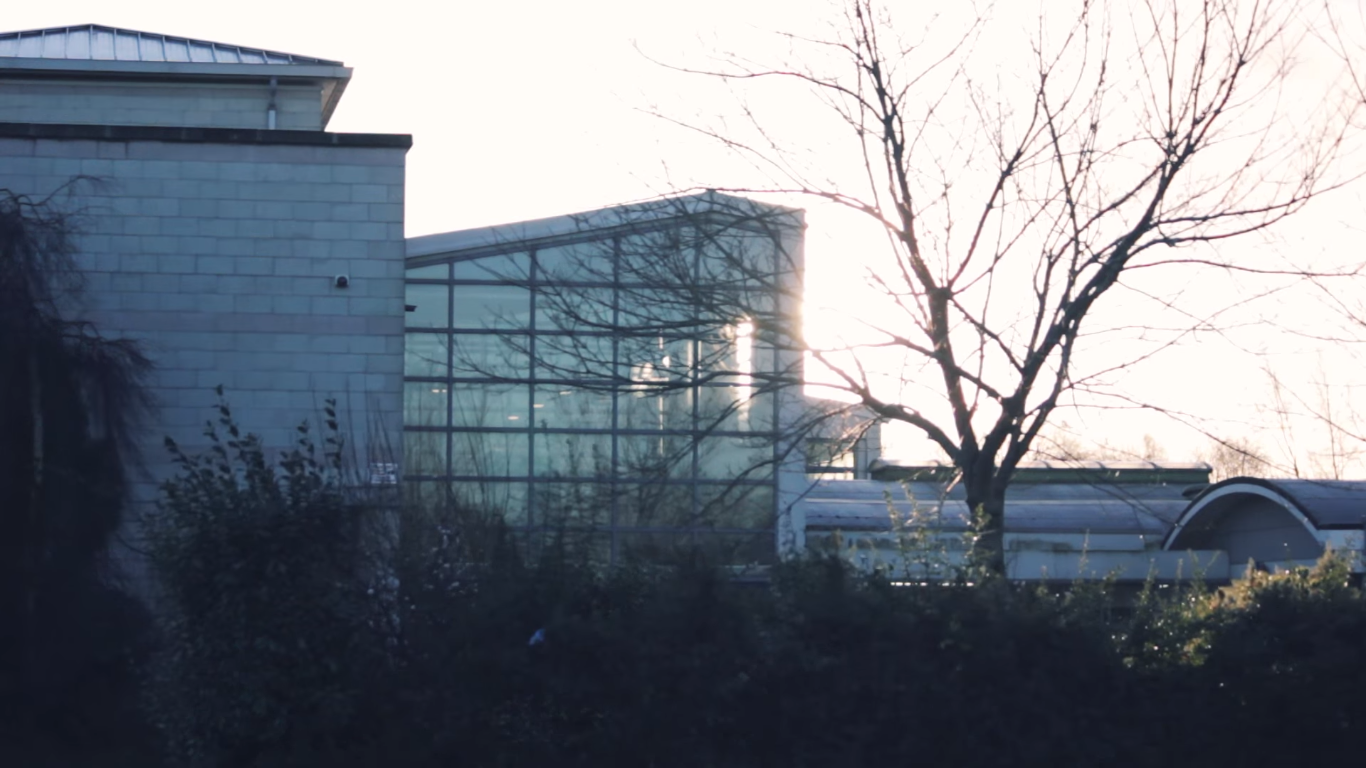
Hartstown Community School

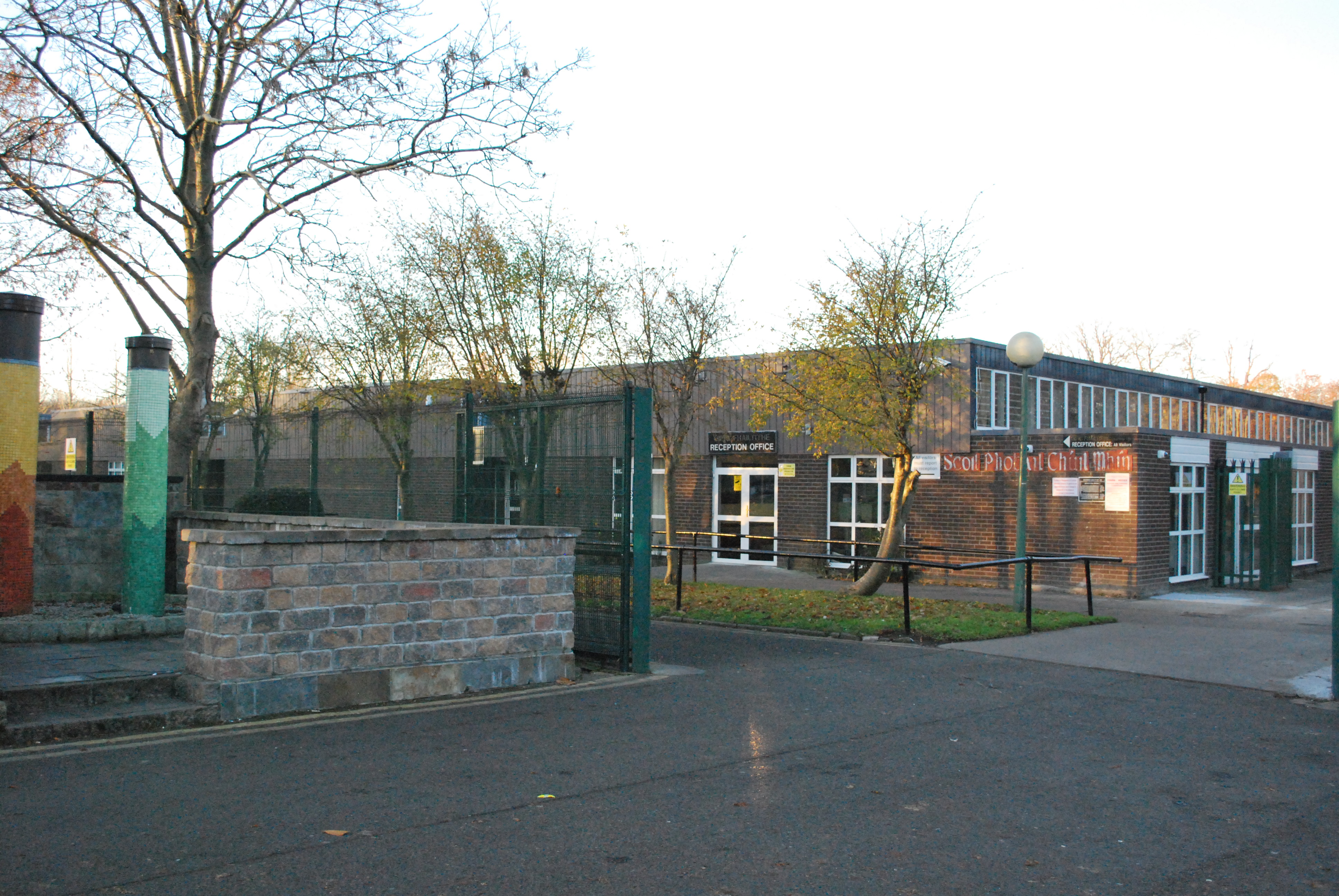
Coolmine Community School

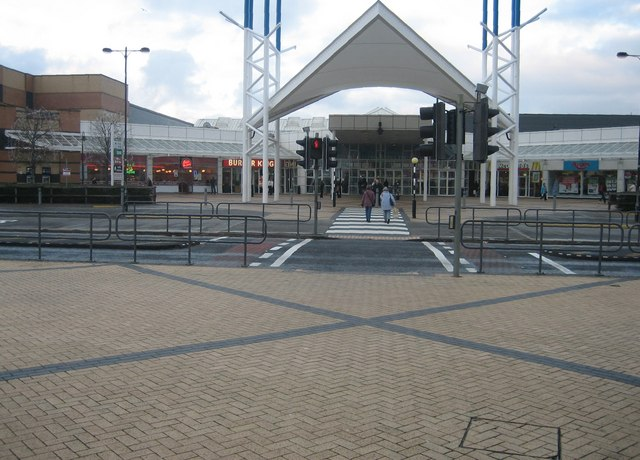
Blanchardstown Shopping Centre
