= Poppy Gilbert =

British actress

- Born: 14 September 1998 (age 28); Stockholm, Sweden
- Education: Lady Eleanor Holles School; Guildhall School of Music & Drama
- Occupation: Actress
- Years active: 2020–present

Poppy Gilbert (born 14 September 1998) is a Swedish-born British actress. On television, she is known for her roles in the Netflix series Stay Close (2021), the BBC One series Chloe (2022) and The Other Bennet Sister (2026), and the 5 series The Catch (2023).

== Early life and education ==
Gilbert was born in Stockholm, Sweden to British parents Nigel and Camilla and moved around between London, Hong Kong, and Singapore growing up due to her parents' work in advertising and television respectively. She has a sister Darcy.

Gilbert attended Lady Eleanor Holles School in Hampton from 2008 to 2015. She participated in a number of school productions. At the age of 17, Gilbert joined the National Youth Theatre, and in 2016, she began her studies at the Guildhall School of Music & Drama, graduating in 2019 with a Bachelor of Arts in Acting.

== Career ==
Gilbert made her television debut in 2020 as Lesley Pike in an episode of Call the Midwife season nine, which she filmed during her final year of drama school. She played Thomasina Tucker in the two-part adaptation of Agatha Christie's The Pale Horse, and as Ginevra de Benci in three episodes of the historical drama Leonardo starring Aidan Turner as Leonardo da Vinci.

At the end of 2021, Gilbert appeared in Harlan Coben's Netflix mystery series Stay Close as the pseudonymous killer Barbie opposite Hyoie O'Grady as Ken. She then starred in the 2022 BBC One psychological thriller Chloe as the title character. Gilbert also appeared as the young Julie Jackson in two episodes of BBC One's Sherwood in June 2022.

Gilbert starred as Abbie in the Channel 5 series The Catch in January 2023, alongside Jason Watkins and Aneurin Barnard.

In 2026, Gilbert portrayed Lizzy Bennet in the BBC period drama spinoff The Other Bennet Sister and starred as Emily in the premiere of the musical Flyby at Southwark Playhouse.

== Acting credits ==
Film & Television

Year	Title	Role	Notes
2020	Call the Midwife	Leslie Pike	1 episode
2020	The Pale Horse	Thomasina Tuckerton	Miniseries; 2 episodes
2020	Midsomer Murders	Kelly Kirk-Lees	Episode: "The Wolf Hunter of Little Worthy"
2021	Leonardo	Ginevra de Benci	3 episodes
2021	Stay Close	Barbie	7 episodes
2022	Chloe	Chloe	6 episodes
2022	Sherwood	Young Julie Jackson	2 episodes
2023	The Catch	Abbie Collier	Main role - all 4 episodes
2023	Perfect Addiction	Cara	Apple TV film
2023	A Very English Christmas	Harriet	TV Film (Alt name: Christmas in the Cotswolds)
2024	My Week with Maisy	Nurse Lucy	Short film
2024	The Chelsea Detective	Zadie Evans	Season 3 episode 1: Everybody Loves Chloe
2025	My Oxford Year	Cecelia Knowles	Netflix film
2026	The Other Bennet Sister	Elizabeth Darcy (née Bennet)	5 episodes
2027	The Cadburys	Elizabeth Adlington	

Theatre

Year	Title	Role	Venue
2024	Othello	Desdemona	Shakespeare's Globe
2024	Wedding Band: A Love/Hate Story in Black and White	Annabelle	Lyric Hammersmith Theatre
2026	Flyby	Emily	Southwark Playhouse
