= Aneurin Barnard =

Welsh actor (born 1987)

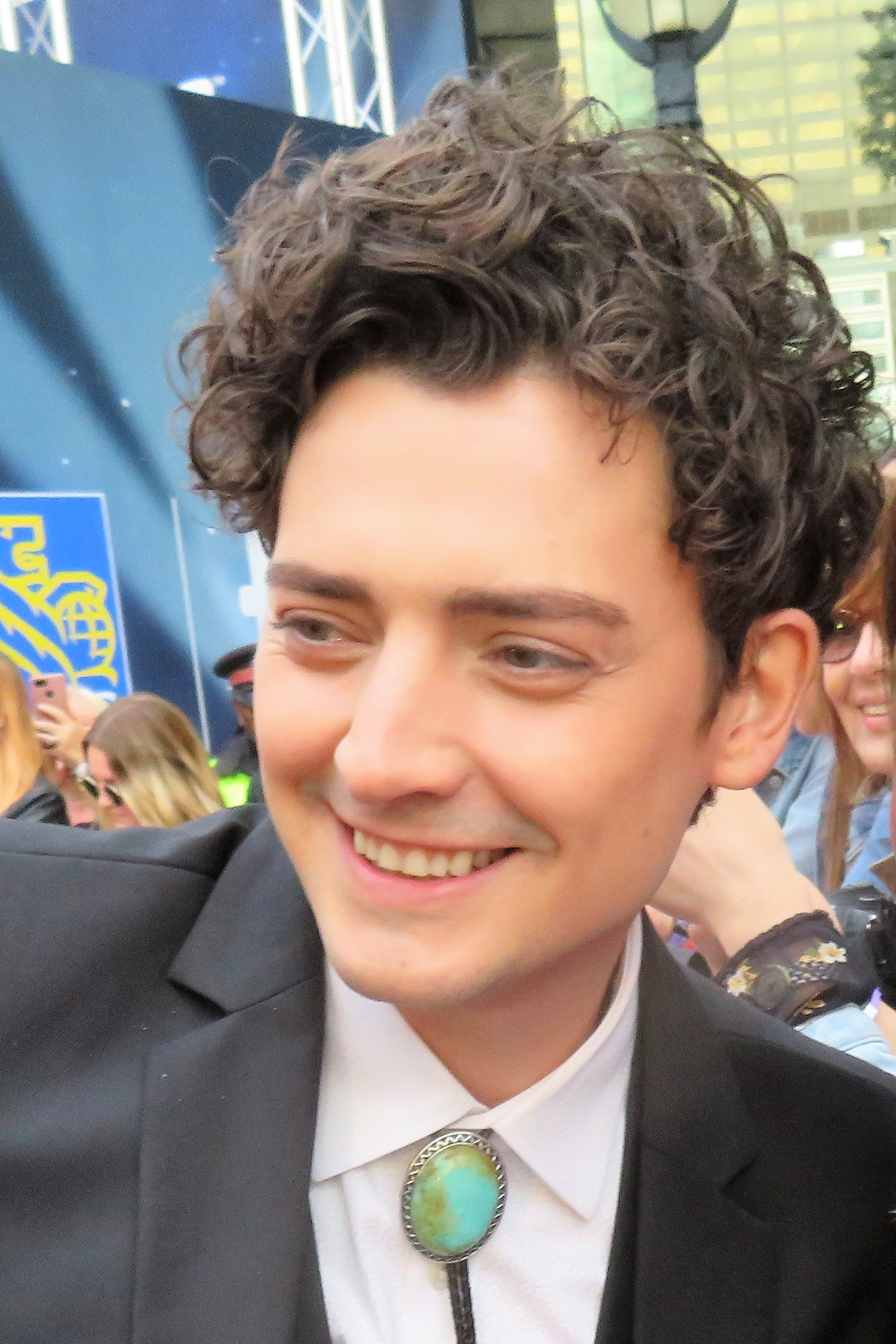
- Barnard in 2019
- Born: 1 May 1987 (age 39); Bridgend, Mid Glamorgan, Wales
- Education: Royal Welsh College of Music & Drama
- Occupation: Actor
- Years active: 2003–present
- Spouse: Lucy Faulks (m. 2017)
- Children: 3

Aneurin Barnard (/əˈnaɪrɪn/; Welsh: [aˈnɛirɪn]; born 1 May 1987) is a Welsh actor. He is known for playing Davey in Hunky Dory, Claude in The Truth About Emanuel, Bobby Willis in Cilla, Tim in Thirteen, King Richard III in The White Queen, William in Dead in a Week or Your Money Back, Gibson in Dunkirk, and Boris Pavlikovsky in The Goldfinch.

== Early life ==
Barnard was born in Bridgend in Wales on 1 May 1987, the son of horse therapist June and coal miner Terry Barnard. His first language is Welsh. He speaks three languages: Welsh, English, and French. He attended Ysgol Gyfun Llanhari in Rhondda Cynon Taf during his secondary school years. Barnard's father initially pressured him to become a doctor, but Barnard refused. Against his father's wishes, Barnard trained at the Royal Welsh College of Music & Drama, graduating as salutatorian in 2008, and was credited as a RWCMD Associate Award in 2019.

== Career ==
=== Theatre ===
Barnard was aged five when he began to be involved in the theatre at the Bridgend County Youth Theatre in 1992. Whilst a student at drama school, he appeared in productions of The Caucasian Chalk Circle, Hobson's Choice, The Importance of Being Earnest, Heathers: The Musical, and West Side Story, in which he played Tony. He was also involved in a radio production of Under Milk Wood.

He played Melchior, one of the three leads, in the London premiere of the Tony Award-winning musical Spring Awakening, which opened in February 2009 at the Lyric Hammersmith. The play later transferred to the Novello Theatre in March 2009, running until May 2009. For his performance, Barnard won the Laurence Olivier Award.

=== Screen ===
Barnard starred in the HTV Wales series Jacob's Ladder as a 16-year-old. He has appeared in guest roles in TV series Doctors, Casualty, Shameless, and Y Pris. He has also appeared in the short TV films The Big Day, Night on the Tiles and the BAFTA Cymru-winning Owl Creek Bridge.

In 2011 Barnard starred in Hunky Dory, co-starring with Minnie Driver. Barnard played the role of Davey and in the film sang songs from the era such as David Bowie's "Life on Mars" and The Who's "Love Reign O'er Me".

In January 2012, Barnard starred as photographer David Bailey in the television film We'll Take Manhattan. He also appeared in the 2012 horror film Elfie Hopkins. Barnard then appeared in the lead role in Vertigo Films's Guinea Pigs, a micro-budget horror film about volunteers fighting for their lives after a drug trial goes wrong. Later in 2012 he starred in the horror-thriller film Citadel.

In 2012 Barnard filmed the fantasy adventure film The Adventurer: The Curse of the Midas Box throughout the South West of England, playing the title role of Mariah Mundi alongside Michael Sheen. The film was released in 2014. Barnard also featured in Trap for Cinderella (2013), and as Claude in Francesca Gregorini's drama thriller, The Truth About Emanuel. In 2013 Barnard portrayed King Richard III of England in the television series The White Queen on BBC One. He also appeared as John Trenchard in a two-part Sky TV adaptation of Moonfleet.

In 2016 he starred as Prince Boris Drubetskoy in Andrew Davies's television adaptation of Leo Tolstoy's War and Peace, broadcast on BBC One, for which he was nominated for Best Actor (Yr Actor Gorau). He starred as Tim Hobson, boyfriend of Ivy Moxham, (played by Jodie Comer) in the BBC 5 part drama Thirteen.

In 2017 he appeared in the film Bitter Harvest. He played the music manager Bobby Willis in ITV's 3-part drama Cilla.

Also in 2017, Barnard had the lead role as Wolfgang Amadeus Mozart in Interlude in Prague. The following year, he played William in the British comedy, Dead in a Week or Your Money Back. In 2022 it was announced that Barnard would appear in the fourteenth series of Doctor Who as Roger ap Gwilliam.

In 2021 Barnard starred in the BBC One prison drama Time alongside Sean Bean and Stephen Graham, earning a fifteenth nomination for Best Actor (Yr Actor Gorau).

In January 2023, Barnard starred as Ryan in the Channel 5 series The Catch, alongside Jason Watkins and Poppy Gilbert. In 2023 he was featured as a patient with erectile dysfunction in the BBC television feature Men Up, about the first clinical trials for the drug Viagra that took place in Swansea in 1994.

== Filmography ==
Key
†	Denotes films that have not yet been released

=== Film ===
Year	Title	Role	Notes
2011	Ironclad	Guy the Squire	
2011	Powder	Miguel	
2011	Hunky Dory	Davey	
2012	Citadel	Tommy	
2012	Elfie Hopkins	Dylan Parker	
2012	The Facility	Adam	
2013	The Truth About Emanuel	Claude	
2013	Trap for Cinderella	Jake	
2013	Mary Queen of Scots	Darnley	
2014	The Adventurer: The Curse of the Midas Box	Mariah Mundi	
2017	Bitter Harvest	Mykola	
2017	Interlude in Prague	Wolfgang Amadeus Mozart	
2017	Dunkirk	Gibson	
2018	Bigger	Ben Weider	
2018	Dead in a Week or Your Money Back	William	
2019	The Personal History of David Copperfield	James Steerforth	
2019	The Goldfinch	Boris Pavlikovsky	
2019	Radioactive	Paul Langevin	
2024	Timestalker	Alex	
2025	Mr Burton	Elfed	
2026	ComArts 2: San Juan	Carlos	
2026	Rogue Trooper	19 / Rogue Trooper	
2026	Out There	Bryn	
TBA	Past Life †	Jason Frey	Post-production

=== Television ===
Year	Title	Role	Notes
2003–2004	Jacob's Ladder	Young Jonathan	Television series
2007–2008	Y Pris	Tupac	Television series
2008	Casualty	Damien	Episode: "Hurt"
2009	Doctors	Chas Murdoch	Episode: "Filmflam Thank You Man"
2012	We'll Take Manhattan	David Bailey	Television film
2013	The White Queen	Richard III	10 episodes
2013	Agatha Christie's Marple	Robbie Hayman	Episode: "Endless Night"
2013	Moonfleet	John Trenchard	3 episodes
2014	Under Milk Wood	Drowned	Television film Voice role
2014	Cilla	Robert "Bobby" Willis Jr.	3 episodes
2015	The Scandalous Lady W	Captain George Bisset	Television film
2015	Killing Jesus	James, son of Zebedee	Television film
2016	War & Peace	Boris Drubetskoy	6 episodes
2016	Thirteen	Tim Hobson	5 episodes
2017	SS-GB	PC Jimmy Dunn	2 episodes
2019	Sherwood	Gisbourne	Voice role 10 episodes
2019	Midsomer Murders	Freddie Lamb	Episode: "With Baited Breath"
2020	Barkskins	Hamish Goames	8 episodes
2021	The Pact	Jack Evans	6 episodes
2021	Time	Bernard	Episode: "#1.1"
2022	Peaky Blinders	Doctor Holford	2 episodes
2022	1899	Daniel Solace	8 episodes
2023	The Catch	Ryan	Main role 4 episodes
2023	Steeltown Murders	Joseph Kappen	4 episodes
2023	Men Up	Dr Dylan Pearce	Television film
2024	The Way	Dan	3 episodes
2024	Doctor Who	Roger ap Gwilliam	2 episodes

== Awards and nominations ==
Year	Awards	Category	Work	Result	Ref.
2010	2010 Laurence Olivier Awards	Laurence Olivier Award for Best Actor in a Musical	Spring Awakening	Won	
2012	Puchon International Fantastic Film Festival	Best Actor	Citadel	Won	
2016	BAFTA Cymru	Best Actor (Yr Actor Gorau)	War & Peace	Nominated	
2022	BAFTA Cymru	Best Actor (Yr Actor Gorau)	Time	Nominated	
