= Jade Jordan =

Irish actor and author

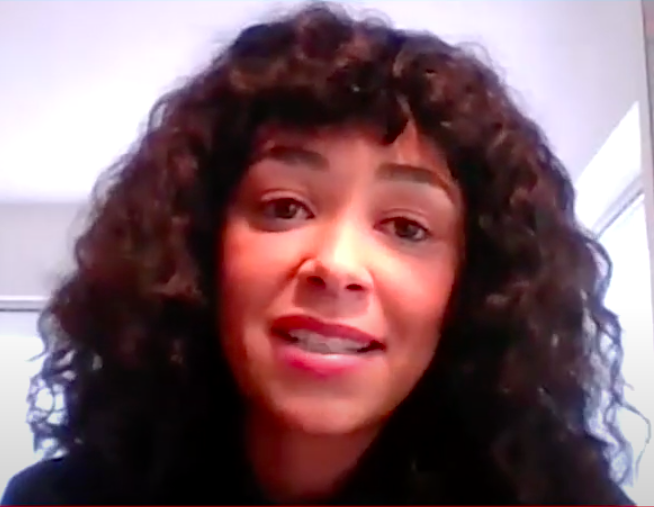
- Jade Jordan in 2022
- Born: Dublin, Ireland
- Occupations: Actor, author
- Years active: 2014–present

Jade Jordan is an Irish actor and writer. She has appeared in film in Rosie (2018), and You Are Not My Mother (2021), and on television in Doctors (2018), The Virtues (2019), Kin (2021), Redemption (2022), and The Catch in 2023. Her first feature film as a screenwriter, The Colour Between, was released in 2021. Her autobiography Nanny, Ma and Me, was published in the same year.

== Early life and education ==
Jade Jordan was born in Dublin and grew up in the Fingal suburb of Blanchardstown with her sister Pariss.

She attended secondary school at Coolmine Community School. She then did a course in theatre studies at Coláiste Dhúlaigh College of Further Education.

In 2009, Jordan moved to London for drama school, graduating in 2013. She later trained at Bow Street Academy.

== Career ==
Jordan has performed on stage with Abbey Theatre and the Druid Theatre Company.

In 2021, she produced and wrote her first feature film, The Colour Between. It was funded by Screen Ireland.

In 2023, she appeared in the Channel 5 series The Catch.

== Personal life ==
Jordan's 2021 autobiography Nanny, Ma and Me, published in 2021, describes her experiences as a Black Irish woman and tells the stories of her grandmother, Kathleen, and her mother, Dominique. Kathleen, born in 1932, moved from Ireland to London in the 1950s to studying nursing. In 1963, she married Larry, a Jamaican man who moved to England as part of the Windrush generation. The couple had three children, including Dominique, and lived in Walthamstow. The family returned to Dublin in 1978, first living in a tenement building on Seán McDermott Street before moving to Blanchardstown in the 1980s.

== Filmography ==
=== Film ===
Year	Title	Role	Notes
2014	Lucifer's Night	Bethany	
2018	Rosie	Megan	
2020	Ascending Grace	Sarah	Short film
2021	Foxglove	Robin	Short film
2021	The Colour Between	Annalise	Short film; also writer and producer
2021	You Are Not My Mother	Ms. Devlin	
2021	X Marks the Spot	Emer	Short film

=== Television ===
Year	Title	Role	Notes
2018	Doctors	Jen Hawkins	Episode: "Worry Dolls"
2019	The Virtues	Doctor	1 episode
2021	Kin	Nellie Akanji	1 episode
2022	No Return	Tara Fisher	2 episodes
2022	Redemption	Debbie Gleeson	
2023	The Catch	Katz	
2024	Blackshore	Donna Walsh	

=== Music videos ===
Song	Year	Artist	Notes
"Waiting to Breathe"	2021	Elaine Mai	

== Stage ==
Year	Title	Role	Notes
2019	Citysong		Abbey Theatre, Dublin

== Awards and nominations ==
Year	Award	Category	Work	Result	Ref
2021	Irish Film London	Súil Eile Award		Won	
2021	Irish Book Awards	Audience Choice Award	Nanny, Ma and Me	Shortlisted	
2022	Dublin International Film Festival	Discovery Award	The Colour Between	Nominated	
2022	IFTA Awards	Best Short Film	The Colour Between	Nominated	(Note: Shared with Dave Tynan.)
