= Daniel Francis (actor) =

British actor (born 1983)

- Born: Daniel Asher Francis; 9 February 1983 (age 43); Battersea, London, England
- Education: London Academy of Music and Dramatic Art
- Occupation: Actor
- Years active: 2002–2003; 2007–present

Daniel Asher Francis (9 February 1983) is an English actor. He began his career in theatre. On television, he is known for his roles in Steve McQueen's Small Axe: Education (2020), and the Netflix miniseries Stay Close (2021) and period drama Bridgerton (2024–).

== Early life and education ==
Francis was born to Jamaican parents and raised by his mother on a council estate in Battersea, South London. Having been shy growing up, he discovered acting through Pyramid Youth in Clapham. When he was seventeen, under the mentorship of theatre director Sacha Wares, Francis was cast in Bintou at the Arcola Theatre. He went on to train at the London Academy of Music and Dramatic Art (LAMDA).

== Career ==
Upon graduating from LAMDA, Francis landed small roles in the Royal Shakespeare Company productions of The Comedy of Errors in Salford and Twelfth Night in Stratford-upon-Avon. He went on to star in The Brothers Size at the Young Vic, the stage adaptation of The Hounding of David Oluwale as the titular David Oluwale, and Off the Endz at the Royal Court Theatre.

Francis landed his first major onscreen role as Sgt Carl Haleford in the 2012 ITV war drama Homefront. That same year, he made his feature film debut as Sean Warren in the sports drama Fast Girls and played Black in Blackta, returning to the Young Vic. The following year, he played the titular role in the Singapore Repertory Theatre production of Othello.

In 2016, Francis played Martin Luther King Jr. in Katori Hall's The Mountaintop at the New Vic Theatre in Staffordshire. He joined the recurring cast of Once Upon a Time for its seventh and final season as Dr. Facilier or Baron Samdi.

In the meantime, Francis has worked as a personal development coach and consultant, and as a community manager for Hedera Hashgraph.

Francis played Esmond Smith in the Education installment of Steve McQueen's Small Axe anthology, which premiered in 2020. He also starred in Cops at Southwark Playhouse. He was then cast in Harlen Coben's 2021 Netflix mystery miniseries Stay Close as Dave Shaw.

Francis starred in the Apple TV+ series Liaison, the second season of the Amazon Prime adaptation of The Wheel of Time, and currently co-stars on the Netflix period drama Bridgerton.

== Filmography ==
=== Film ===
Year	Title	Role	Notes
2011	The Shot		Short film
2012	Fast Girls	Sean Warren	
2016	In and Out	Josh	Short film
2017	Cla'am	Low Beak	Short film
2024	Don't Move	Dontrell	Film

=== Television ===
Year	Title	Role	Notes
2003	EastEnders	Pete	1 episode
2003	Trail of Guilt	Nathaniel	Docuseries; episode: "To Catch the Carjackers"
2010	Law & Order: UK	Louis Francis	Episode: "Broken"
2012	Eternal Law	Captain Caple	1 episode
2012	Homefront	Sgt Carl Haleford	Miniseries
2013	Holby City	Joey Ryan	Episode: "Arthur's Theme"
2017–2018	Once Upon a Time	Dr. Facilier / Baron Samdi	8 episodes
2020	Small Axe	Esmond Smith	Anthology; episode: Education
2021	Stay Close	Dave Shaw	Miniseries
2023	Liaison	Albert Onwori	6 episodes
2023	The Wheel of Time	Turak	2 episodes
2024-present	Bridgerton	Marcus Anderson	11 episodes

== Stage ==
Year	Title	Role	Notes
2002	Bintou		Arcola Theatre, London
2007	The Comedy of Errors	Antiopholus (understudy) / Merchant	The Lowry, Salford
2007	Twelfth Night	Lord / Sailor	Courtyard Theatre, Stratford-upon-Avon
2008	The Brothers Size	Ogun	Young Vic, London
2009	The Hounding of David Oluwale	David Oluwale	England tour
2010	Off the Endz	Kojo	Royal Court Theatre, London
2012	Blackta	Black	Young Vic, London
2013	Othello	Othello	Singapore Repertory Theatre, Singapore
2016	The Mountaintop	Martin Luther King Jr.	New Vic Theatre, Newcastle-under-Lyme
2020	Cops	Roosevelt "Rosey" Washington	Southwark Playhouse, London
