= Stay Close =

2021 British crime drama series

- Also known as: Harlan Coben's Stay Close
- Genre: Crime drama; Mystery-thriller
- Based on: Stay Close by Harlan Coben
- Written by: Danny Brocklehurst; Mick Ford; Charlotte Coben; Victoria Asare-Archer
- Directed by: Daniel O'Hara
- Starring: Cush Jumbo; James Nesbitt; Richard Armitage; Sarah Parish; Jo Joyner; Youssef Kerkour; Daniel Francis; Bethany Antonia; Eddie Izzard; Connor Calland; Belinda Stewart-Wilson; Rod Hunt; Alibe Parsons; Poppy Gilbert; Hyoie O'Grady; Ross Boatman; Lindsay Armaou; Leon Annor
- Composers: David Buckley; Luke Richards
- Country of origin: United Kingdom
- Original language: English
- No. of episodes: 8

Production
- Executive producers: Danny Brocklehurst; Harlan Coben; Nicola Shindler; Richard Fee
- Producer: Juliet Charlesworth
- Cinematography: Giulio Biccari
- Production company: Red Production Company

Original release
- Network: Netflix
- Release: 31 December 2021

Stay Close (also known as Harlan Coben's Stay Close) is a British mystery drama television series based on the 2012 Harlan Coben novel of the same title, produced by Red Production Company for Netflix. The eight-episode series stars Cush Jumbo, James Nesbitt, Richard Armitage, and Sarah Parish. It was released on 31 December 2021.

== Plot ==
Megan Pierce is a suburban mum living in the fictional suburb of Blackpool, hiding a murky past. She has found her soulmate in Dave, and they have three great children. Ray Levine was once a talented documentary photographer. Losing the woman, Cassie he loved changed him. Now he is in a dead-end job, playing a paparazzo-for-hire, pandering to rich kid pseudo-celebrities. Michael Broome is a detective still haunted by a cold case from years ago, when local husband and father Stewart Green disappeared without any trace. Green's wife, Sarah Green still waits for Stewart to return.

When another man, Carlton Flynn (Connor Calland) goes missing on the anniversary of Stewart's disappearance, Broome takes the case in the hope of exorcising his demons. Lives are in danger of being ruined, and relationships splintered, as Broome's investigations open old wounds, stir up memories, and threaten to expose the truth. Weaving their way through the spaces of what binds these three lives together are a couple of colourful psychopaths, intent on completing their own agenda.

== Cast and characters ==
=== Main ===
- Cush Jumbo as Megan Pierce / Cassie Morris, a former exotic dancer, now engaged with three children
- James Nesbitt as DS Michael Broome, a jaded police sergeant
- Richard Armitage as Ray Levine, a photographer
- Sarah Parish as Lorraine Griggs, the owner of Vipers, a night club

=== Recurring ===
- Jo Joyner as DC Erin Cartwright, Broome's police partner and ex-wife
- Youssef Kerkour as Fester, Ray's friend
- Daniel Francis as Dave Shaw, Megan's fiancé
- Bethany Antonia as Kayleigh Shaw, oldest child of Dave and Megan
- Eddie Izzard as Harry Sutton, a lawyer
- Connor Calland as Carlton Flynn
- Belinda Stewart-Wilson as Sarah Green
- Rod Hunt as Stewart Green
- Alibe Parsons as Frances Shaw, Dave's mother
- Poppy Gilbert as "Barbie"
- Hyoie O'Grady as "Ken"
- Ross Boatman as Del Flynn
- Lindsay Armaou as Marlene Flynn
- Leon Annor as Jamal
- Dylan Francis as Jordan Shaw, youngest child of Dave and Megan
- Tallulah Byrne as Laura Shaw, middle child of Dave and Megan
- Rachel Andrews as Bea, Kayleigh's best friend
- Andi Osho as Simona Farr, Ray's friend
- Jack Shalloo as DCS Brian Goldberg, Broome's superior

== Background ==
In August 2018, American writer Harlan Coben signed a five-year deal with Netflix. Under the deal, Coben would have 14 of his novels adapted as Netflix series, with him serving as producer on all of them. Stay Close follows other Coben-created Netflix originals Safe (2018), The Stranger, The Woods (both 2020), The Innocent, and Gone for Good (both 2021).

It's such a pleasure to be setting off on another thrill-ride with Harlan [Coben], Danny [Brocklehurst] and Nicola [Shindler], as we dive into a brand new story about people who keep shocking secrets from their families and closest friends. We're excited to have the opportunity again to hook Netflix viewers around the world with a compelling mystery that will keep people up late into the night.

— Richard Fee, executive producer, Red Production Company

== Episodes ==
No.	Title	Directed by	Written by	Original release date
1	"Episode 1"	Daniel O'Hara	Danny Brocklehurst	31 December 2021
2	"Episode 2"	Daniel O'Hara	Mick Ford	31 December 2021
3	"Episode 3"	Daniel O'Hara	Mick Ford	31 December 2021
4	"Episode 4"	Lindy Heymann	Charlotte Coben	31 December 2021
5	"Episode 5"	Lindy Heymann	Victoria Asare-Archer	31 December 2021
6	"Episode 6"	Lindy Heymann	Danny Brocklehurst & Charlotte Coben	31 December 2021
7	"Episode 7"	Lindy Heymann	Victoria Asare-Archer	31 December 2021
8	"Episode 8"	Daniel O'Hara	Danny Brocklehurst	31 December 2021

== Production ==
=== Development ===
The series, comprising eight episodes, was announced by Netflix in October 2020. At the time, Danny Brocklehurst was announced as head writer for the series with Daniel O'Hara as lead Director.

=== Casting ===
The main cast were revealed to be Cush Jumbo, James Nesbitt, Richard Armitage and Sarah Parish. In February 2021, Netflix announced that several new people would be joining the cast, including Eddie Izzard, Andi Osho, Daniel Francis, Jo Joyner, Bethany Antonia and Rachel Andrews.

=== Filming ===
Filming of Stay Close began on 18 February 2021 and wrapped on 30 July 2021. The series was filmed in Brinscall, Lancashire, and around Manchester, St Helens, Runcorn, Widnes, Ashton-under-Lyne, Blackpool, Formby, Morecambe and North West England including Runcorn's Silver Jubilee Bridge. Jaume Plensa‘s sculpture Dream was featured heavily.

=== Music ===
The score was composed by David Buckley and Luke Richards.

== Reception ==
The review aggregator website Rotten Tomatoes reported a 92% approval rating with an average rating of 6.2/10, based on 13 critic reviews. Metacritic, which uses a weighted average, assigned a score of 51 out of 100 based on 7 critics, indicating "mixed or average reviews".
