= The Catch (British TV series) =

Family drama series

- Promotional release poster
- Created by: Michael Crompton
- Based on: The Catch by T. M. Logan
- Directed by: Robert Quinn
- Starring: Jason Watkins; Aneurin Barnard; Poppy Gilbert; Cathy Belton; Brenda Fricker
- Country of origin: United Kingdom
- Original language: English
- No. of series: 1
- No. of episodes: 4

Production
- Executive producers: Rachel Gesua; Suzi McIntosh; Herbert Kloiber; David Swetman; Aaron Farrell; Trevor Eve
- Producer: Jyoti Fernandes
- Production location: Ireland
- Running time: 60 minutes

Original release
- Network: Channel 5; My5
- Release: 25 January – 8 February 2023

The Catch is a Channel 5 and My5 four-part drama series set in the west of England, adapted by Michael Crompton from the 2020 novel of the same name by T. M. Logan. Starring Jason Watkins, Aneurin Barnard, Poppy Gilbert and Cathy Belton. The first episode was broadcast on Channel 5 and My5 in the UK on 25 January 2023.

== Plot ==
Local fisherman, Ed Collier struggles to make a decent living because of competing fishermen. Abbie, his daughter, introduces her new boyfriend Ryan, to her parents. Ed is suspicious of Ryan, who is young, handsome, rich and successful. Ed's wife, Claire presumes Ed is being overprotective, understandably, as they lost their son to a boating accident 15 years ago. Ed teams up with Abbie's ex-boyfriend, George to investigate Ryan's history and is startled at what he finds. Ed follows Ryan to the red-light district and films him with a young woman, later he confronts Ryan about it in front of the family. However, Ryan's answer is acceptable, driving Ed's family to turn against him, and things get darker when an ominous threatening message appears painted on the decking of his boat.

== Cast ==
- Jason Watkins as Ed Collier
- Aneurin Barnard as Ryan Wilson
- Poppy Gilbert as Abbie Collier
- Cathy Belton as Claire Collier
- Brenda Fricker as Phyllis Doyle
- Jade Jordan as Katz
- Tracy Wiles as DI Jennie Nott
- Ian Pirie as Bob Chapman
- Morgan Palmeria as George
- Cameron Jack as Craig
- Menyee Lai as Pauline
- Paul Sparkes as Wayne Pendrick
- Jacob Hickey as Josh
- Karl Hogan as Baxter

== Filming ==
The Catch was filmed during the summer of 2022, Robert Quinn was the director. Even though the setting for the drama is the south-west of England, the actual filming took place at Balbriggan and other locations in County Dublin, Ireland. The Colliers' house is said to have been a home of former Irish president, Patrick Hillery.

== Production ==
The production was by Projector Pictures, in association with Night Train Media and All3Media International. Rachel Gesua, Suzi McIntosh and Trevor Eve were executive producers on behalf of Projector Pictures, and Herbert Kloiber was executive producer for Night Train Media.

== Broadcast ==
It was first broadcast on Channel 5 and My5 in the UK on 25 January 2023, broken into four one-hour episodes.
