= Tracy Wiles =

English actress

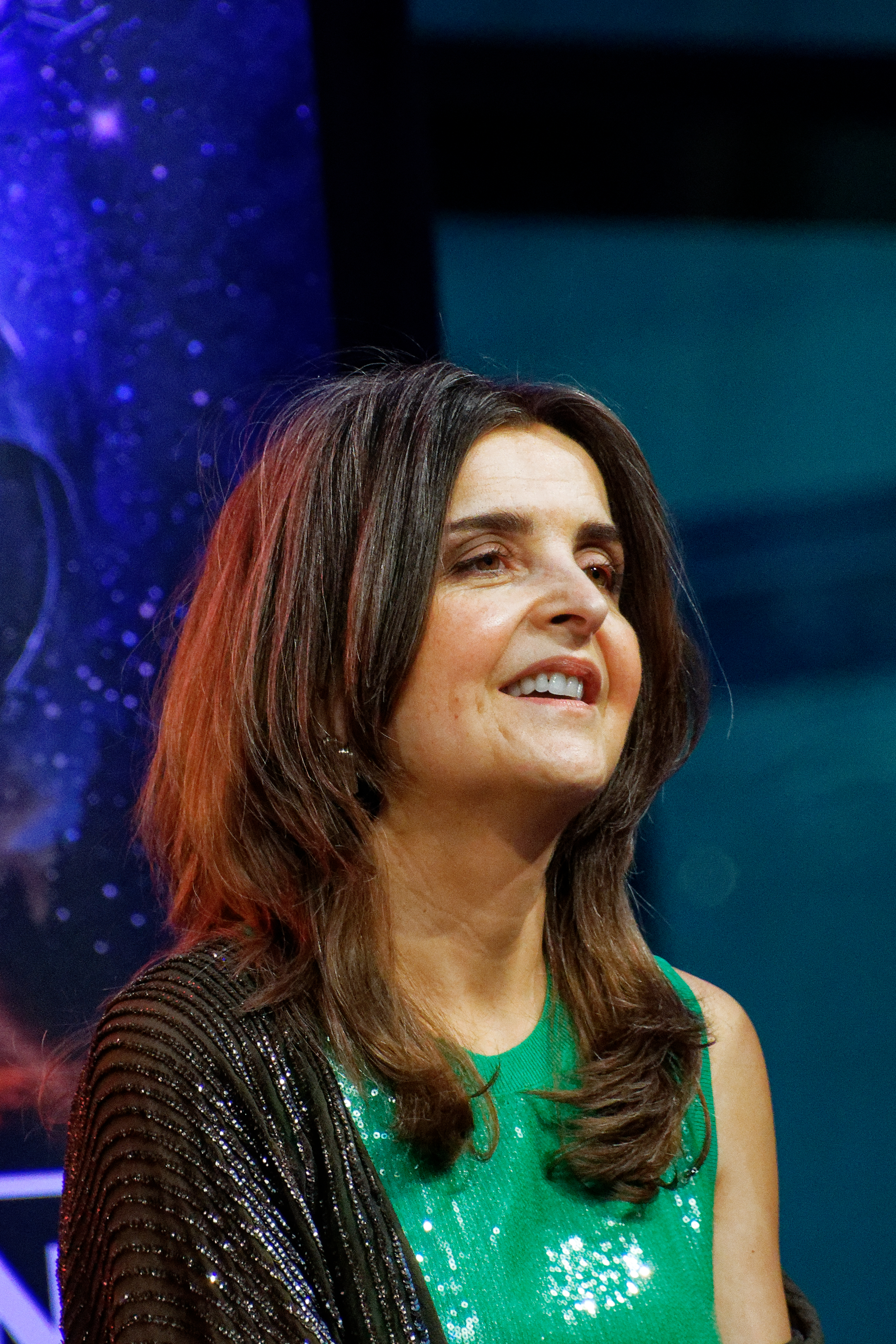
- Wiles at Comic Con, Stuttgart, 2024
- Born: 1970 (age 55–56); Lincolnshire, England
- Other name: Tracey Wiles
- Occupation: Actress
- Years active: 1995–present
- Website: www.tracywiles.com

Tracy Wiles (born c. 1970), also credited as Tracey Wiles, is an English actress, who has worked on radio, stage and TV, and in film. She has appeared in McCallum (1997), Sea of Souls (2004), Doctors (2005–2023), The Line of Beauty (2006), Britz (2007), Holby City (2007–2017), Ashes to Ashes (2008), EastEnders (2011), Le Donne (2015), Manhunt, Shetland and Top Boy (all 2019), and The Catch in 2023. She received a BAFTA Award nomination for her voice work in the fantasy video game Baldur's Gate 3.

== Biography ==
Wiles was born in Lincolnshire, England, but was raised on the Island of Islay. She graduated from the Royal Conservatoire of Scotland in 1995. Film appearances include Samaria Intrigo, Wild Rose, Bronson, Swinging with the Finkels and the short film Awakening, which won Best Drama at the New York Short Film Festival 2015.

Her television work includes Shetland, Top Boy, Manhunt, Outnumbered, Law & Order, Siblings, EastEnders, Holby City, Ashes to Ashes and Britz. She has won the Carleton Hobbs BBC Radio Drama Award, the James Bridie Gold Medal, and the Hyacinth Havergal Prize. She works extensively in radio, acting in over 300 plays and comedies to date. In 1998, she started a company called Tryarz, which focused on new plays. In 2019, she appeared in an episode of the BBC soap opera Doctors as Judge Siobhan Higgins.

In 2023, Wiles appeared in two episodes of the Channel 5 series The Catch.

== Filmography ==
=== Film ===
Year	Title	Role	Notes
2002	Soapdodgers	Karen	Short film
2008	Bronson	Jewelry Shop Assistant #1	
2011	Knock Off	Mrs. Blackburn	Short film
2011	Swinging with the Finkels	Bondage Women	
2014	Autumn Leaves	Jean	Short film
2015	House of Locks	Katie	Short film
2015	Awakening	Saint Margaret	Short film
2016	Waiting for the Boatman	Marchesa di Colonna	
2017	Black Mountains	Isabelle Noble	Short film
2017	A Cold Day in June	Kate	Short film
2018	The Feast	Milly (voice)	Short film
2018	Wild Rose	Train Passenger	
2019	Meat Is Murder	Julie	Short film
2023	The Statistical Probability of Love at First Sight	Mrs. O'Callaghan	Post-production

=== Television ===
Year	Title	Role	Notes
1997	McCallum	Junior Doctor	Episode: "Sacrifice"
1997, 2005	The Bill	Angela, Ruth Knowles	2 episodes
2003	Promoted to Glory	Mike's Mother	Television film
2004	Sea of Souls	Secretary	2 episodes
2005	All About George	Registrar	1 episode
2005–2023	Doctors	Rachel Hancock, Judge Siobhan Higgins, Pat Craven, Megan Judd, Tanya Veysey, Veronica Little, Frances Crimp	8 episodes
2006	The Line of Beauty	Pressmen	Episode: "The End of the Street"
2007	Britz	Jan Hill	Television film
2007–2017	Holby City	Julie Jeffries, Vicki Maitlis, Sally Sevenoaks	3 episodes
2008	Ashes to Ashes	Street Girl #2	1 episode
2009	Law & Order: UK	Jenny Lee	Episode: "Unloved"
2010	Outnumbered	Mattie	Episode: "The Restaurant"
2011	EastEnders	Catherine Kane	3 episodes
2015	Le Donne	Rita Florio	TV-Mini series 5 episodes
2019	Manhunt	Monica	2 episodes
2019	Shetland	Carla Hayes	2 episodes
2019	Top Boy	Amma's Supervisor	Episode: "Building Bridges"
2023	The Catch	DI Jennie Nott	2 episodes
2023	Good Omens	Elevator Voice	2 episodes
2024	Secret Level	Tiamat (voice)	Episode: "Dungeons & Dragons: The Queen's Cradle"

=== Video games ===
Year	Title	Role	Notes
2000	Chicken Run	Ginger, Bunty	
2011	Harry Potter and the Deathly Hallows: Part I	Announcers, Witch	
2014	Divinity: Original Sin	Additional voices	
2017	Divinity: Original Sin II	Additional voices	
2018	Pillars of Eternity II: Deadfire	Unlucky Ancret	
2023	Diablo IV	Additional voices	
2023	Baldur's Gate 3	Jaheira	
2024	Metaphor: ReFantazio	Joanna Calendula	
2025	Clair Obscur: Expedition 33	the Paintress	
2026	Marathon	Nona	

=== Radio ===
Year	Title	Writer	Role	Notes
1995	Super Lily and the City of Strangers	Mette Bolstad	Lily Stray	Radio 4
1995	At Bertram's Hotel	Agatha Christie	Elvira Blake	Radio 4
1996	Gracie	Eric Pringle	Gracie Fields	Saturday Playhouse, Radio 4
1996	His Masterpiece	Emile Zola		Classic Serial, Radio 4
1997	The Tin Drum	Gunter Grass	Maria	
1997	Body Politic	Mark Riblin		Thursday Afternoon Play, Radio 4
1998	My Gaiety Girls			Radio 4
1999	Fifty-Four Per Cent Acrylic	David Harrower		The Friday Play, Radio 4
2015–2022	Unit: The New Series		Jacqui McGee	Produced by Big Finish Productions as a spin-off of Doctor Who

=== Stage ===
Year	Title	Author	Theatre	Role	Director
1996	The Trick is to Keep Breathing	Michael Boyd (script); Janice Galloway (novel)	Royal Court Theatre, London	Joy Stone, 3rd persona	Michael Boyd
1997	Captain of the Birds	Edward Carey	The Young Vic, London	Rose	Louise Stafford Charles
1997	Crazy Horse	Parv Bancil	Battersea Arts Centre, London	English girl	Vicky Featherstone
1998	Merrily We Roll Along	Stephen Sondheim & George Furth	Prince Theatre, London	Mary Flynn	Nick Bligh
1999	Hansel and Gretel		Octagon Theatre, Bolton	Banshee, the Wicked Stepmother, and La Stregamama	Mark Babych

== Awards and nominations ==
Year	Award	Category	Nominated work	Result	Ref.
2024	British Academy Games Awards	Performer in a Supporting Role	Baldur's Gate 3	Nominated	
