= The Cadburys =

British television series

- Based on: Chocolate Wars by Dorothy Cadbury
- Screenplay by: Mi Lin Ewart; Eve Hedderwick Turner; Karim Khan
- Directed by: Tom McKay; Jill Robertson
- Starring: Toby Regbo; Harry Gilby; Jessica Barden; Mathew Baynton; Joanna Scanlan; Ben Hardy; Poppy Gilbert; Pearce Quigley; Felicity Montagu
- Country of origin: United Kingdom
- Original language: English
- No. of series: 1

Production
- Executive producers: Faye Ward; Claire Londy; Freddie Highmore; Helen Perry; Jess O’Riordan; Jon Farrar
- Producer: Hannah Farrell
- Production companies: Fable Pictures; Alfresco Pictures

Original release
- Network: U BritBox

The Cadburys is an upcoming UKTV historical drama television series. It is expected to air on UKTV and BritBox in 2027.

== Cast ==
- Toby Regbo as Richard Cadbury
- Harry Gilby as George Cadbury
- Jessica Barden as Maria Cadbury
- Mathew Baynton as Joseph Rowntree
- Joanna Scanlan as Dorothy Adlington
- Ben Hardy as Francis Fry
- Poppy Gilbert as Elizabeth Adlington
- Pearce Quigley as John Cadbury
- Felicity Montagu as Mary Brown
- Adam Hashmi as William Singh
- Oli Green as Howard Lloyd
- Alexander Butler as Frank Sheldon

== Production ==
The series is produced by Fable Pictures association with Alfresco Pictures, and inspired by the Deborah Cadbury book Chocolate Wars. Executive producers include Faye Ward, Claire Londy and Freddie Highmore with Helen Perry for UKTV and Jess O’Riordan and Jon Farrar for BritBox. Directors of episodes include Tom McKay and Jill Robertson, with Hannah Farrell from Fable Pictures as series producer. Mi Lin Ewart is the lead writer, alongside Eve Hedderwick Turner and Karim Khan. The series was announced in January 2026 with the working title Chocolate Wars after eight years in development at Fable Pictures.

The cast includes Harry Gilby, Toby Regbo and Jessica Barden as siblings George, Richard and Maria Cadbury with Pearce Quigley as their father John, and founder of the Cadbury company. The cast also includes Ben Hardy, Mathew Baynton, Joanna Scanlan, Poppy Gilbert, Felicity Montagu, Adam Hashmi, Oli Green and Alexander Butler.

Filming locations included Birmingham and Stafford, with filming completed by October 2026.

== Release ==
The Cadburys is set to stream on U and BritBox in 2027.
