= Coolmine =

Suburb of Dublin, Ireland

Coolmine Cúil Mhín
- Suburb
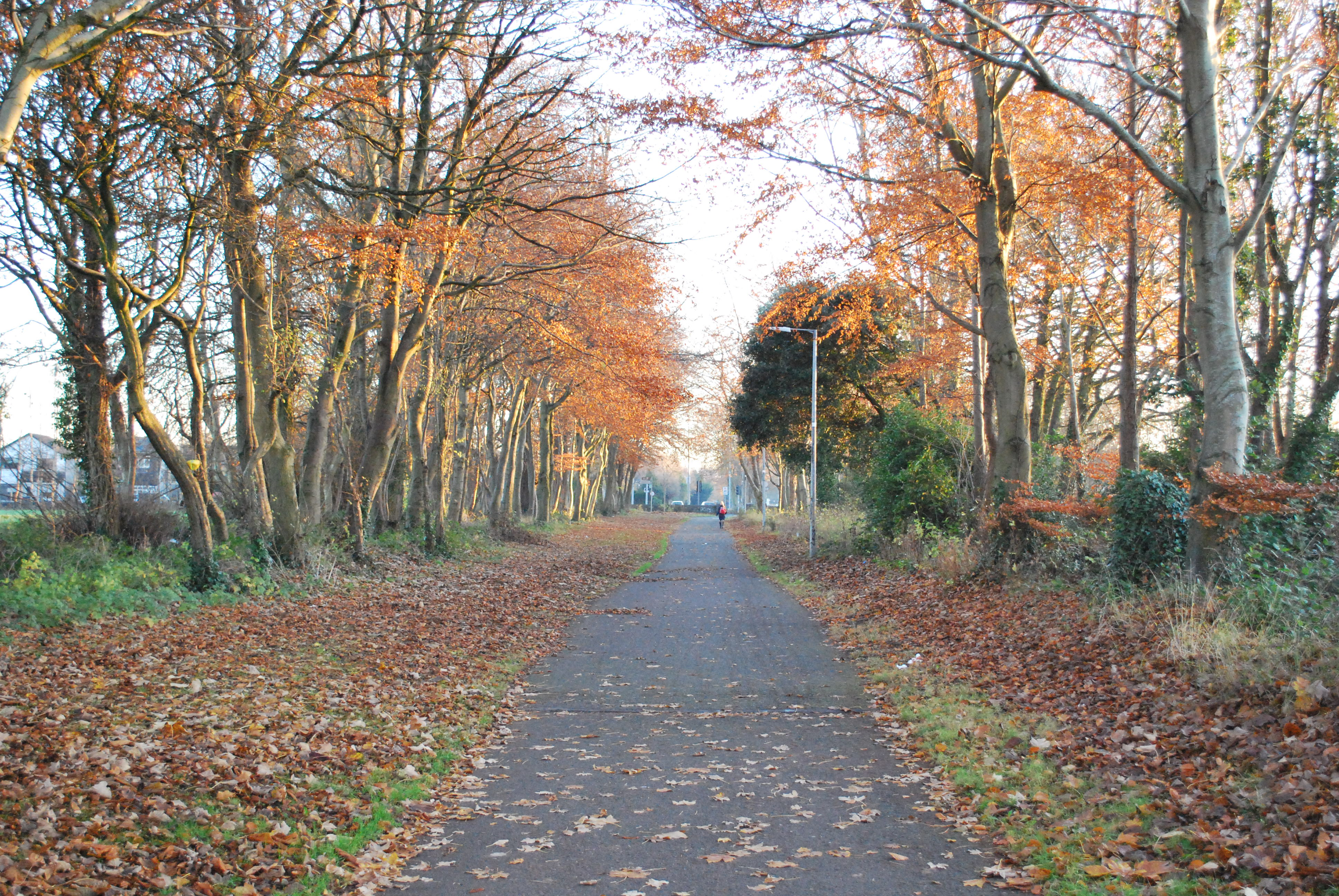
- Coolmine woods

- Location in Dublin
- Coordinates: 53.3844°N 6.3944°W
- Country: Ireland
- Province: Leinster
- County: County Dublin
- Local authority: Fingal County Council

Coolmine (Irish: Cúil Mhín, meaning 'smooth corner') is a primarily residential suburb of Dublin, Ireland, in the jurisdiction of Fingal. It is also a townland in the civil parish of Clonsilla.

== Location and access ==
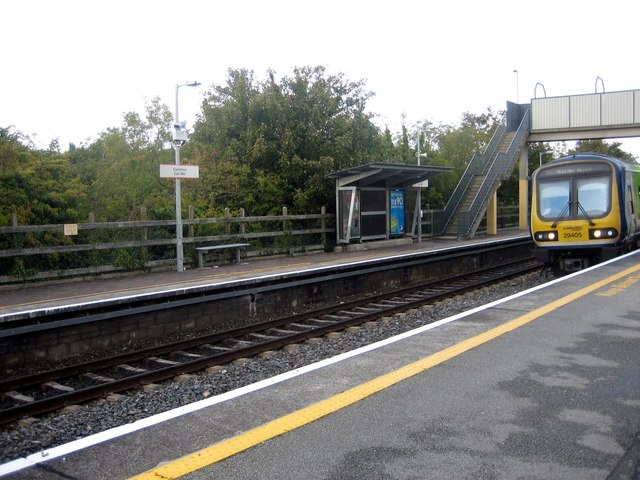
Coolmine railway station

Coolmine is located between the suburban areas of Blanchardstown (to the south-east) and Clonsilla (to the west). It is in the Dublin 15 postal district, approximately 15 kilometres from Dublin city centre. One of the largest shopping outlets in Ireland – the Blanchardstown Centre – is located in Coolmine townland, as well as other parts of greater Blanchardstown.

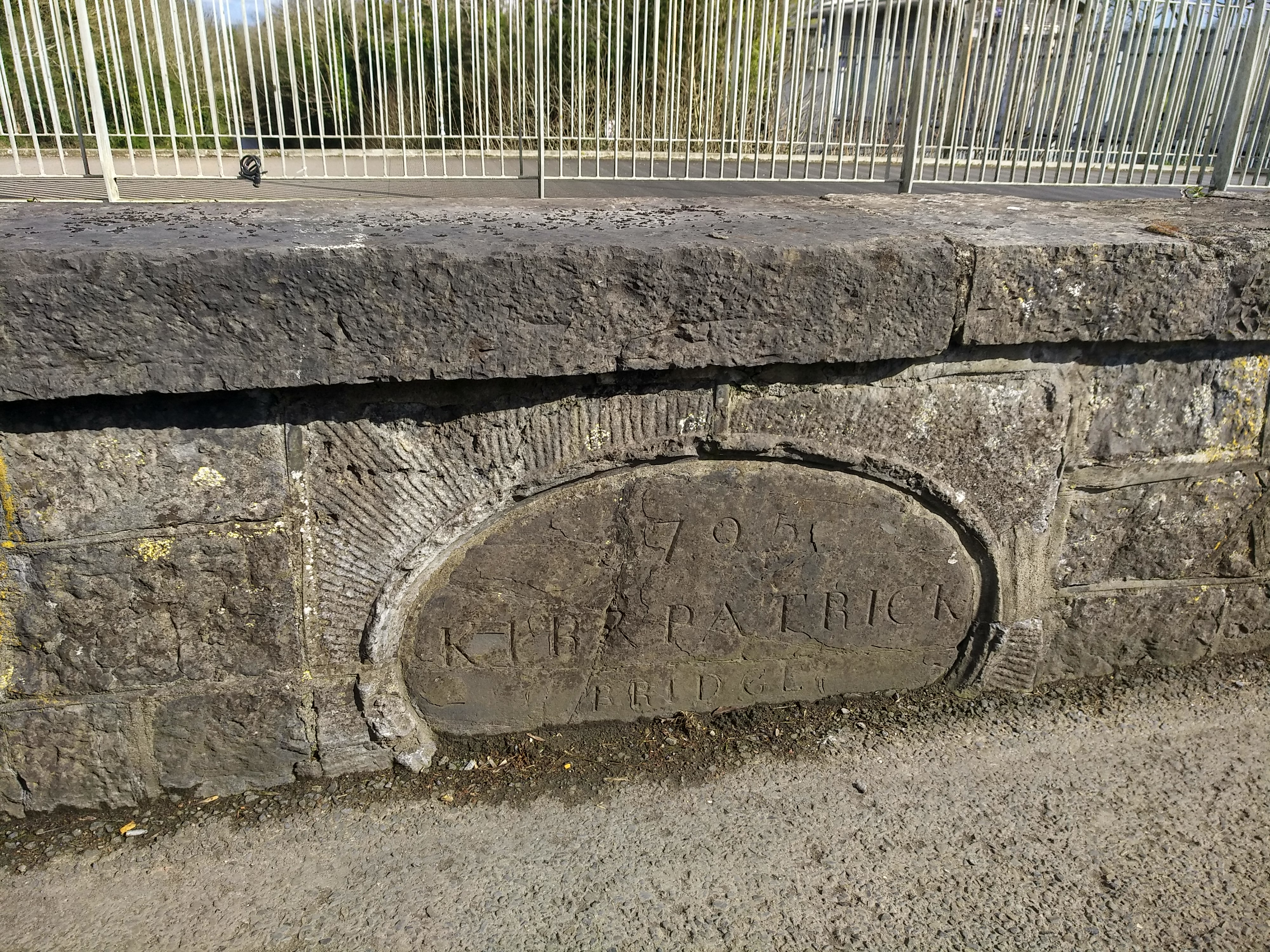
Kirkpatrick Bridge

Public transport in Coolmine is provided by Dublin Bus, with route numbers 37 and 39 serving the area. The N3 Navan Road is the main road artery.

Coolmine railway station is on the Maynooth/M3 Parkway Western Commuter line. The station opened on 2 July 1990. Close to Coolmine railway station is a single-arch stone road bridge (over the Royal Canal) which was built between 1794-1795, with ashlar parapet walls, cut stone keystones and voussoirs.

== Amenities ==
=== Coolmine woods ===
In the centre of Coolmine is the Coolmine woods. Its main path is often used as a shortcut for people heading towards the Blanchardstown Shopping Centre or by schoolchildren attending Coolmine Community School. Its flat and open grass makes it popular for joggers and dog walkers while during the summer, local football teams train on the grass.

=== Millennium Park ===
The Millennium Park is located between Coolmine and the Blanchardstown Shopping Centre. The park is run by Fingal County Council and its amenities include two all-weather astro pitches, a children's playground, a dog pen, a skatepark, and exercise stations.

== Education ==
Schools serving the area include Scoil Oilibhéir (a primary level gaelscoil which opened in 1975) and Coolmine Community School (a secondary level community school with approximately 1000 pupils enrolled).

== Enterprise ==
Coolmine Industrial Estate was opened on 30 May 1983 by Councillor Michael Gannon. The estate is home to a number of businesses and services such as a post office, several small businesses and Blanchardstown Fire Station.

Coolmine is also home to a number of other services such as the Coolmine Community Action Team, which offers drug and alcohol addiction services.

== Gallery ==
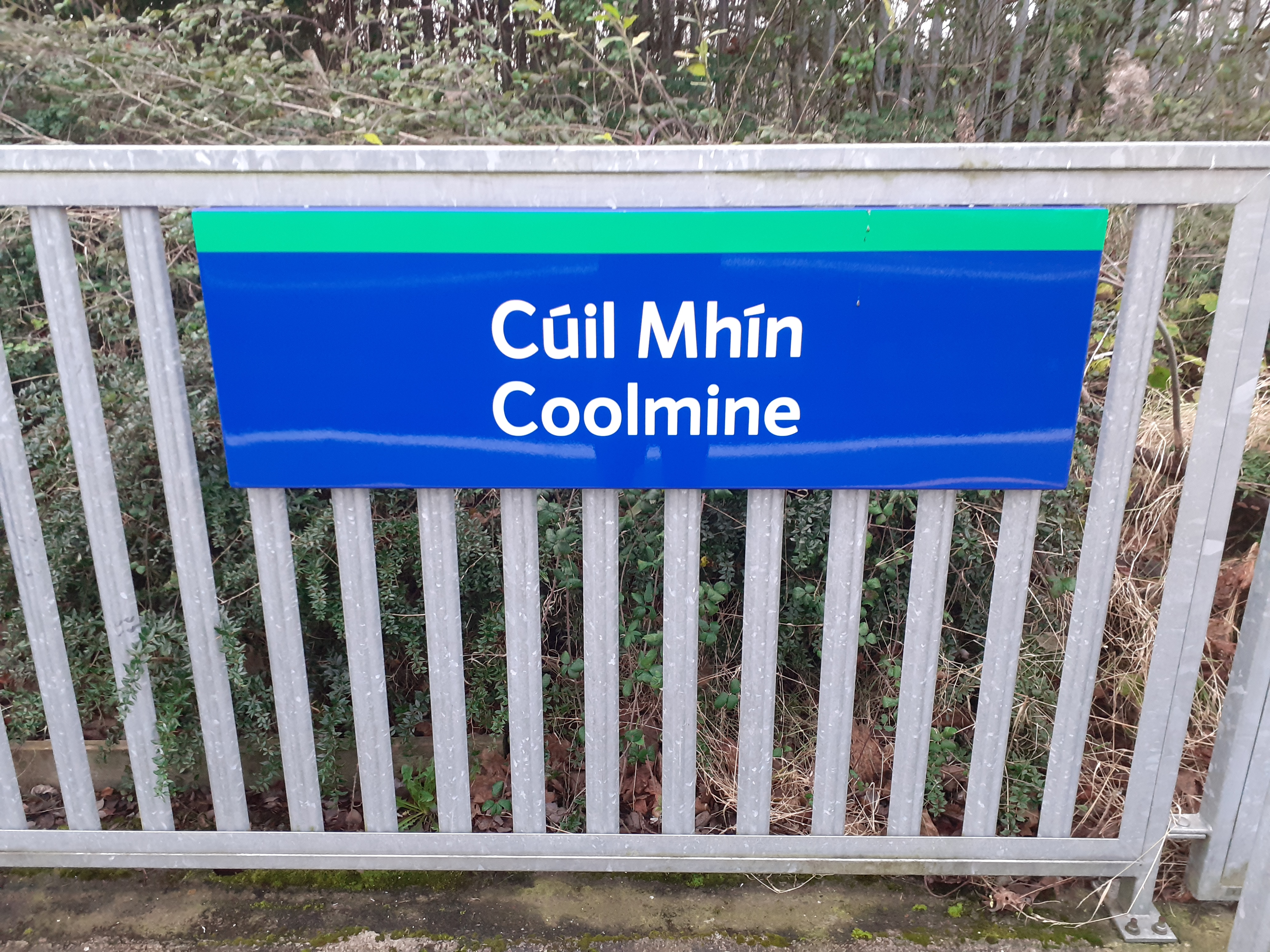
Coolmine train station bilingual sign

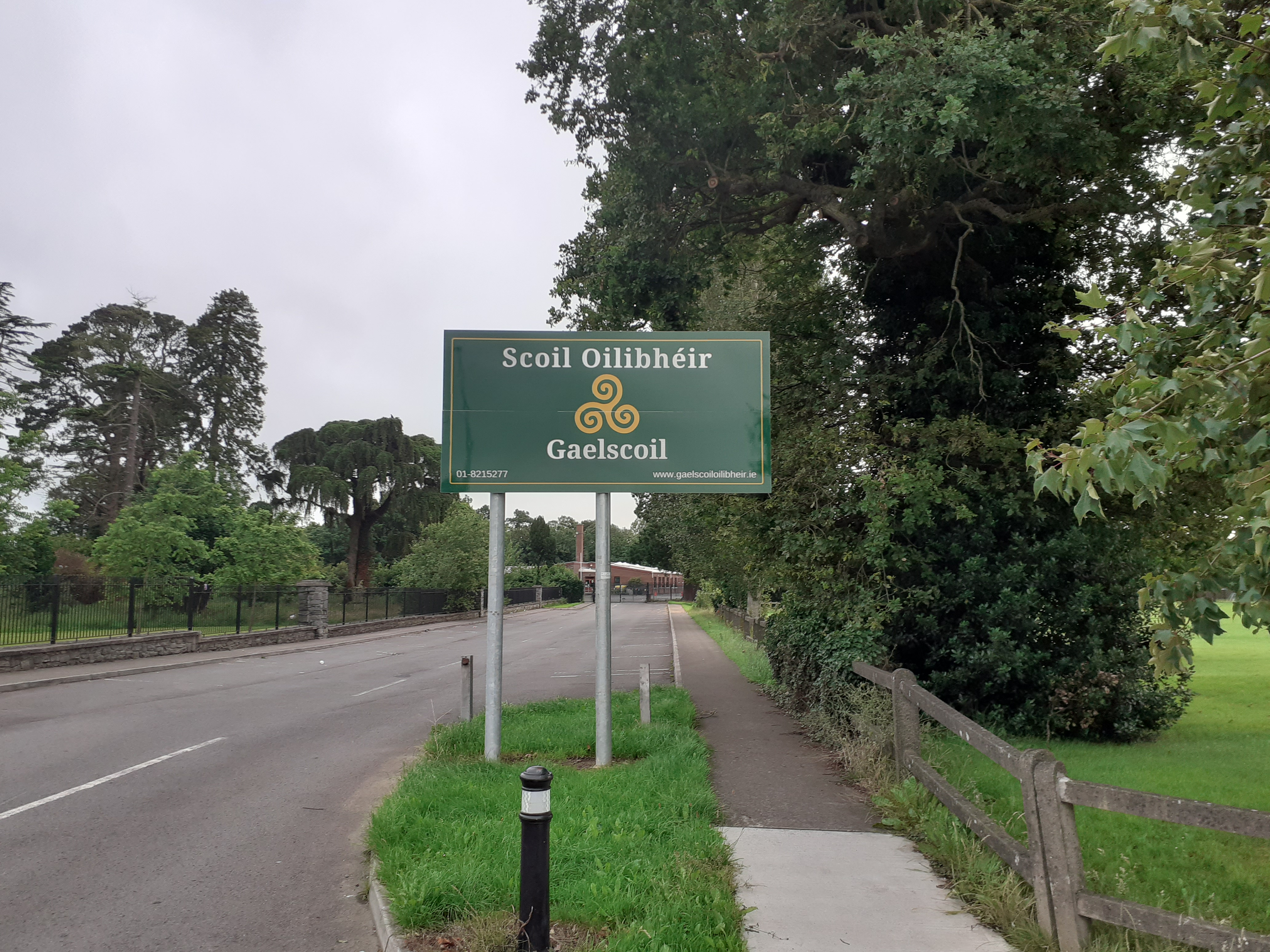
Gaelscoil Scoil Oilibhéir sign, Coolmine

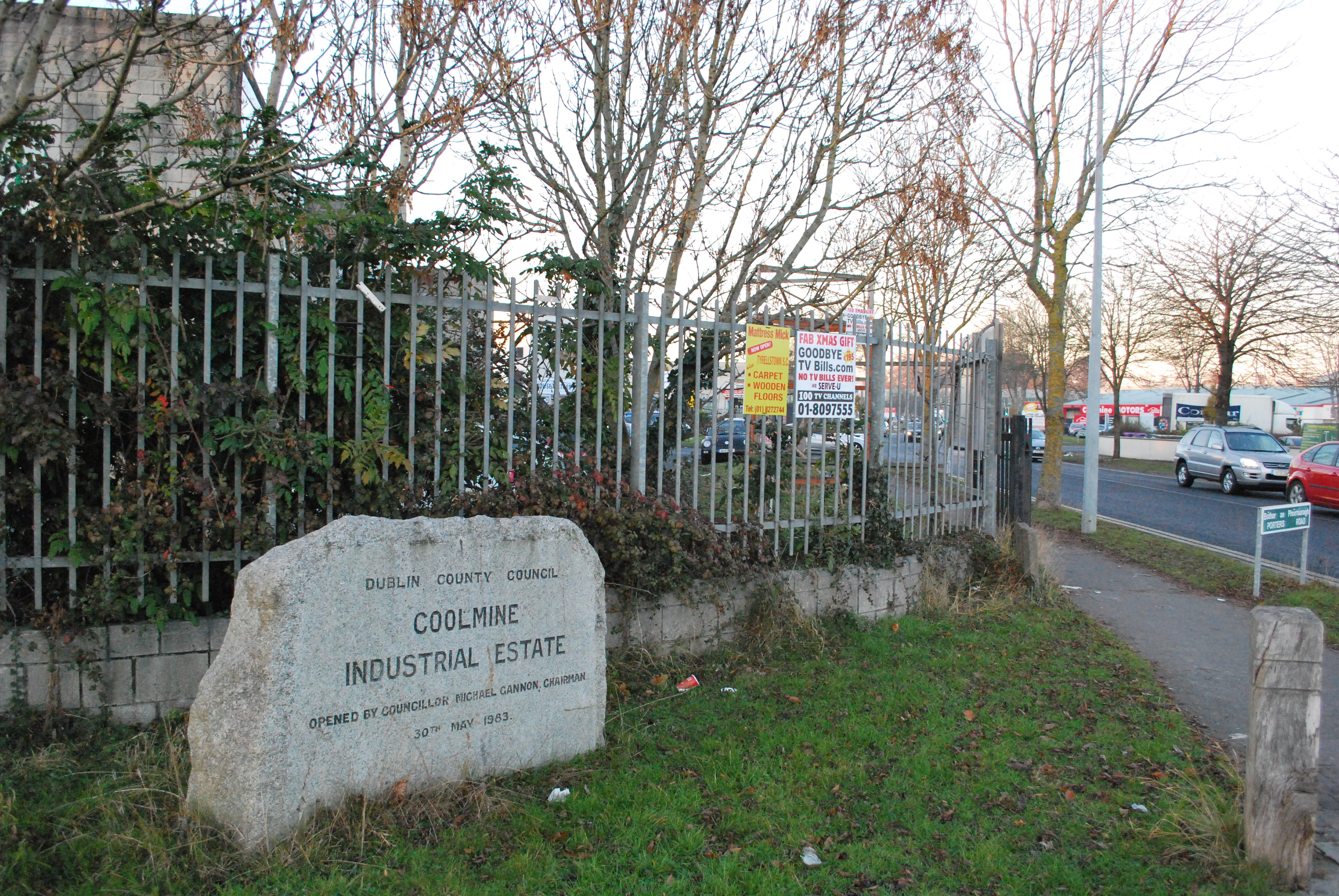
Coolmine industrial estate

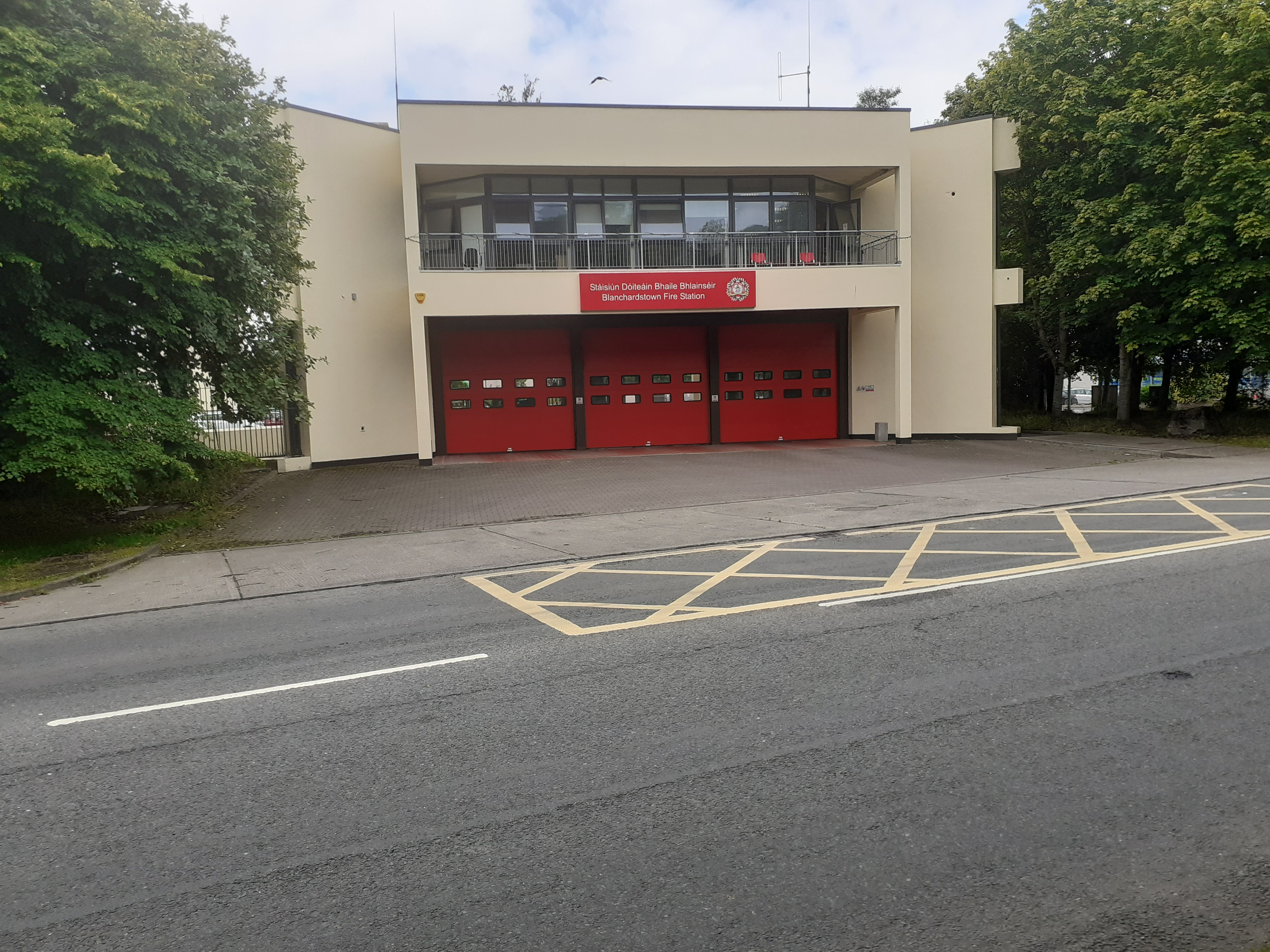
Blanchardstown Fire Station

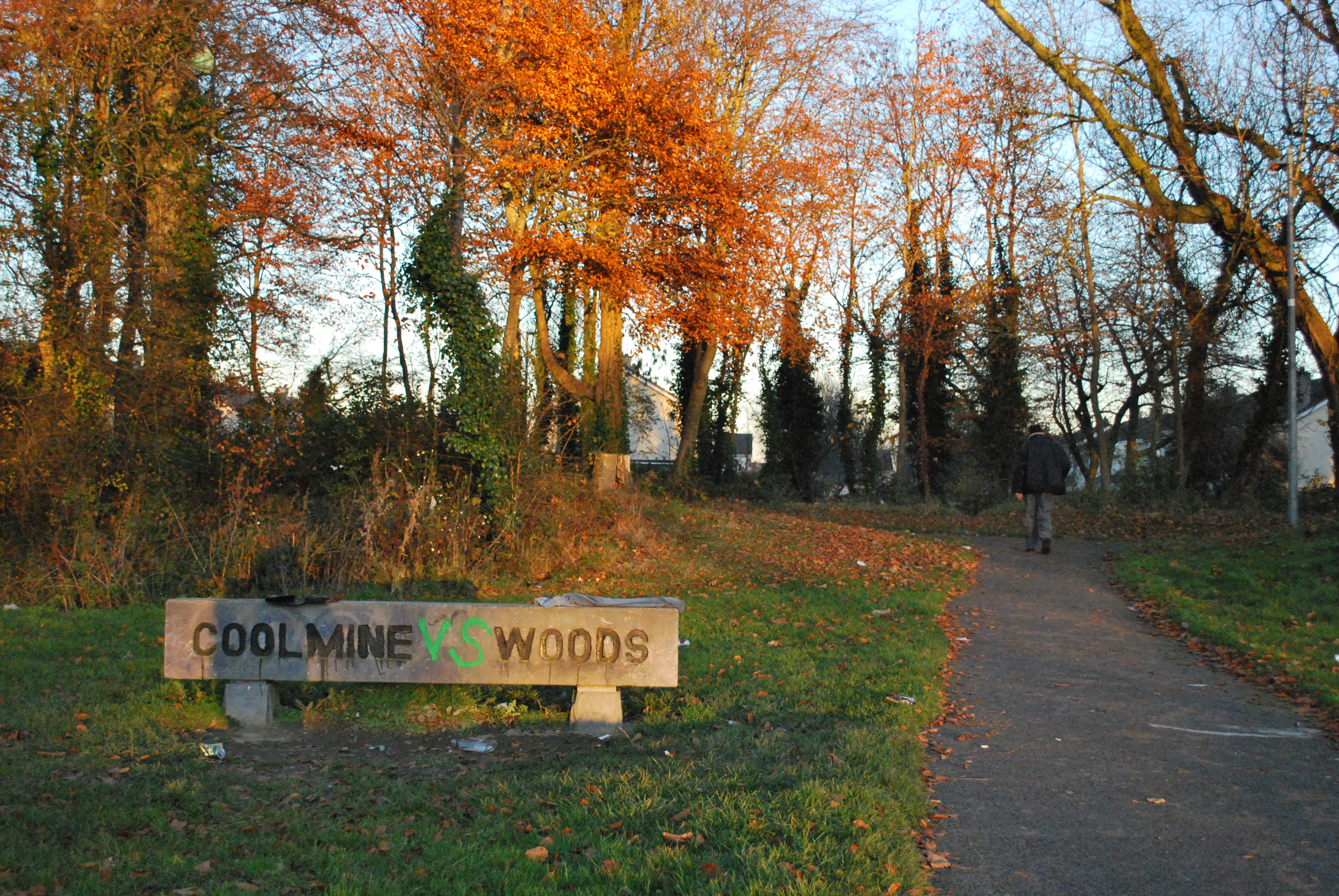
Coolmine woods sign

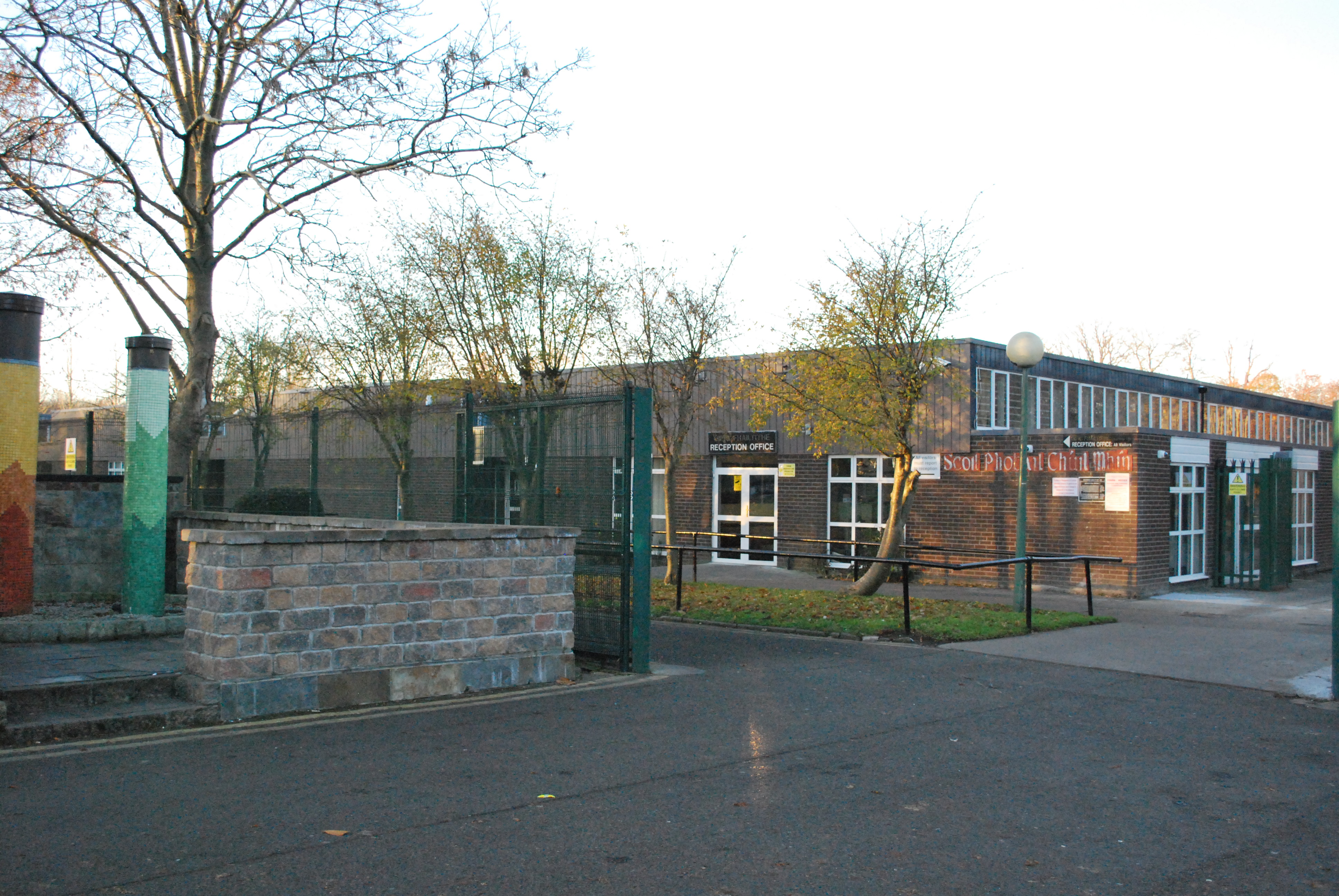
Coolmine Community School

== See also ==
- List of towns and villages in Ireland
