= Fíona Scarlett =

Irish novelist

- Born: Early 1980s Dublin, Ireland
- Occupation: Creative writing teacher
- Spouse: Dermot

Fíona Scarlett is an Irish writer. She has had two novels published: Boys Don’t Cry (2021) and May All Your Skies Be Blue (2025).

== Early life ==
From Dublin, Scarlett went to Coolmine Community School.

She was often in the library on a Saturday, reading books by Agatha Christie and Stephen King. Other favourite writers include Maeve Binchy, Marian Keyes and Paul Murray. After she married him and began having children, and when they had some time away from the children at a wedding, she told her husband Dermot, a musician, that she wanted to become a writer.

With her husband’s approval, Scarlett looked up writing courses on the Internet. She decided to do a distance education course that suited her family. She continued to look after her children whilst she completed the course. Towards the end of the course, Scarlett began an early draft of what was to be her debut novel. She got the idea when she was scrolling through Twitter in February 2018.

== Writing ==
Scarlett’s debut novel Boys Don’t Cry’’ was published in April 2021. The Irish Times’’ described it as ’quietly devastating’, whilst a review in the Irish Independent’’ described it as a ’slimmer, Dublin version of Booker Prize winner Shuggie Bain’’ by Douglas Stuart.

Boys Don’t Cry was an international bestseller. Then the Arts Council, an "Irish government agency for developing the arts", gave Scarlett some money. Her second novel May All Your Skies Be Blue was published by Faber & Faber in 2025.

She had already begun May All Your Skies Be Blue before her debut novel was published. She revised her original draft, excitedly telling an editor: "I'm adding in a car chase, and I'm adding in a wife, and I'm adding in babies". As well as a love story involving the two main characters, Scarlett filled the book with nostalgic references to the 1990s, including skin care and perfume company The Body Shop, English rock band Blur and the video retailer Xtra-vision.

Scarlett also writes what she describes as "sort of funny little stories for children". She has taught creative writing at several institutions in Ireland. Scarlett is working on a third book.

== Personal life ==
She lives in Clane with her husband and her children.
