= Coolmine Community School =

Secondary school in Dublin, Ireland

Coordinates: 53.3887°N 6.3956°W

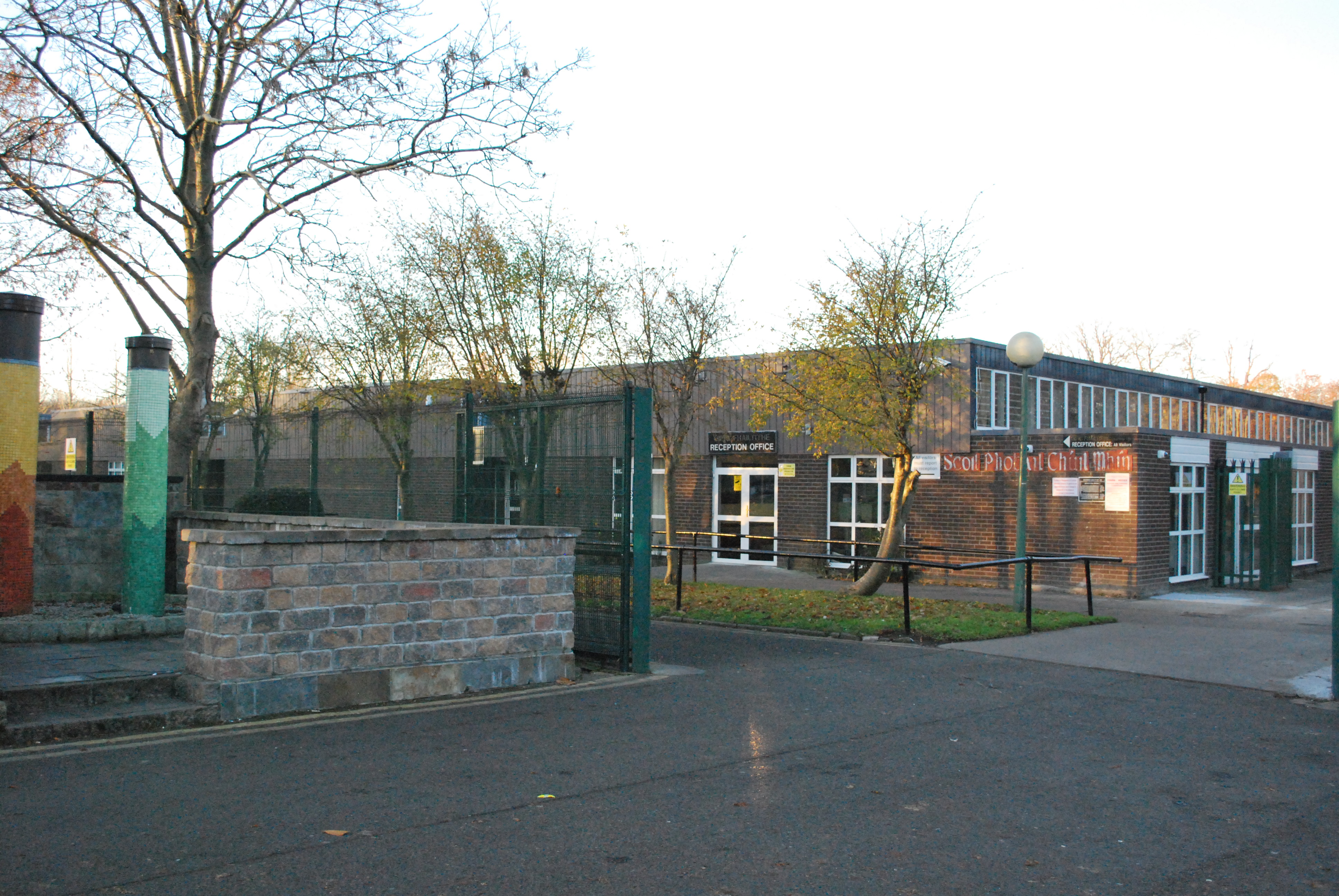
- Established: 1972
- Location: Coolmine
- Website: www.coolminecs.ie

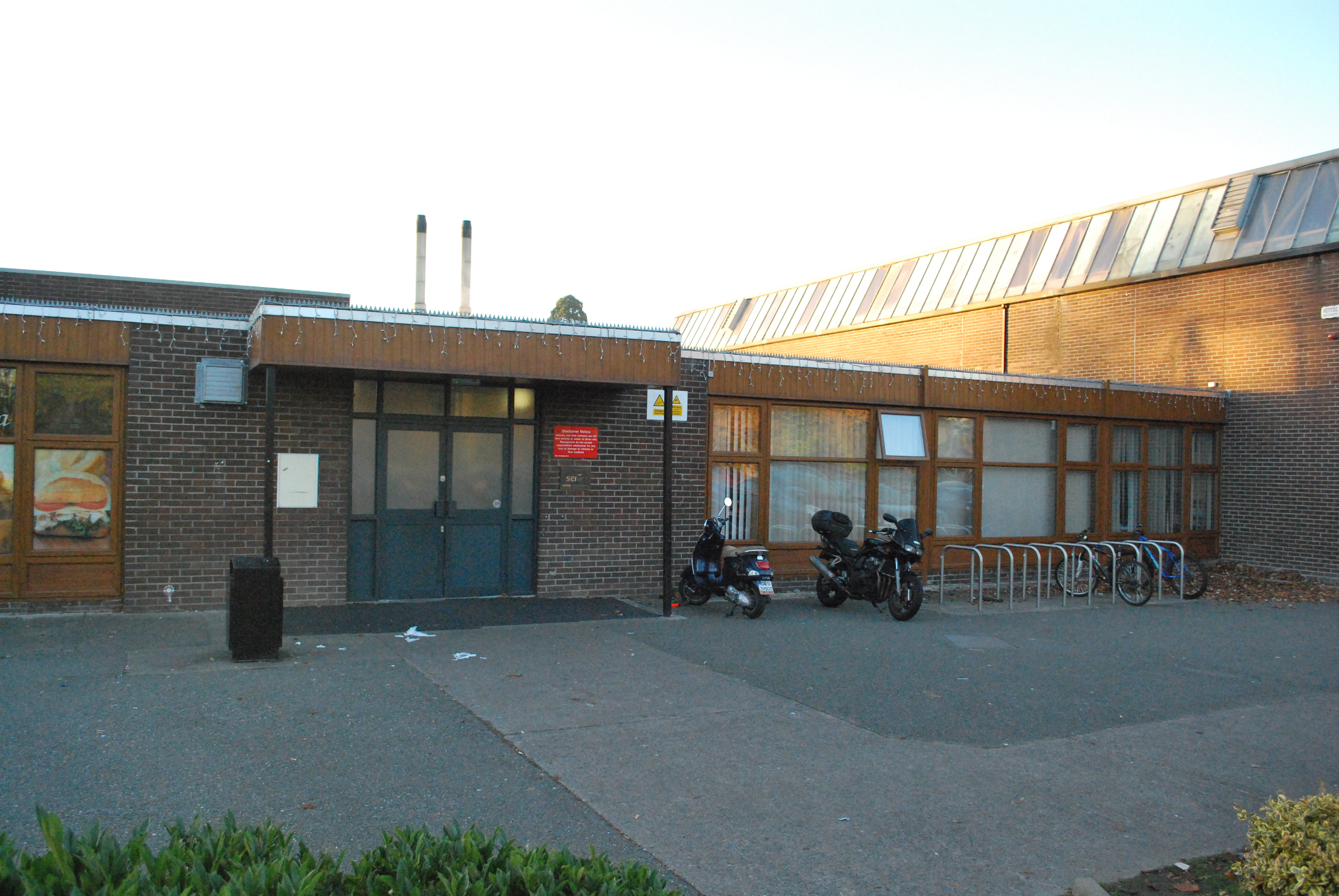
Main entrance into Coolmine Leisure Centre

Coolmine Community School (Irish: Scoil Pobail Chúil Mhín) is a co-educational secondary school in the Coolmine suburb of Dublin. It lies within Greater Blanchardstown in the administration of Fingal.

== History ==
The school was one of the two first community schools founded in Ireland, in 1972, and was officially blessed and opened in 1974. It was established by the State after considerable discussion between a local parents' committee, the Department of Education, the Vocational Education Committee and the Roman Catholic Archdiocese of Dublin, with a view to integrating the traditional academic approach of the secondary schools with the tradition of the vocational schools.

== Operations ==
The school caters for over 1,200 pupils, both boys and girls, aged from 12 to 19 years, who live mainly within a geographically defined catchment area. The premises includes a sports and leisure complex with an indoor heated swimming pool.

The school crest embodies a stylised version of Crois Bhríde, or St Brigid's Cross, with the early Irish symbol of the Holy Trinity surrounded by the "C" of community and underlined by the motto "Creideamh Beo", living faith.

== Notable past pupils ==
- Joanne Cantwell, sports broadcaster
- Philip Cassidy, former professional cyclist
- Martin Earley, former professional cyclist
- Jade Jordan, actor and author
- Mark Kennedy, former Ireland international footballer
- Fíona Scarlett, author
