= Animal, Vegetable, Mineral? =

British TV game show (1952–1959)

- Genre: Panel show
- Created by: Nora Wood
- Presented by: Lionel Hale; Glyn Daniel; Barry Cunliffe
- Country of origin: United Kingdom
- Original language: English
- No. of series: 7 (BBC-tv); 1 (BBC2)
- No. of episodes: 116 (BBC-tv); 14 (BBC2)

Production
- Running time: 30 minutes

Original release
- Network: BBC Television Service
- Release: 23 October 1952 – 18 March 1959
- Network: BBC2
- Release: 30 May – 29 August 1971

Animal, Vegetable, Mineral? is a British television panel show which originally ran from 23 October 1952 to 18 March 1959. In the show, a panel of archaeologists, art historians, and natural history experts were asked to identify interesting objects or artefacts from museums from Britain and abroad, and other faculties, including university collections.

The quiz show was presented by the BBC, continuing a long history of bringing contributors to archaeology into the media limelight. Writing in 1953, the critic C.A. Lejeune described the show as having "a sound, full-bodied, vintage flavour".

== History ==
The UK television show was modelled on an American TV show called What in the World? that was developed by Froelich Rainey. The first episode of Animal, Vegetable, Mineral? was broadcast on 23 October 1952 and was hosted by Lionel Hale and produced by Paul Johnstone. Hale soon stood down as chairman, after an early episode in which he was challenged by Thomas Bodkin about the age of one of the objects shown, in favour of the archaeologist Glyn Daniel, who continued as the regular chairman and scorer for the next seven years.

The most frequent member of the discussion panel was the renowned archaeologist Sir Mortimer Wheeler, who was voted TV personality of the year in 1954, providing the world of archaeology with its first media star. Daniel won the award the following year.

The last episode of original series was broadcast on 18 March 1959, after which the programme was cancelled, partly because of Daniel's association with Anglia Television. It was briefly revived as A.V.M? in 1971, directed by Bob Toner, with Barry Cunliffe as the chairman.

== Programme information ==
The person responsible for choosing the artefact for each episode was Sir David Attenborough, who was also the camera director. However, on the Christmas special in 1956, Glyn Daniel and Sir Mortimer Wheeler selected items for Attenborough and other production staff to examine.

Inauthentic items were occasionally included: for example, a stone axe made by the forger 'Flint Jack' or fake Crown Derby ware. On one occasion, Sir Julian Huxley was unable to identify a modern mock-up of a stuffed great auk as a fake, and on another Huxley lost a £1 bet after failing to recognise the egg of the African giant snail. Occasionally the presenter would try to fool the panel with a corroded modern artefact e.g. a part of a pram or a bicycle.

The signature music for the series was the prelude to Partita No. 3 in E major by Johann Sebastian Bach.

== Transmissions ==
=== BBC Television Service ===
Series	Start date	End date	Episodes
1	23 October 1952	23 July 1953	20
2	15 October 1953	10 June 1954	18
3	14 October 1954	28 July 1955	19
4	22 September 1955	28 June 1956	21
5	4 October 1956	27 June 1957	20
6	17 October 1957	27 December 1957	6
7	1 October 1958	18 March 1959	12

=== BBC2 ===
Series	Start date	End date	Episodes
1	30 May 1971	29 August 1971	14

== Controversies ==
Wheeler often "cheated" by investigating beforehand which objects had been removed from their next location, and looking up the relevant information about the corresponding items in catalogues. Nevertheless, Wheeler once stormed off set after taking offence when a junior producer offered to show him the planned items before an episode was filmed.

In 1957, an episode was broadcast in which the panel were asked to identify the ethnic origins of a selection of human volunteers. The anthropologist Margaret Mead disrupted the episode by repeatedly claiming that examples of each ethnic group could be seen at Grand Central Station in New York City. Mead was not invited to take part in the show again.

On one occasion, a BBC spokesman stated that Glyn Daniel presented the show while suffering from influenza, as during a discussion about a sheaf of poisoned arrows from the Sarawak State Museum he said on air that "there are a few million people I would like to kill – mostly viewers". Attenborough explained in his autobiography that Daniel had presented the programme while drunk. On another occasion, Leigh Ashton, the Director of the Victoria and Albert Museum, also appeared while drunk, and fell asleep after incorrectly stating the first three objects shown to be fakes.

On one of the show's overseas visits, an episode had to be re-located to the Musée de l'Homme in Paris after the National Archaeological Museum refused permission to film.

== Legacy ==
The show was the forerunner of other popular BBC archaeology programmes, such as Buried Treasure and Chronicle. It was credited with contributing to the rise in popularity of archaeology in Britain in the 1950s, which resulted in increased museum attendance and library use. Daniel reported the Director-General of the BBC, Sir Ian Jacob, as stating that "the two most popular things on television seemed to be archaeology and show-jumping". On several occasions the show caused museums' identifications of objects to be amended based on information provided by the panel or by the viewing public.

Its format was often referenced in comedy shows: Not Only...But Also, At Last the 1948 Show, Do Not Adjust Your Set and The Complete and Utter History of Britain each contained sketches with experts analyzing a "mystery object", often resulting in totally wrong conclusions or, in At Last the 1948 Show, in the items getting destroyed. Even in the 21st century, Animal, Vegetable, Mineral? was still referenced in the second episode of The Armstrong & Miller Show: Its simple set-up was parodied with a fictional black & white programme called "How many hats?".

In September 2011, University College London performed a one-off revival of Animal, Vegetable, Mineral?. The panel of experts included Claire Thomson (Scandinavian Studies), Ryan Nichol (Physics and Astronomy), Tom Stern (Philosophy) and Sam Turvey (Institute of Zoology). It was hosted by Joe Flatman (Institute of Archaeology) and consisted of a visit to the UCL museum.

== Episodes ==
Only four episodes exist in the BBC's archives, three of which are available to watch from the BBC iPlayer. The fourth one is mute, because its audio track has been lost.

Some (incomplete) episode information follows:

Date	Host	Challenger	Panel	Notes
23 October 1952	Lionel Hale		Thomas Bodkin	
6 November 1952	Glyn Daniel	Pitt Rivers Museum	Sir Julian Huxley, T. C. Lethbridge, Sir Mortimer Wheeler	
30 April 1953	Glyn Daniel		Thomas Bodkin, W.E. Swinton, Sir Mortimer Wheeler	
21 January 1954		University College Museum, Bangor University	Sir Mortimer Wheeler	
4 March 1954		Ashmolean Museum		
29 April 1954		British Museum		
14 October 1954			Thomas Bodkin, Johannes Brøndsted, Sir Mortimer Wheeler	
28 October 1954	Glyn Daniel, Froelich Rainey	Manchester Museum	Geoffrey Bushnell, Froelich Rainey, Sir Mortimer Wheeler, Glyn Daniel	Available in BBC archive. Daniel and Rainey swapped roles for part of the show. Final score 14/20.
11 November 1954	Glyn Daniel	Sheffield City Museum	Adrian Digby, Hugh Shortt, Edward Wenham	
24 December 1954	Glyn Daniel		Thomas Bodkin, Hugh Shortt, Sir Mortimer Wheeler	
27 January 1955	Glyn Daniel	Grosvenor Museum	Sir Mortimer Wheeler	
21 April 1955	Glyn Daniel	Birmingham Museum and Art Gallery	Thomas Bodkin, Adrian Digby, Sir Mortimer Wheeler	Fiftieth episode
3 May 1956	Glyn Daniel	National Museum of Prague	V. Gordon Childe, Seán P. Ó Ríordáin, Sir Mortimer Wheeler	Available in BBC archive. Final score 22/20.
17 May 1956	John Betjeman	Metropolitan Museum of Art, New York	Stephen Bone, Sir Gerald Kelly, Mary Woodall	
1 October 1958	Glyn Daniel	Victoria and Albert Museum	Thomas Bodkin, Hugh Shortt, Sir Mortimer Wheeler	Available in BBC archive. Final score 19/20.
15 October 1958	Glyn Daniel	Imperial War Museum	Charles Appleby, Charles Thomas, Sir Mortimer Wheeler	
30 May 1971	Barry Cunliffe	Roman occupation of Britain	Tony Birley, Kate Pretty, John Wild	
6 June 1971	Barry Cunliffe	Early Celtic Britain	Kate Pretty, Leo Rivet, John Wild	
13 June 1971	Barry Cunliffe	Neolithic and Bronze Age	Humphrey Case, Kate Pretty, Colin Renfrew	
20 June 1971	Barry Cunliffe	Development sites	Phil Barker, Peter Fowler, Kate Pretty	
27 June 1971	Barry Cunliffe	Britain 500 to 1066	Peter Fowler, Kate Pretty, Charles Thomas	
4 July 1971	Barry Cunliffe	Middle America	Phil Barker, Martin Biddle, Kate Pretty	
11 July 1971	Barry Cunliffe	New and Old World civilisations	Norman Hammond, Kate Pretty, Colin Renfrew	
18 July 1971	Barry Cunliffe	Britain in the Middle Ages	Norman Hammond, Kate Pretty, Eric Thompson	
25 July 1971	Barry Cunliffe	Fishbourne Roman Palace	Tony Birley, Kate Pretty, John Wild	
1 August 1971	Barry Cunliffe	Civilisations of the Eastern Mediterranean	Warwick Bray, Norman Hammond, Colin Renfrew	
8 August 1971	Barry Cunliffe	Viking Age	Martin Biddle, Kate Pretty, Anna Ritchie	
15 August 1971	Barry Cunliffe	Fishbourne Roman Palace	Ken Hawley, Hugh Shortt, John Wild	
22 August 1971	Barry Cunliffe	Beamish Museum	Neil Cossons, Norman Hammond, Kenneth Hudson	With Frank Atkinson.
29 August 1971	Barry Cunliffe	Viewers requests	Martin Biddle, Kate Pretty, Colin Renfrew	

== Cast and crew ==
A partial cast list is available.

Name	Appeared As	Episodes
Charles Appleby	Panellist	Unknown episodes
Frank Atkinson	Challenger	One episode, 1971
David Attenborough	Producer	Unknown episodes
John Betjeman	Panellist & Chairman	Unknown episodes
Martin Biddle	Panellist	Three episodes, 1971
Tony Birley	Panellist	Two episodes, 1971
Anthony Blunt	Panellist	One episode, 1956
Thomas Bodkin	Panellist	Unknown episodes
Stephen Bone	Panellist	Unknown episodes
Warwick Bray	Panellist	One episode, 1971
Johannes Brøndsted	Panellist	One episode, 1954
Geoffrey Bushnell	Panellist	Unknown episodes
Humphrey Case	Panellist	One episode, 1971
V. Gordon Childe	Panellist	Unknown episodes
Norman 'Bill' Cook	Panellist	Unknown episodes
Neil Cossons	Panellist	One episode, 1971
Barry Cunliffe	Chairman	Fourteen episodes, 1971
Glyn Daniel	Chairman & Panellist	Unknown episodes
Adrian Digby	Panellist	One episode, 1952
Lionel Hale	Panellist	Episode 1, 1952
Norman Hammond	Panellist	Four episodes, 1971
Ken Hawley	Panellist	One episode, 1971
Jacquetta Hawkes	Panellist	Unknown episodes
Kenneth Hudson	Panellist	One episode, 1971
Julian Huxley	Panellist	Unknown episodes
Paul Johnstone	Producer	Unknown episodes
Gerald Kelly	Panellist	Unknown episodes
Kathleen Kenyon	Panellist	One episode, November 1955
James Laver	Panellist	One episode, 1952
T. C. Lethbridge	Panellist	One episode, 1952
Margaret Mead	Panellist	One episode, 1957
Seán P. Ó Ríordáin	Panellist	Unknown episodes
Stuart Piggott	Panellist	Unknown episodes
Kate Pretty	Panellist	Ten episodes, 1971
Froelich Rainey	Panellist & Chairman	Unknown episodes
Colin Renfrew	Panellist	Four episodes, 1971
Anna Ritchie	Panellist	One episode, 1971
Leo Rivet	Panellist	One episode, 1971
Hugh Shortt	Panellist	Unknown episodes
John Summerson	Panellist	Unknown episodes
W.E. Swinton	Panellist	Unknown episodes
Charles Thomas	Panellist	Unknown episodes
Nancy Thomas	Presenter	Episode 1, 1952
Eric Thompson	Panellist	One episode, 1971
Edward Wenham	Panellist	Unknown episodes
Mortimer Wheeler	Panellist	Unknown episodes
John Wild	Panellist	Four episodes, 1971
Mary Woodall	Panellist	Unknown episodes
