= Carvel (boat building) =

Method of building a boat

A comparison of clinker and carvel construction. Carvel frames are much heavier than clinker ribs.

Carvel built or carvel planking is a method of boat building in which hull planks are laid edge to edge and fastened to a robust frame, thereby forming a smooth surface. Traditionally the planks are neither attached to, nor slotted into, each other, having only a caulking sealant between the planks to keep water out. Modern carvel builders may attach the planks to each other with glues and fixings. It is a "frame first" method of hull construction, where the shape is determined by the framework onto which the planks are fixed. This is in contrast to "plank first" or "shell first" methods, where the outer skin of the hull is made and then reinforced by the insertion of timbers that are fitted to that shape. The most common modern "plank first" method is clinker construction; in the classical period "plank first" involved joining the edges of planks with mortise and tenon joints within the thickness of the timbers, superficially giving the smooth-hull appearance of carvel construction, but achieved by entirely different means.

Compared to clinker-built hulls, carvel construction allowed larger ships to be built. This is because the fastenings of a clinker hull took all the hogging and sagging forces imposed by the ship moving through large waves. In carvel construction, these forces are also taken by the edge-to-edge contact of the hull planks.

== Etymology ==
From Middle English carvel, carvelle, carvile, kervel ('small ship'; 'caravel'); from Old French caruelle, carvelle, kirvelle. The term was used in English when caravels became popular in Northern European waters from c. 1440 onwards, and the method of hull construction took the name of the first vessel type made in that way in English and European shipyards. In late medieval Danish, Swedish, and German, various terms were used to refer to carvel ships, including kraffel, karfell, krawegel, kravel, krauell, crauell, and craueln.

== History ==
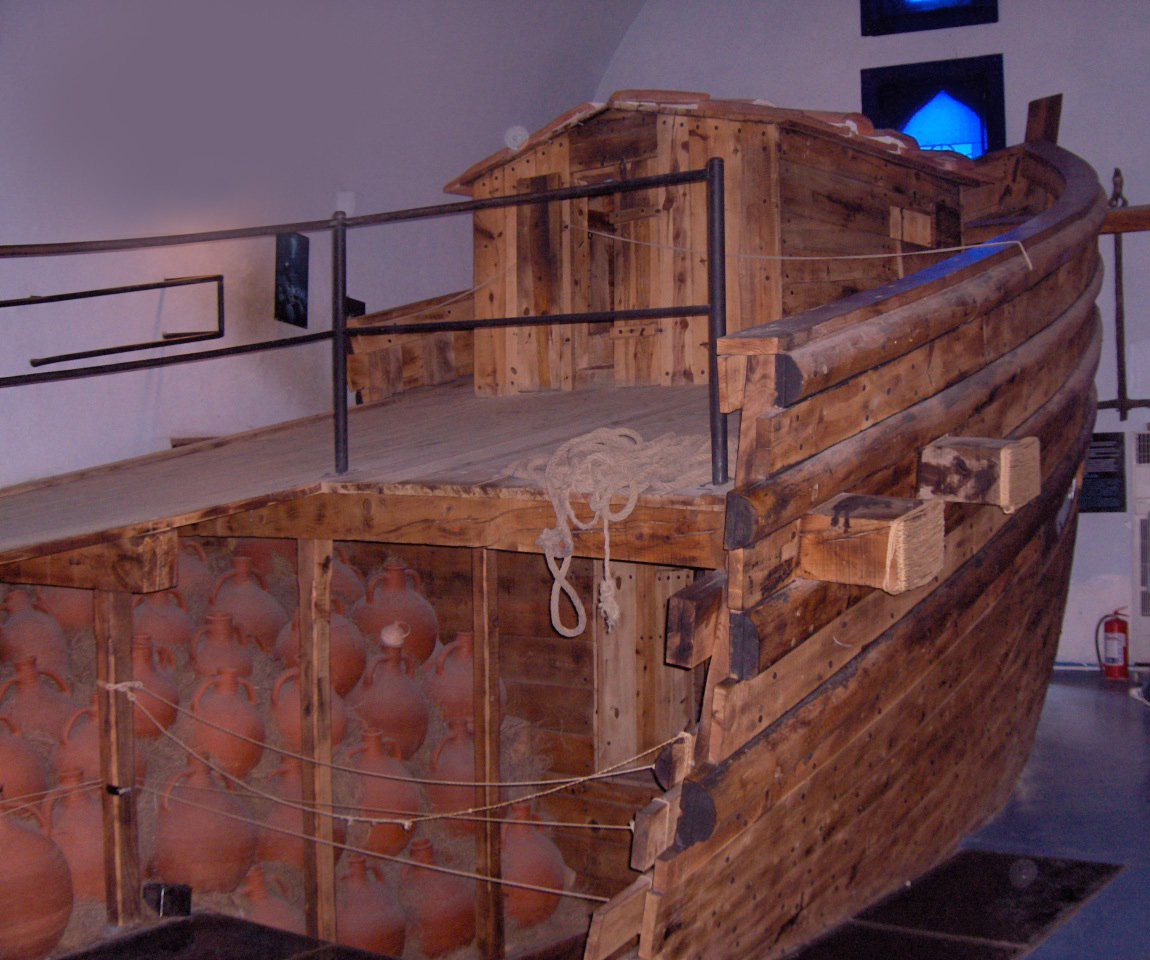
Reconstruction of the Yassi Ada shipwreck.

Carvel construction originated in the Mediterranean during the first millennium CE. It gradually replaced the edge-to-edge joining of hull planks by mortises and tenons – a "planking first" technique – which had been used by ancient Egyptians, Phoenicians and for much of classical antiquity. Archaeological evidence for this transition suggests it took place from c. 500 CE to the 9th century. Its slow adoption involved some variation and experimentation. Some ships were built using "framing-first", as opposed to the full "frame-first" system. In "framing-first", some of the framing is installed in the lower part of the hull, followed by the planking of that area, more framing is added to increase the height of the hull, and then more planking added to that. (The Romano-Celtic ship-building tradition of Northern Europe used "framing-first", but this part of Europe did not adopt the full "frame-first" method until much later, as discussed below.)

The changeover from planking-first to frame-first happened over the same period that the Mediterranean Square Sail rig was being replaced by lateen rig. That change has been suggested to save building, fitting out and maintenance costs (though previously it was thought to be to achieve better sailing performance – something which, against the presumptions of many maritime historians, can be shown not to have happened). The move to carvel construction is believed to be another cost-saving measure (though it is felt that this is not well understood by marine archaeologists). The difficult skill of mortising planks at precisely the right angle (where the hull is curved at the turn of the bilges) is avoided. Carvel construction allows hull shape to be determined by design, whilst planking-first relies on the "eye" of the builder. Therefore fewer very highly skilled personnel are needed.

One of the transitional ships is the Yassi Ada ship (seventh century CE), which was excavated between 1960 and 1965. This had the lower strakes of planking fastened edge-to-edge with mortises and tenons, then the floors were added, followed by more planking joined with tenons. This brought the planking up to the waterline. Further frames were added to this next set of planking, but these continued up to the height of the intended sheerline. The strakes from the waterline up were then fastened on as carvel planking (with some wales interspersed with the regular strakes).

Northern Europe used clinker construction for the period discussed above, and into the 15th century (and continued to do so for many small craft into the present day). The different methods were known of by mariners in both places, but when, for instance, Mediterranean galleys were employed by the French and English during the Hundred Years' War, shipwrights familiar with carvel work had to be recruited to carry out maintenance and repairs. In the 1440s interest in the caravel grew in northern waters and shipyards there started building caravels in carvel construction.

An archaeological example of an early carvel-built ship in the Baltic region is the wreck of Gribshunden, flagship of the Danish-Norwegian King Hans. The heavily-armed three-masted ship was built in 1484 probably near Rotterdam, and served as Hans's "floating castle" for ten years before sinking in June 1495.

=== Relationship between clinker and carvel ===
Clinker was the predominant method of ship construction used in Northern Europe before the carvel. In clinker built hulls, the planked edges overlap; carvel construction with its strong framing gives a heavier but more rigid hull, capable of taking a variety of sail rigs. Clinker (lapstrake) construction involves longitudinal overlapping "riven timber" (split wood) planks that are fixed together over very light scantlings. A carvel boat has a smoother surface which gives the impression that it is more hydrodynamically efficient since the exposed edges of the clinker planking appear to disturb the streamline and cause drag. A clinker certainly has a slightly larger wetted area, but a carvel hull is not necessarily more efficient: for given hull strength, the clinker boat is overall lighter, and displaces less water than a heavily-framed carvel hull.

As cargo vessels become bigger, the vessel's weight becomes small in comparison with total displacement; and for a given external volume, there is greater internal hull space available. A clinker vessel whose ribs occupy less space than a carvel vessel's is more suitable for cargo which is bulky rather than dense.

A structural benefit of clinker construction is that it produces a vessel that can safely twist and flex around its long axis (running from bow to stern). This is an advantage in North Atlantic rollers, provided the vessel has a small overall displacement. Due to the light nature of the construction method, increasing the beam did not commensurately increase the vessel's survivability under the twisting forces arising if, for example, when sailing downwind, the wave-train impinges on the quarter rather than dead astern. In these conditions greater beam widths may have made clinker vessels more vulnerable. As torsional forces increased in proportion to displaced (or cargo) weight, the forces incident on the hull imposed an upper limit on the size of clinker-built vessels. The greater rigidity of carvel construction became necessary for larger offshore cargo vessels. Later carvel-built sailing vessels exceeded the maximum size of clinker-built ships several times over.

A further clinker limitation is that it does not readily support the point loads associated with lateen or sloop sailing rigs. At least some fore-and-aft sails are desirable for manoeuvrability. The same problem in providing for concentrated loads creates difficulties siting and supporting a centerboard or deep keel, which is much needed when sailing across or close to the wind. Timbers can be added as necessary compromise but always with some loss of the fundamental benefits of the construction method. Clinker construction remains a useful method of construction for small wooden vessels, especially for sea-going dinghies which need to be light enough to be readily moved and stored when out of the water.

=== Modern carvel methods ===
Traditional carvel methods leave a small gap between each plank that is caulked with "caulking cotton", or any suitable soft, flexible, fibrous material,(such as kapok) sometimes combined with a thick binding substance, which would gradually wear out and the hull would leak. When the boat was beached for a length of time, the planks would dry and shrink, so when first refloated, the hull would leak badly unless re-caulked, a time-consuming and physically demanding job. The modern variation is to use much narrower planks that are edge-glued instead of being caulked. With modern power sanders a much smoother hull is produced, as all the small ridges between the planks can be removed. This method started to become more common in the 1960s with the more widespread availability of waterproof glues, such as resorcinol (red glue) and then epoxy resin. Modern waterproof glues, especially epoxy resin, have caused revolutionary changes in carvel and clinker construction. Traditionally, nails provided the fastening strength; now it is the glue. It has become quite common since the 1980s for carvel and clinker construction to rely almost completely on glue for fastening. Many small boats, especially light plywood skiffs, are built without any mechanical fasteners such as nails and lag screws at all, as the glue is far stronger.
