= 1845 Royal Canal disaster =

19th-century canal accident in Ireland

Coordinates: 53.37976°N 6.40549°W

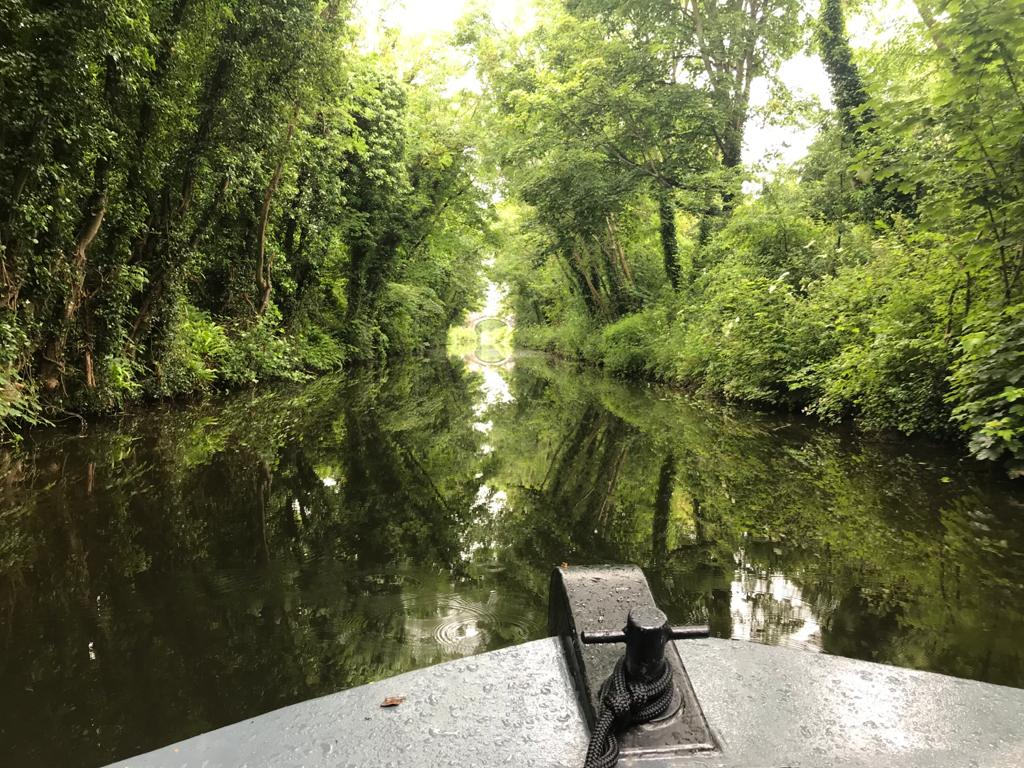
- Looking west along the Royal Canal between Kennan Bridge and Callaghan Bridge, somewhere along which the incident occurred, and in the same direction as pictured
- Date: 25 November 1845; 180 years ago
- Time: 4:00 p.m. (UTC±0)
- Venue: Night boat Longford
- Location: Royal Canal, near Clonsilla, County Dublin, United Kingdom of Great Britain and Ireland
- Type: Canal boat sinking
- Cause: Accidentally steered onto canal bank
- Deaths: 15 (drowned)
- Inquest: Henry Davis; J. Hamilton; Alexander Kirkpatrick
- Coroner: Henry Davis

The Royal Canal disaster of 1845 occurred on the evening of 25 November 1845 along the Royal Canal near Clonsilla, County Dublin, Ireland. The night boat Longford, on its way from Dublin to the town of Longford, was accidentally steered into the canal bank, causing it to tip over and take on water before sinking. Overloading of the boat and the rocky nature of the canal bank where the incident occurred may have contributed to the sinking, as the weight of the passengers shifted unexpectedly when the bow struck a solid obstacle. Of the 54 people on board at the time of the accident, 15 died.

== Background ==
Construction on the Royal Canal began in May 1790 and concluded in 1817 when it successfully joined Dublin with the River Shannon at Cloondara, County Longford. An additional spur linking the canal to Longford town was completed in 1831.

=== Passenger boats ===
The first passenger boats began operating on the Royal Canal in 1796, once construction had reached the town of Kilcock, County Kildare. Fares of a first-class cabin, or the cheaper second-class cabin were available to passengers, and both proved much cheaper than the equivalent cost for journeying by stagecoach. For example, the first-class fare from Dublin to the town of Leixlip by passenger boat in December 1796 was eight times cheaper than the equivalent journey by coach.

By the late 1820s, Bianconi's Coach and Car Service began to compete with low canal fares and started drawing some passengers away from it. In an attempt to win back business, in July 1833 the Royal Canal Company introduced "fly boats", lightweight boats "made from 16-gauge iron on timber ribs" which were copied from the "Scotch boats" then in use on the Glasgow, Paisley and Johnstone Canal in Scotland. Fly boats were faster than previously used vessels, and reduced the journey time from Dublin to Mullingar, for example, by four hours. The boats came at a higher maintenance cost of the canal however, due to the hooves of the galloping horses on the towpaths and the increased wash from the boats on the canal banks.

The Royal Canal Company did not operate a cargo transport service of its own along its canal, but it did outsource the operation of passenger services to contractors, advertising the positions by newspaper. Two passenger services were in operation from at least the 1830s, that of (i) a fast fly boat from Dublin to Mullingar, and (ii) a slower night boat from Dublin to Longford.

In the 1830s, the average annual number of passengers using the Royal Canal was 40,000.

=== Night boats to Longford ===
It is known that a night boat was operating from Dublin to Longford from at least the year 1830, as it was noted in John Watson Stewart's "The Gentleman's and Citizen's Almanack" for that year. The journey at that time took 22 hours and a half, in either direction:

- A Boat leaves the Broad Stone Harbour, each day at 2 o'Clock, and arrives in Longford the following Day, at half past 12 o'Clock.
- A Boat also leaves Longford, each day, at Eleven o'Clock, and arrives in Dublin, the following Morning, at half past nine o'Clock.
- Establishments have been formed for the conveyance of Boat-Passengers to and from Athlone, Newtown Forbes, Drumsna, Carrick-on-Shannon, Strokestown, Elphin, Roscommon, Castlerea, Boyle, Ballinafad, Colooney and Sligo.

The Irish Waterways History website describes the conditions under which the night boat service operated later in the decade: "From 1838 the night boat from Dublin left at two o'clock each afternoon; the boat from Longford left at half-past two." As with the 1830 format, the night boat schedule was arranged to allow links with Charles Bianconi's cars at Longford, which allowed passengers to continue their journeys by land to the further towns of Carrick-on-Shannon, Boyle and Sligo.

Terms of the contract specified that the night boat between Dublin and Longford needed to be drawn in 17 hours, "including the time of passing the Locks &c", consisting of an allowance of 10 hours to complete the distance from Dublin to Mullingar, and a further 7 hours between Mullingar and Longford. Irish Waterways History computed that this schedule would have required a speed of just over five statute miles per hour, including the time it would have taken to navigate through the locks, and that "contractors were subject to fines of one shilling per minute for lateness".

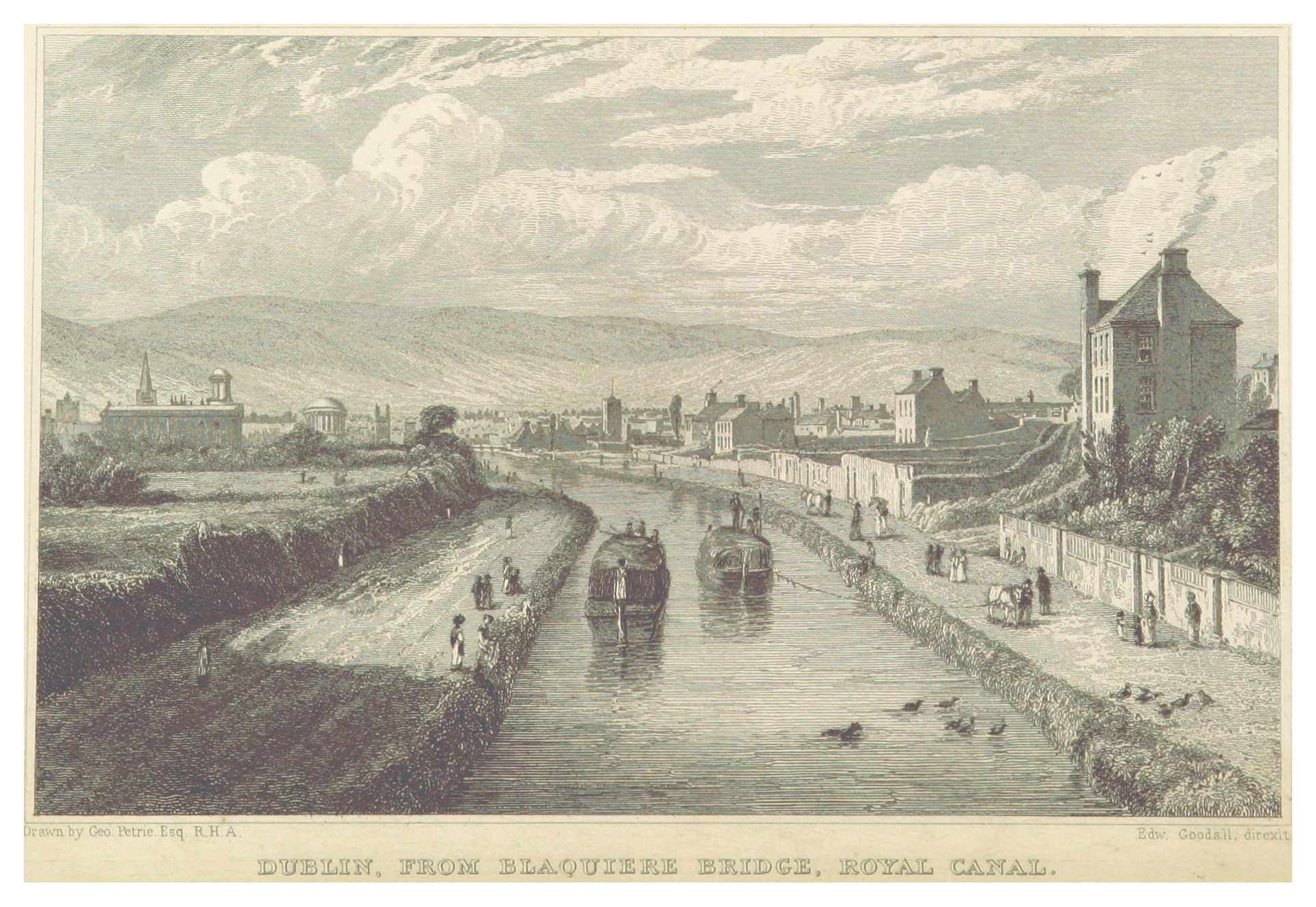
An illustration of boats on the Broadstone spur of the Royal Canal in Dublin, 1837

Mr. and Mrs. Samuel Carter Hall, co-authors of an 1843 travel book of Ireland, wrote of entering County Longford by a fast "fly-boat" which they found "exceedingly inconvenient (with) scarcely space to turn in the confined cabin". They compared the fly-boat to the alternative option of the night boat, opining:

"...There is also a more cumbrous vessel, called a "night boat", which travels at a much slower rate — about four miles an hour — and always at night. It is large, awkward, and lumbering, and is cheaply used by the peasantry on account of its cheapness."

The haulage of the passenger boats was also contracted out by the Royal Canal Company. The night boat on the evening of the accident was being hauled by one George Slack, who had 34 years' experience and explained during the subsequent inquest that he was "employed on the canal to ride the horse attached to the boat". He would typically ride one horse while driving another in front of him.

=== Design of the night boats ===
The night boats appear to have been heavier than the fly-boats; and Irish Waterways History note that the Royal Canal Company had "asked for tables in the cabins, shelves behind the seats and water closets" onboard. The company also requested a hinged gunwale so that the crew could easily walk about the boat. As usual with passenger boats of the era, the vessel was split into a first-class cabin, and a cheaper second-class cabin.

There was a steerage area at the rear of the boat which was spacious enough for two men to stand on. In the hold beneath the steerage area was a cooking area where "the cabin-boy boiled potatoes". A "boat mistress", and her servant, "kept a sort of floating tavern in the passage boats", according to details released at a separate court case from 1843, but were not official employees of the Canal Company proper. The boat mistresses role, as well as that of her servant (whom she paid), involved cleaning the boat, making fires and supplying the passengers and crew with meals.

The Irish Waterways History website notes that from the inquest hearings which were carried out after the 1845 disaster, "none of the evidence gives any clue to the location of the doors, windows or companions, (on the night boat) apart from the possibility that there was a companion from the steerage to the deck":

"It is clear that there were two principal cabins, the first forward of the second. There were other rooms too: the captain was in "an ante-room beside the cabin" when the accident occurred, while James Dunne was in another room, which he referred to once as the bar and then as an ante-room: he was clear that it was not the room the captain was in."

== Location of accident ==
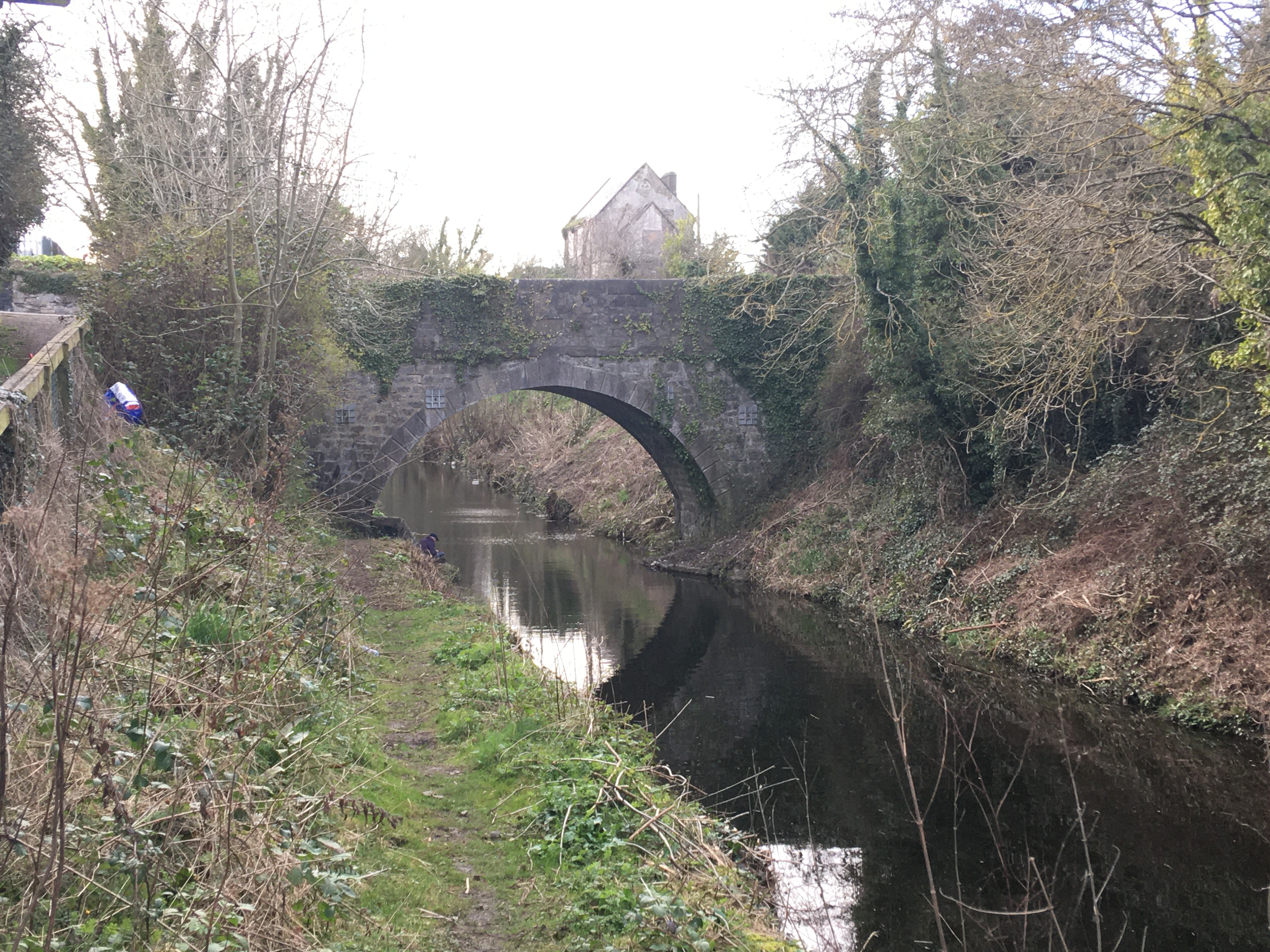
Looking west along the Royal Canal towards Kennan Bridge (aka Porterstown Bridge) in March 2020, the far side of which the incident occurred (Note: towpath is on the south side of the canal)

The accident happened west of a stretch of the canal known as the 'Deep Sinking', where the canal goes through a channel of limestone rock with steep banks either side. During the planning stage of the canal's construction in the late eighteenth century it was decided to blast through this outcrop of limestone (which included a limestone quarry at Clonsilla), instead of going over it using canal locks as would normally be the case, or avoiding the obstacle altogether via a flatter route. According to Peter Clarke, author of The Royal Canal 1789-1993, the Royal Canal Company had been advised at "an early stage (to) avoid this area", but had chosen to continue.

According to historian Rob Goodbody, the Deep Sinking "caused the canal company great trouble and expense due to the necessary depth and the hardness of the limestone that needed to be quarried out. Costs were minimised by cutting out a narrow channel with insufficient space for two boats to pass and with the towpath provided high above the canal." A 2011 industrial heritage survey commissioned by Fingal County Council found that the limestone extracted from the cutting "provided stone for bridges and lock chambers" in the building of the canal.

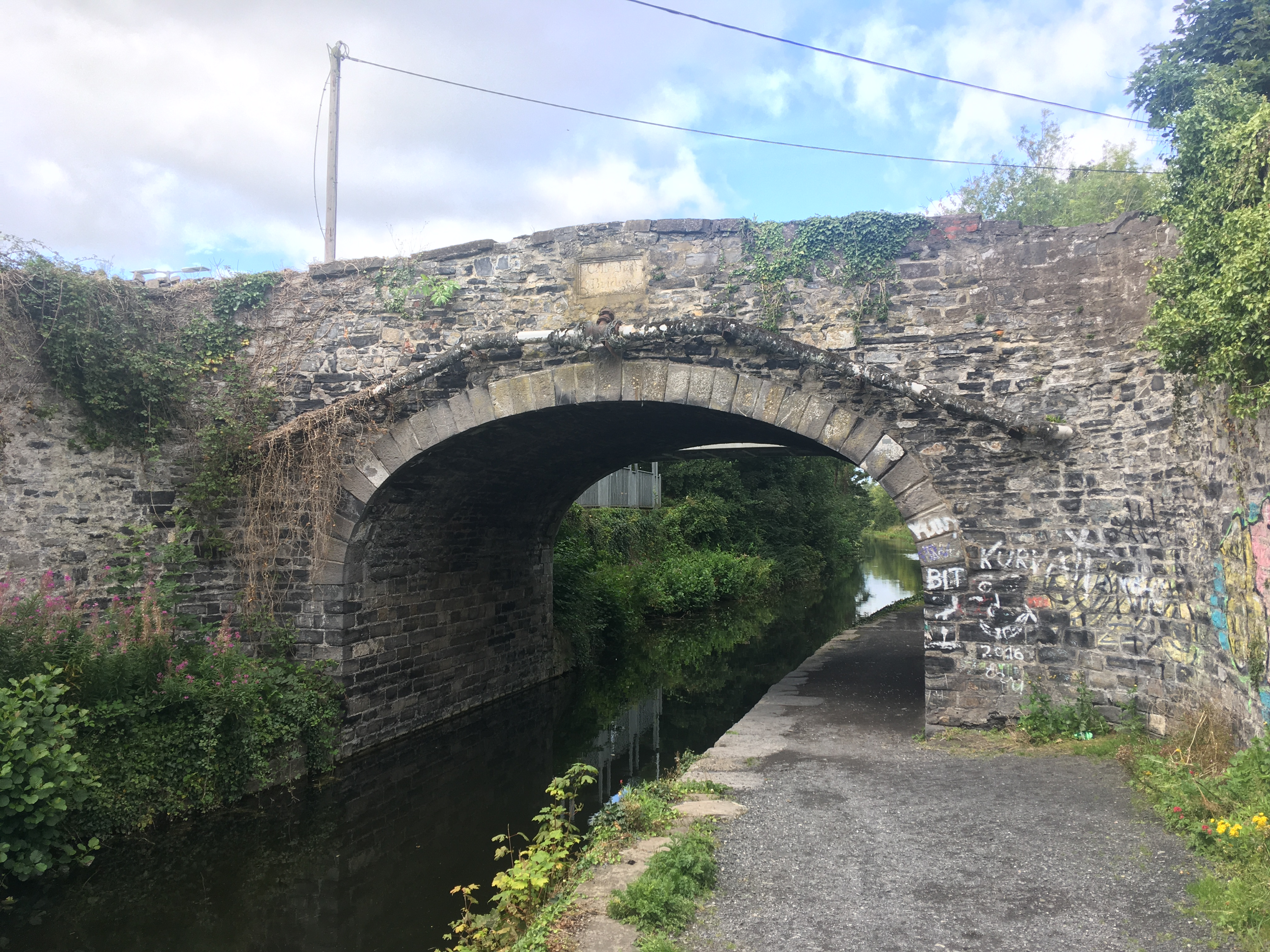
Looking west along the Royal Canal towards Callaghan Bridge (aka Clonsilla Bridge) in 2020 (Note: towpath is on the north side of the canal)

As stated, the accident happened just past the pronounced steep-sided Deep Sinking section of the canal at an unspecified point somewhere between Kennan Bridge and Callaghan Bridge, (aka Porterstown and Clonsilla bridges, respectively) in the region of Clonsilla, where the banks of the canal are less steep, but still consist of rock. The route the canal takes between the two bridges covers a distance of 1.2 km, crossing through the townlands of Porterstown, Kellystown and Clonsilla.

In describing the removal of the Longford night boat after the accident, a contemporary newspaper account in The Pilot noted that the vessel was floated from "where she had struck to the (sic) bank, close by the bridge", referring to Clonsilla Bridge (aka Callaghan Bridge), however the memorial plaque is located on the wall of Kennan (aka Porterstown) Bridge.

== Accident ==
On the day of the accident, the Longford began its journey from Broadstone harbour, Dublin at 2.00pm as usual, with captain Christopher O'Connor in command, and George Slack in charge of the two horses towing the boat. There were 48 passengers onboard, consisting of 10 first-cabin passengers and 38 second-cabin passengers, including two children. The crew consisted of six people (the captain, steerer, stop man, cabin boy, boat mistress and maid).

Just before 4.00pm, while it was approaching dusk and the boat was just two hours into its 17 hour journey, the Longford struck the rocky side of the canal. At the inquest, Slack later said that "when he felt the chuck (i.e. jerk) in the rope he put his horses back", and saw that "the boat turn upon her side: the bow was on the bank and the stern was in deep water".

According to passenger Robert Jessop, a private in the 8th King's Royal Irish Hussars based at the Cavalry Barracks in Longford, and one of a small number of passengers on deck at the time of the accident, "the boat, when she struck, fell upon one side, then upon the other; she rebounded, and went down as far as she could [..] The bow of the boat struck first; it pointed in an angle from the middle of the canal". The Irish Waterways History website note that Jessop "could not tell whether the boat (had) struck upon a rock or the bank, but it must have been a hard substance".

Captain Christopher O'Connor survived the accident, despite being below deck at the moment of impact, where he was "chang(ing) the sovereigns (he) had been collecting from the passengers in payment of their passage". O'Connor gave the following account to The Morning Post:

"The shock was not very violent, but the passengers rushed to the door; I rushed to the companion way, and the boat was heeled so as that the water went over the gunwale, but not so far as the companion way at that time. The passengers were rushing through the fore-cabin, and I saved one woman through the window; the stern of the boat was filling with water then. We then endeavoured to save as many as possible. The deck was not under water, but the windows were filled with water. The boat struck on her side. I did not take notice if any got out through the windows of the first cabin."

According to Irish Waterways History, all of the windows on the boat were barred, making escape for those trapped within impossible. Captain O'Connor and Thomas Savage, governor of Roscommon Gaol, who had been a passenger in the first cabin, broke open a hole in the roof of the boat and managed to withdraw one woman that way.

Before it grew dark, the crew with the help of the surviving passengers had "rescued all those they thought could be alive", according to Irish Waterways History. Of the 48 passengers, 15 had drowned including seven men, six women and the two children. All those who died had been trapped in the second cabin.

=== Aftermath ===
The Pilot reported that members of the public gathered at Clonsilla Bridge (aka Callaghan Bridge) the day after on Wednesday 26 November "to view the ill-fated packet boat, whose trip was terminated on the previous evening in so melancholy a manner, to behold the dead bodies of fifteen of the unhappy passengers (for such is the number of those that have perished), and to hear what would transpire at the inquest, which was about to be held at the cabin hard by, in case it were made known".

After the bodies had been retrieved, the boat was floated from "where she had struck to the (sic) bank, close by the bridge", and a lumber boat was brought alongside, and "the bodies removed into it". The Pilot noted how "The packet boat presented a strange appearance, the forepart of her deck having been broken up by the inmates of the cabin underneath in effecting their escape".

== Contemporary reports ==
The Cork Examiner reported on the incident with the following account dated 28 November 1845, reprinted from the Freeman:

The night boat to Longford started on (sic) yesterday at the usual hour, two o'clock in the afternoon. There were eight passengers in the fore or principal cabin, and considerably upwards of twenty in the after-cabin. Upon reaching the neighbourhood of Clonsilla, the steersman went below to dine, and unhappily committed the rudder, as we have been informed, to a boy employed onboard the boat.
This boy, either knowing nothing of the proper mode of steering, or not attending to the serious duty unfortunately and rashly committed to him, permitted the boat to run upon the bank of the canal, which caused her immediately to capsize, and speedily to fill with water. The fore-cabin passengers were saved, as that portion of the boat lay almost out of the water, which is, of course, shallow at the bank; the unhappy after-passengers plunged into the deepest portion of the canal, could not extricate themselves, and as no immediate assistance was at hand many of them have perished in the waters. At the time our correspondent left Clonsilla, sixteen (sic) of the drowned already crowded the banks, and the drags were plying busily in search of more.
This is a horrible calamity. It must be rigorously inquired into, and this frightful sacrifice of human life be excused by evidence or punished by law. – Freeman of Wednesday.

=== Initial misreporting of number of deaths ===
According to the Irish Waterways History website, "early press reports of the accident itself, notably that carried in the Freeman's Journal, said that sixteen people had died, but reports of the inquest gave the number as fifteen. The pre-inquest reports were inaccurate in other respects too: the total numbers of passengers were wrong and the chain of events that led to the accident was not properly described."

== Inquest ==
The Pilot notes that Henry Davis, Esquire, county coroner, held the inquest, assisted by J. Hamilton, Esq., M.P., and Alexander Kirkpatrick, Esq., one of the county magistrates.

The inquest lasted 2 days, during which the coroner suggested that Captain O'Connor should be charged with manslaughter, but this was not done. Amongst other things, the inquest found that the Royal Canal Company had no rules about the maximum numbers of passengers a boat could carry. Regarding the failure of the Royal Canal Company to adhere to regulations concerning the construction of the canal boat, the number of passengers it carried and the duties of the crew, it was fined £100 (equivalent to £10,513 in 2025).

Other recent safety issues with the Royal Canal Company were raised during the inquest, such as the "drowning of six people at Longford earlier in 1845 when a boat capsized and sank", and "the drowning of a four-year-old child when a heavily laden boat turned over and partly sank at Ballynacargy."

== Commemoration ==
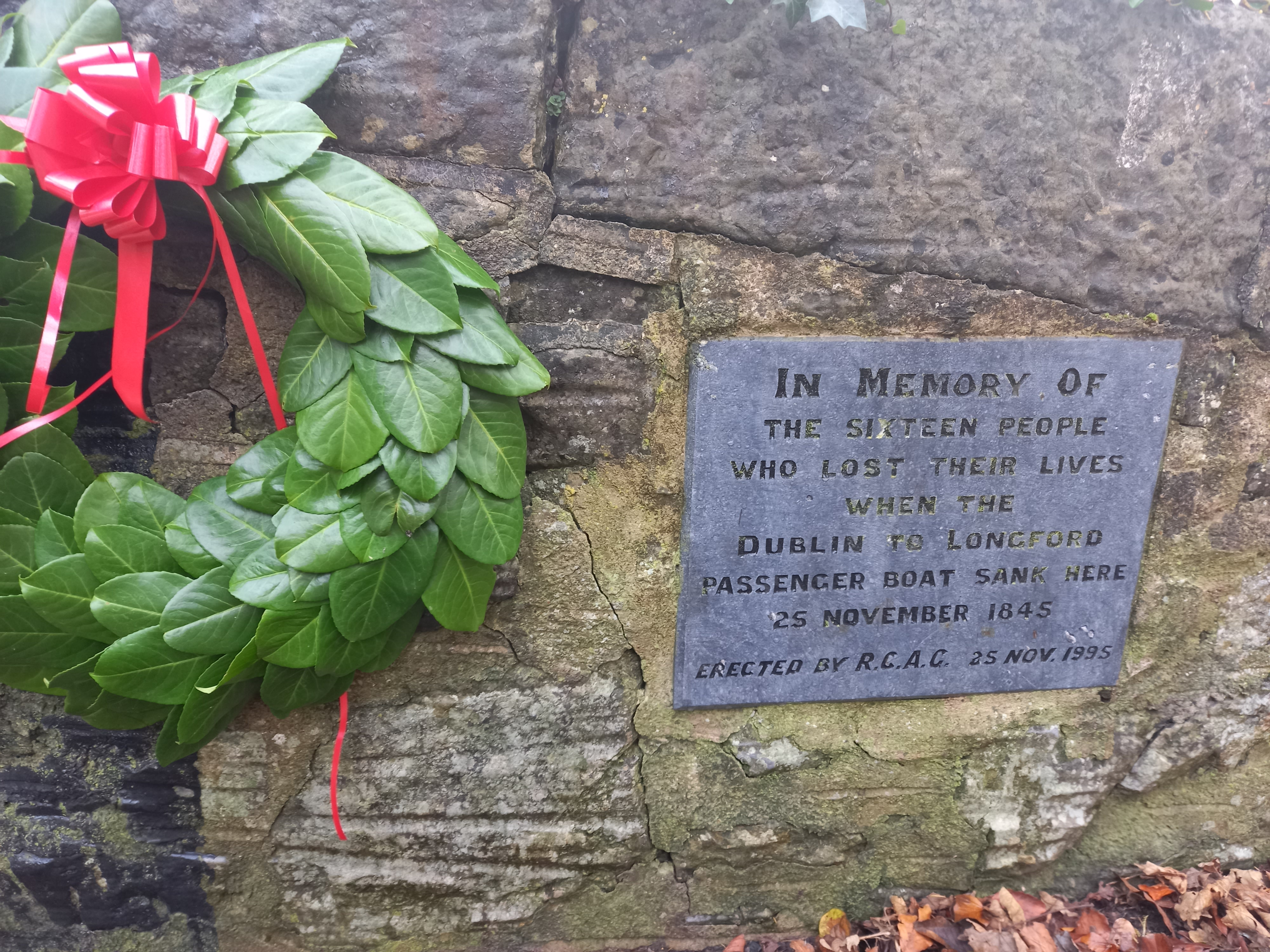
The 1995 memorial plaque at Kennan Bridge commemorating the incident (Note the incorrect listing of 16 victims, as opposed to 15)

On 25 November 1995, the 150th anniversary of the incident, a memorial plaque was set into the wall of Kennan Bridge by the RCAG (Royal Canal Amenity Group).

Each November since at least 2015, the Royal Canal Amenity Group organise a memorial mass around the date for those who lost their lives in the accident. In 2021, the mass took place at St. Mochta's Church in Porterstown on Friday 26 November, after which a wreath was laid at the memorial plaque on Kennan Bridge.

Talks are occasionally given on the tragedy by local history groups. Frank O'Connor, chairperson of the Blanchardstown-Castleknock History Society, gave such a talk at Blanchardstown library in June 2022.

== See also ==
- In December 1792, 11 people drowned in the Grand Canal near Clondalkin when a boat capsized en route from Dublin to Athy
- The Carrick-on-Suir barge disaster of 1799, which remains as of 2026, the worst known loss-of-life incident to have occurred on Irish inland waterways, claiming the lives of approximately 91 people
- The drowning tragedy at Lough Corrib in 1828
- The Great Irish Famine (1845–1852), a wider calamity affecting Ireland at the time of the Longford tragedy
- Paisley canal disaster, 1810

== Sources ==
- Clarke, Peter (17 February 1993). "The Royal Canal 1789-1993". Dublin Historical Record. 46 (1). Dublin: Old Dublin Society: 46–52. JSTOR 30101021.
- Delaney, Ruth (1 March 1980). "The Grand Canal". Dublin Historical Record. 33 (2). Dublin: Old Dublin Society: 73–76. JSTOR 30104183.
- Fingal County Council, The (1 January 2011). Fingal Industrial Heritage Survey (Phase 1: Desktop Survey) (PDF). Dublin: Fingal County Council.
- Goodbody, Rob (1 June 2022). "EIAR. Volume 4. Appendix A21.4 - Conservation Report" (PDF). dartplus.ie. DART+ West.
- Hall, Mr. & Mrs. S. C. (1 January 1843). Ireland: Its Scenery, Character, &c. How and Parsons. p. 276 – via Internet Archive.
- Shepherd, W. Ernest (1994). The Midland Great Western Railway of Ireland: An Illustrated History. Leicester: Midland Publishing. ISBN 1-85780-008-7.
- Watson Stewart, John (1830). Watson's, or the Gentleman's and Citizen's Almanack, (as Compiled by the late John Watson Stewart,) For the Year of our Lord 1830 (PDF). Dublin: Stewart and Hopes, Stationers, No 3, King's-Inns-Quay, opposite Richmond Bridge.
