= Rainey-Skarland Cabin =

- U.S. National Register of Historic Places
- Alaska Heritage Resources Survey
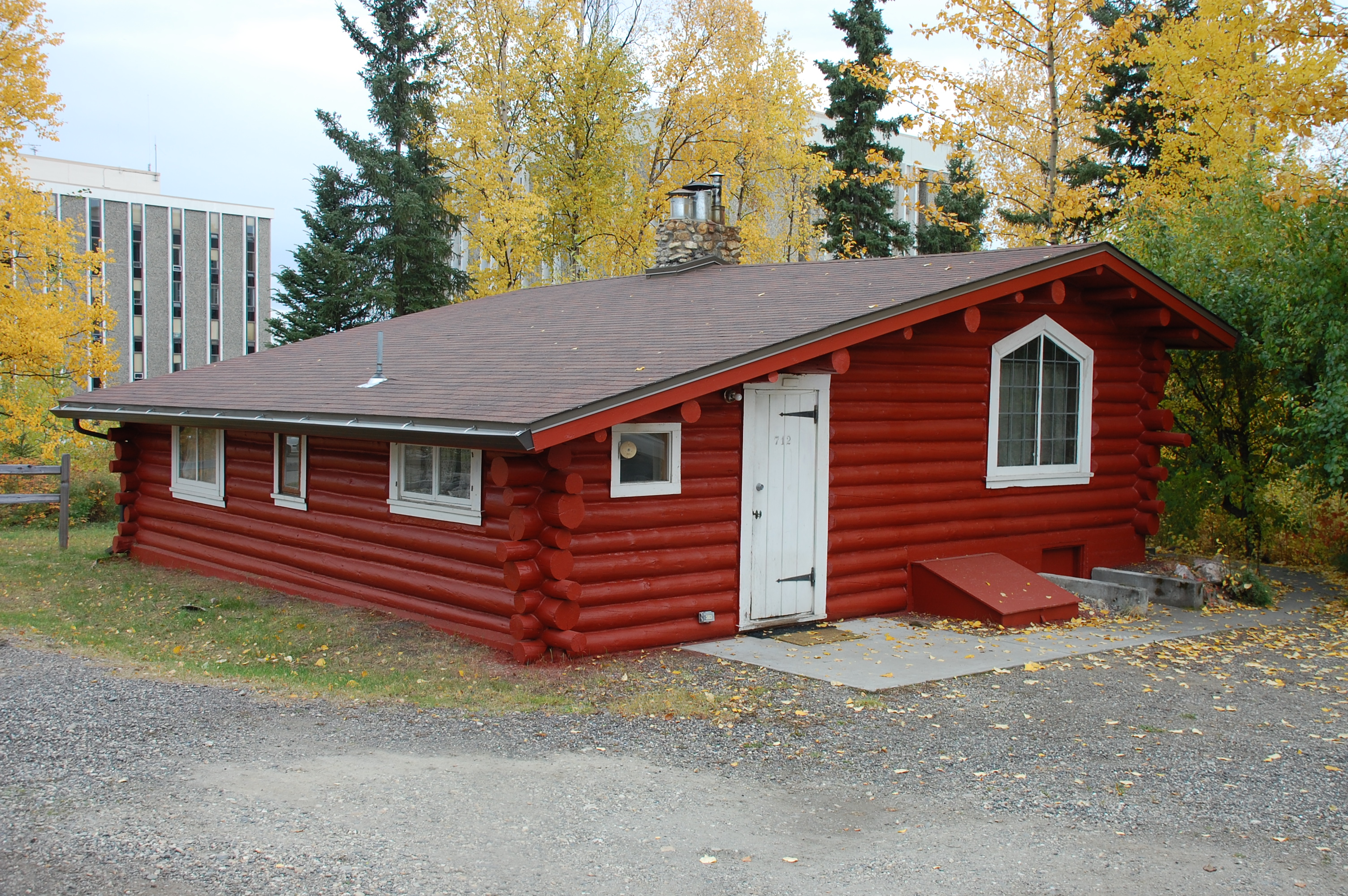

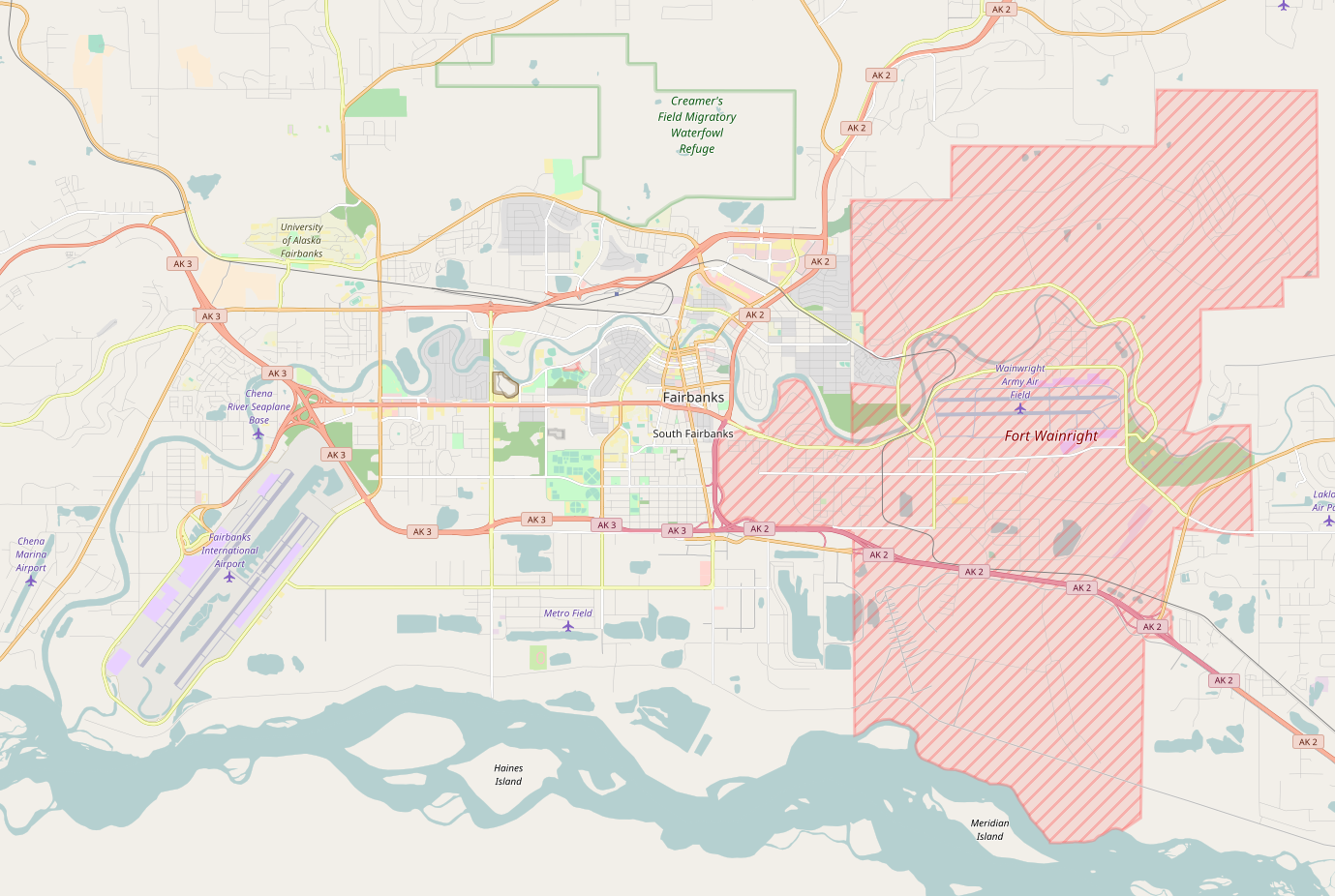
- Location within Fairbanks Location within Alaska
- Location: University of Alaska Fairbanks campus, College, Alaska
- Coordinates: 64°51′32″N 147°49′54″W
- Area: 0.1 acres (0.040 ha)
- Built: 1936
- Built by: T.S. Batchelder; Froelich Rainey
- Architectural style: log cabin
- NRHP reference No.: 75002158
- AHRS No.: FAI-084
- Added to NRHP: November 20, 1975

Rainey-Skarland Cabin, also known as Rainey's Cabin, Skarland's Cabin and Ivar's Cabin, is a historic log cabin on the campus of the University of Alaska Fairbanks in College, Alaska. A single-story three-room log structure with massive stone fireplace on one gable end, it is used today as extended lodging for a permanent or visiting anthropology faculty member or student.

== History ==
The cabin was built in 1936 on a ridge overlooking the school for Froelich Rainey, the first professor of the university's Anthropology Department. During his tenure the cabin played a significant role as a social center of the university, hosting a number of pioneering archaeologists and anthropologists, including J. Louis Giddings and Frederica de Laguna. When Rainey left in 1942 the university bought the cabin to use as faculty housing.

Beginning in the late 1940s it was occupied by a successor as department chairman, former student Ivar Skarland, who continued Rainey's social practices.

Upon Skarland's sudden death in 1965, university students requested that the cabin, ski trails, and a residence hall be named in his memory, resulting in the Rainey-Skarland Cabin. Today, a permanent or visiting anthropology faculty member or student lives there.

The building was placed on the National Register of Historic Places in 1975. A major 1982 renovation was highlighted by roof replacement, insulation, and installation of an alarm system.

== See also ==
- National Register of Historic Places listings in Fairbanks North Star Borough, Alaska
