= Yassi Ada =

Island in Turkey

Coordinates: 36°45′11″N 27°45′49″E

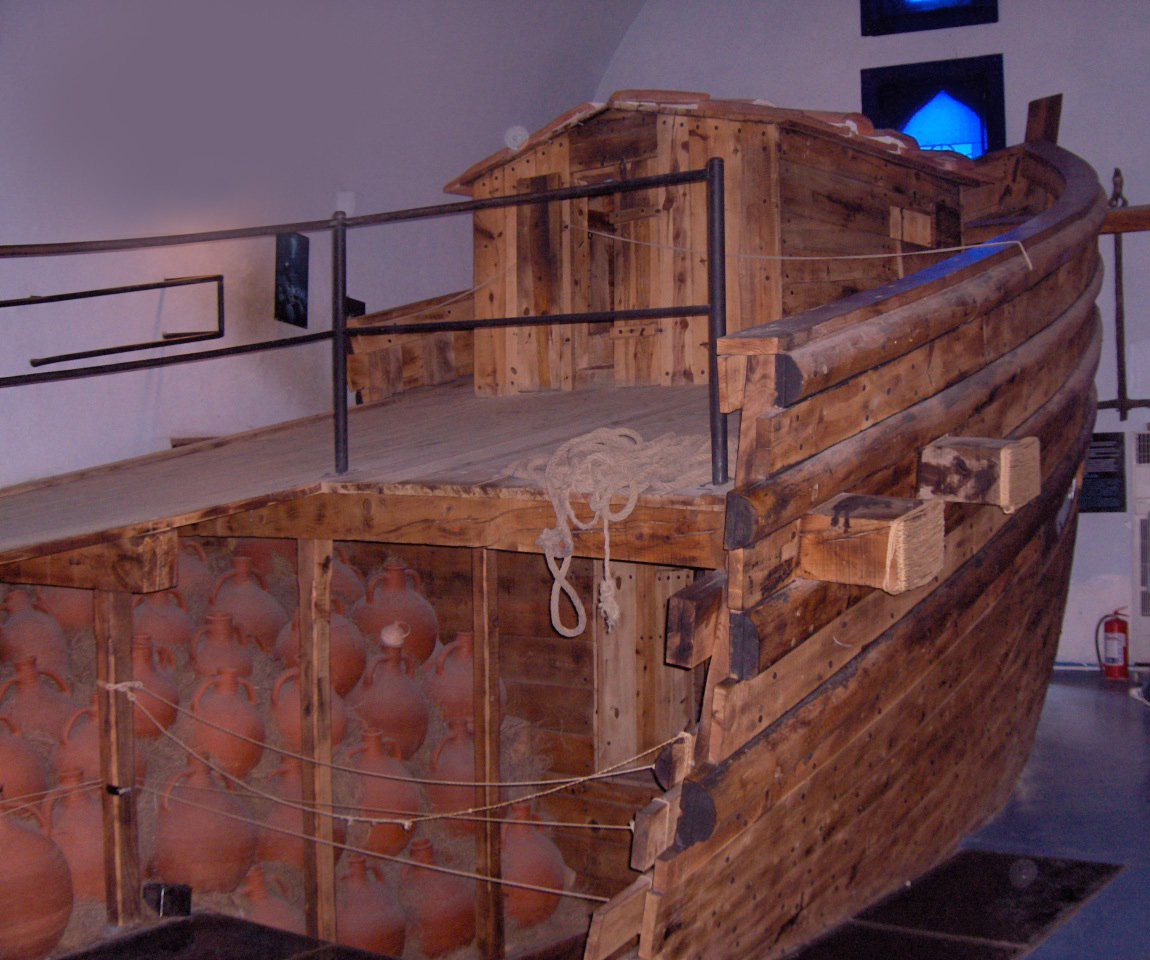
- Reconstruction of 7th-century shipwreck at Yassi Ada, displayed at Bodrum Castle

History
- Name: 7th-century wreck at Yassi Ada
- Owner: Byzantine Empire
- In service: 625/626 AD or later
- Identification: Byzantine
- Fate: Sunk

General characteristics
- Depth: 106-129 feet (32-39 m)
- Notes: Ship hull length: 21 m or 69 ft; Ship found by: Kanal Aras; Number of amphora discovered:900; Number of dives during excavations:3,533; Cost of excavation expeditions:$95,000

Yassi Ada is an island off the coast of Bodrum, Turkey. This area of the Mediterranean Sea is prone to strong winds, making a safe journey around the island difficult. The island could be called a ships' graveyard, on account of the number of wrecked ships off its southeastern tip. Three wreck sites have been excavated under the direction of George Bass of Texas A&M University. The first to be studied using archaeological techniques was a 4th-century Byzantine wreck, the second a 7th-century Byzantine wreck, and the third a 16th-century Ottoman wreck. Bass received funding for a summer excavation at the site from the University Museum of the University of Pennsylvania and the National Geographic Society.

== Description ==
Yassi Ada is an island situated between Turgutreis and the Greek island of Pserimos. It measures 200 metres by 150 metres, with an elevation of 11 metres. Approximately 200 metres southwest of the island is a dangerous reef that has caught many sailors unawares. The ruins of several vessels that crashed into the hidden reef can be found there, representing a range of periods and styles. Ship material is sometimes visible on top of the reef, since it rises three metres above the surface of the water.

== Fieldwork ==
The University Museum of the University of Pennsylvania under its director George Bass excavated a shipwreck site near Yassi Ada in 1967 and 1969. This expedition was funded by the Museum and the National Geographic Society. A few students from the university joined the team, along with an architect and a physician. The main site under excavation was a 4th-century vessel 19 metres in length, lying between 36 and 42 metres below the sea surface 100 metres south of Yassi Ada. Its hull was made of cypress, and the keel of white oak. There is also a 7th-century vessel near the reef, with one end resting over another wrecked vessel. Bass used the mini-sub Asherah to conduct some of the investigation of the site.

== Dating method ==
Artifacts discovered at the main site included lamps, whose shapes were used to date the wreck. The vessel's mode of construction also helped to date the wreck site. The vessel was determined to be from the 4th century.

== Archaeological Finds ==
Finds from the site include 1,100 amphorae in three different styles. The first style has a well-fired texture, is reddish-brown in color, and is estimated to hold 37–40 litres. The second is similar in pattern and design to the first, but its body is more cylindrical. The third style, the smallest, is estimated to hold 13.7–14.4 litres. Its base is round, with a button in the centre. The color is orange-brown.

== Byzantine trade history ==
Trade with the East became important to acquire materials that were seen as necessities in the Byzantine Empire. This Empire had three main trade routes, ranging from the quickest to the safest. The quickest route took sailors through Sogdiana to Persia and thence to the Empire. The second quickest route went from the Indian Ocean to the Red Sea. The third route was the longest and safest. The Byzantine Empire often had conflicts with Persia, so this route bypassed Persian land to prevent Byzantine ships from being sunk or attacked. It went from Central Asia through the Caspian Sea to the Black Sea, avoiding all contact with Persia. Some caravans loaded with silk did, however, pass through Persia to reach the Empire. Trade with Persians was risky because of the "frequent wars between Byzantine and Persia ... Roman commerce suffered heavily both through the interpretation of communication and through the raising of the price of raw material". In towns at war with Persia, the price for raw materials was high, and the finished product cost more than in other cities. In the 6th century, the Empire obtained sandalwood, aloes, and silk from Ceylon, as trade with India and Ethiopia was the main business in this part of the world. During this time, the Empire also traded for copper in Kalliana; raw material and labor came from the north.

Though the Empire saw difficult times in the 7th century, trade continued. Food, commodities, and other items were sold at a fixed price to prevent rivals to the ruler and government, as specified in the first part of the constitution, which also allowed citizens to purchase basic necessities at a reasonable and affordable price. Another part sought to protect producers by eliminating a vertical monopoly. Work was divided equally amongst all members, providing for a low competition rate. The third part of the constitution claims that private producers receive aid only from family members, although some might also have slaves to help in the business. Such businesses sold directly to customers, and they had fewer customers than other markets. The private producer produced items for himself and his family.

During this time, Constantinople especially continued trade with Africa, while other Alexandrian ships began to reach places as far west as Britain. The Empire had laws on trade and sailing. One of them. which grew out of the custom of marine regulation, restricted ships to sailing in the winter months. Sailing was later suspended for four months between November and March because of dangers such as pirates, land-based robbers, and ships being set on fire. Byzantine ships would sail together to give aid to each other, and they began to carry armed men for further protection. Another law declares that money lent for a vessel does not have to be returned if that vessel is lost or destroyed. The Byzantine Empire had a vast network of trade routes, and the government issued laws to protect merchants and businesses by providing route options for safety and protection.

== Bibliography ==
- Bass, George F and van Doornick, Frederick H. Jr. 1971 A Fourth-Century Shipwreck at Yassi Ada. Archaeological Institute of America 75.1:27-37.
- Bass, George F and van Doornick, Frederick H. Jr. 1982 Yassi Ada: a Seventh- Century Byzantine Shipwreck. Texas A & M University Press, Texas.
- Baynes, Norman H. 1925 The Byzantine Empire. Oxford University Press, London.
- Browing, Robert 1975 Byzantium and Bulgaria. Temple Smith, London.
- Institute of Nautical Archaeology. Yassiada Tektas 4th-century, Turkey. Electronic document, http://www.inadiscover.com/projects/all/southern_europe_mediterranean_aegean/yassiada, accessed May 21, 2011.
- Moran, Daniel 2004 Gunpowder and Galleys: Changing Technology and Mediterranean Warfare at Sea in the 16th Century. Strategic Insights 3:3.
