= George Bass (archaeologist) =

American pioneer of underwater archaeology (1932–2021)

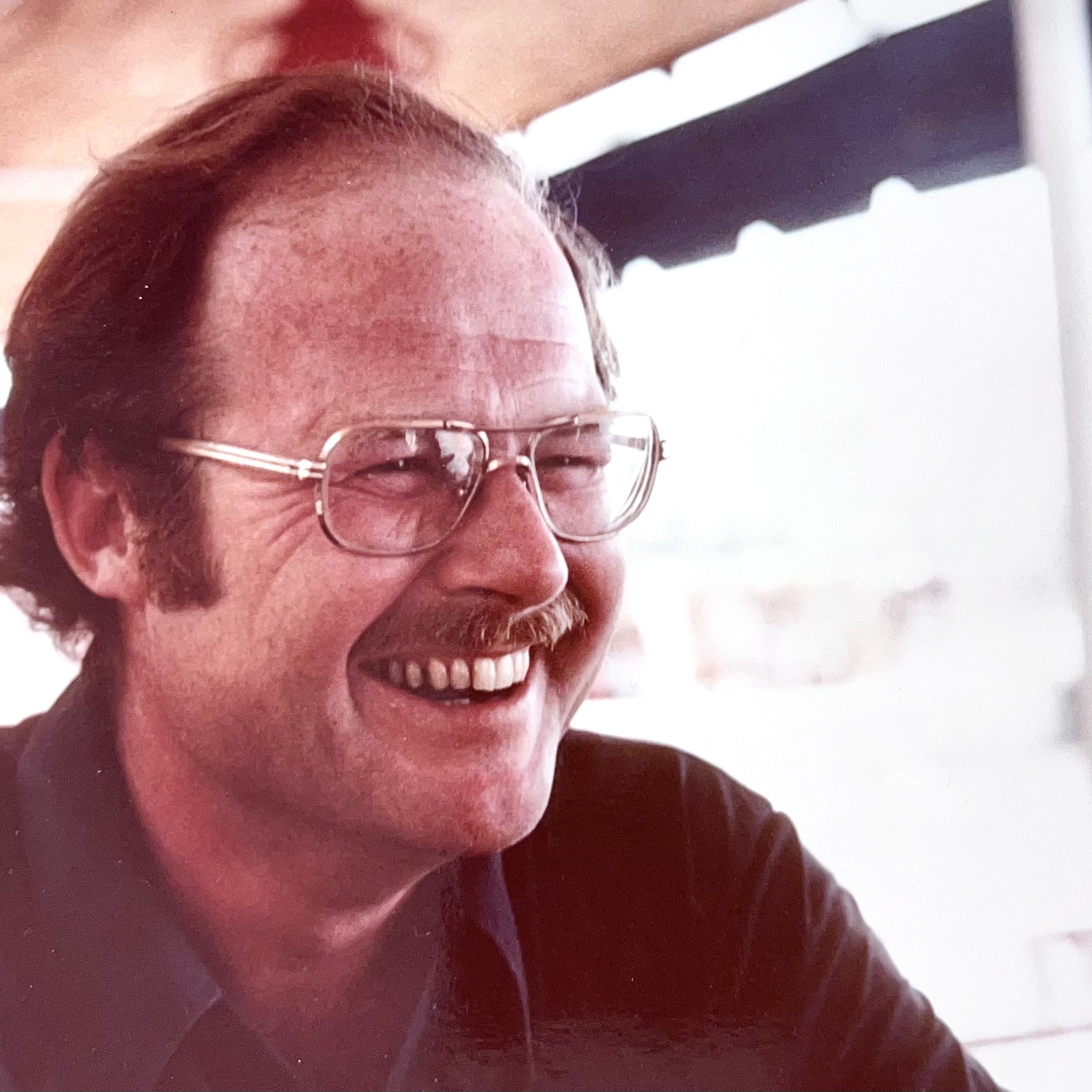
- Born: December 9, 1932; Columbia, South Carolina
- Died: March 2, 2021 (aged 88); Bryan, Texas
- Education: Johns Hopkins University; University of Pennsylvania
- Children: 2
- Awards: National Medal of Science
- Scientific career
- Fields: underwater archaeology
- Workplaces: Texas A&M University

George Fletcher Bass (/bæs/; December 9, 1932 – March 2, 2021) was an American archaeologist. An early practitioner of underwater archaeology, he co-directed the first expedition to entirely excavate an ancient shipwreck at Cape Gelidonya in 1960 and founded the Institute of Nautical Archaeology in 1972.

== Early life and education ==
Bass was born on December 9, 1932, in Columbia, South Carolina to Robert Duncan Bass, an English Literature professor and scholar of the American Revolutionary War, and Virginia Wauchope, a writer. His uncle was the archaeologist Robert Wauchope. In 1940 Bass moved with his family to Annapolis, Maryland, where his father took up active service with the US Navy in World War II and taught English at the United States Naval Academy. He was interested in both astronomy and the sea as a youth and did odd jobs for Ben Carlin, an adventurer who was the first person to circumnavigate the world in an amphibious vehicle.

After graduating high school, he began studying for an English major at Johns Hopkins University; during his second year he did an exchange trip to England, attending what is now the University of Exeter, from which he was suspended along with forty other students for pulling a prank. With nowhere else to go he accompanied his brother's roommate and his friends on a spring break trip to Taormina, Sicily, where he first became interested in archaeology as a career.

On returning to Johns Hopkins he switched majors and in 1955 he received an M.A. in Near Eastern Archaeology from the university, which improvised a major for him out of courses from the Near Eastern and Classics departments because they did not have an archaeology department. He then spent two years at the American School of Classical Studies at Athens, where he excavated at Gordion. He began military service in 1957, assigned in South Korea to a 30-man army security group which was attached to the Turkish Brigade near the Korean Demilitarized Zone. Operating around rice paddies he was suddenly responsible for equipment, food, logistics, and operations which was a formative learning experience for future archeology expeditions.

In 1960 he married Ann Bass (née Singletary), a pianist and piano teacher, who assisted him with his work. The couple had two sons.

== Academic career ==
In 1959 Professor Rodney Young, Bass's colleague at the University of Pennsylvania, had learned about an unspoiled Bronze-Age Mediterranean shipwreck site from diver and journalist Peter Throckmorton. Young invited Bass to work on the first expedition to entirely excavate an ancient shipwreck. Excavation of the wrecksite, off the Turkish coast near Cape Gelidonya, began in the summer of 1960. In preparation, Bass took diving lessons at YMCA Philadelphia; he could take only one practical diving lesson before the excavation began. Bass became the co-director, alongside Joan du Plat Taylor, of the expedition.

During the 1960s he excavated shipwrecks of the Bronze Age, Classical Age, and the Byzantine. In 1964 he received a Ph.D in Classical Archaeology from the University of Pennsylvania, where he was a faculty member for several years.

In 1966, Froelich Rainey, director of the University of Pennsylvania Museum of Archaeology and Anthropology, authorized Bass to write a report on the Penn Museum's controversial accession of a set of gold objects believed to have come from the site of Troy, in what is now Turkey. The museum had purchased the gold from a private antiquities dealer. Bass, who at the time was assistant curator in the Mediterranean Section, wrote a report which influenced the museum's articulation of a statement on museum ethics. This was the Pennsylvania Declaration of 1970, which anticipated UNESCO's subsequent issue of the 1970 Convention on the Means of Prohibiting and Preventing the Illicit Import, Export, and Transfer of Ownership and Cultural Property.

As an innovator, Bass adapted traditional land-based archaeological surveying techniques to the seabed and contributed to key technological advances, such as an underwater "telephone booth" in which divers could communicate with the surface; 3D photogrammetry to better map sites; and the use of side-scan sonar to locate wrecks. In 1964 he began using the Asherah, the first commercially built American research submersible, to examine and photograph shipwrecks.

In 1972 Bass founded the Institute of Nautical Archaeology (INA); he left the University of Pennsylvania the following year.In 1976 INA moved its headquarters to Texas A&M University, where Bass became a professor and held the George T. and Gladys H. Abell Chair in Nautical Archaeology.

Bass was awarded the National Medal of Science in 2001 for "pioneering ocean technology and creating a new branch of scholarship, nautical archaeology, thereby providing new knowledge of the histories of economics, technology, and literacy." The award was presented by President George W. Bush.

He died on March 2, 2021, in a hospital in Bryan, Texas, aged 88.

== Awards and honors ==
- Archaeological Institute of America's Gold Medal for Distinguished Archaeological Achievement (1986)
- Elected member of the American Philosophical Society (1989)
- Explorers Club Lowell Thomas Award
- National Geographic Society La Gorce Gold Medal
- National Geographic Society Centennial Award
- J. C. Harrington Medal (1999) from the Society for Historical Archaeology
- Honorary doctorate from Boğaziçi University in Istanbul
- Honorary doctorate from the University of Liverpool
- Golden Plate Award of the American Academy of Achievement (2001)
- National Medal of Science (2001)
- Lucy Wharton Drexel Medal for Achievement in Archaeology (2010) from the University of Pennsylvania
- Elected member of the American Academy of Arts and Sciences (2012)

== Interviews ==
Bass was interviewed by Adam Davidson with colleague Fred van Doorninck on This American Life in 2010.

== Books ==
- Beneath the Seven Seas : Adventures with the Institute of Nautical Archaeology by George Fletcher Bass (London : Thames & Hudson, 2005) ISBN 0-500-05136-4, OCLC 60667939
- Archaeology Under Water by George Fletcher Bass (New York, Praeger, 1966), OCLC 387479
- Archaeology Beneath the Sea by George Fletcher Bass (New York : Walker, 1975) ISBN 0-8027-0477-8, OCLC 1414901
- Ancient ships in Bodrum by George Fletcher Bass (Istanbul: Boyut, 2012) ISBN 9789752310315, OCLC 880980693
- A History of Seafaring Based on Underwater Archaeology by George Fletcher Bass (New York, Walker, 1972) ISBN 0802703909, OCLC 508334
- Ships and Shipwrecks of the Americas: a history based on underwater archaeology by George Fletcher Bass (New York, N.Y. : Thames and Hudson, 1988) ISBN 0-500-05049-X, OCLC 18759167
- Cape Gelidonya: a Bronze Age Shipwreck by George Fletcher Bass (Philadelphia, American Philosophical Society, 1967), OCLC 953382
- Navi e Civiltà : Archeologia Marina by George Fletcher Bass (Milano : Fratelli Fabri, 1974), OCLC 8201972
- Yassi Ada by George Fletcher Bass and Frederick H Van Doorninck (College Station : Published with the cooperation of the Institute of Nautical Archaeology by Texas A&M University Press, ©1982) ISBN 0-89096-063-1, OCLC 7925092
- Geschiedenis van de scheepvaart weerspiegeld in de scheepsarcheologie by George Fletcher Bass (Bussum : Unieboek, 1973) ISBN 90-228-1908-6, OCLC 64115385
- Serce Limani, vol. 1: the ship and its anchorage, crew, and passengers by George Fletcher Bass and others (College Station: Published with the cooperation of the Institute of Nautical Archaeology by Texas A&M University Press, 2004) ISBN 0-89096-947-7, OCLC 56457232
- Beneath the wine dark sea : nautical archaeology and the Phoenicians of the Odyssey by George F Bass, OCLC 41174856
- A diversified program for the study of shallow water searching and mapping techniques by George F Bass; Donald M Rosencrantz; United States Dept. of Navy, Office of Naval Research; University of Pennsylvania, University Museum (Philadelphia, Pa.: The University Museum, University of Pennsylvania, 1968), OCLC 61423407
- Glass treasure from the Aegean by George Fletcher Bass (Washington: National Geographic Society, 1978), OCLC 13594255
- Shipwrecks in the Bodrum Museum of Underwater Archaeology by George Fletcher Bass and Bodrum Sualtı Arkeoloji Müzesi (Bodrum : Museum of Underwater Archaeology, 1996) ISBN 975-17-1605-5, OCLC 35759537
- New tools for undersea archeology by George Fletcher Bass (v. 134, no. 3 (Sept. 1968) (Washington, D.C. : National Geographic Society, ©1968), OCLC 57758351
- Archäologie unter Wasser by George Fletcher Bass (Bergisch Gladbach: Lübbe, 1966), OCLC 73584270
- Marine archaeology: a misunderstood science by George Fletcher Bass (Chicago and London: The University of Chicago Press, ©1980), OCLC 13598481
- Tesori in fondo al mare by George Fletcher Bass (Milano: Sonzogno, 1981), OCLC 46996362
