= Asherah (submarine) =

American research submarine

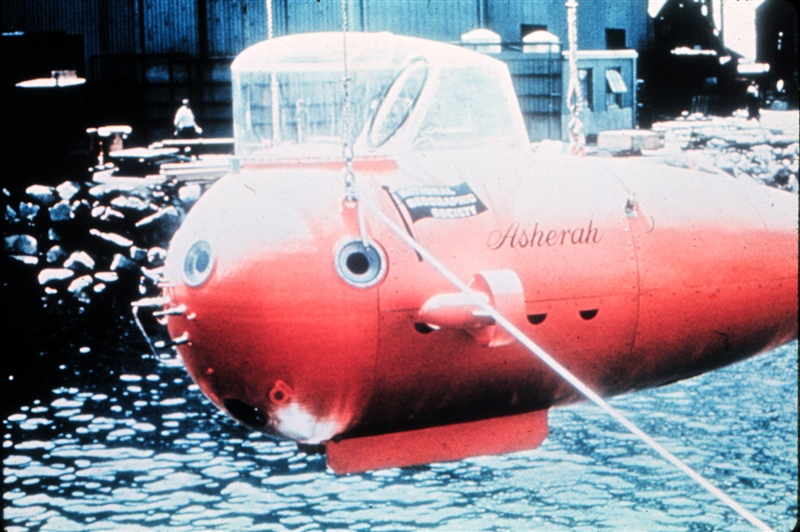
- Asherah

History
- Name: Asherah
- Namesake: Asherah
- Ordered: 1963
- Builder: General Dynamics, Groton, Connecticut
- Launched: 1964

General characteristics
- Type: Submersible
- Test depth: 600 feet (180 m)
- Crew: 2

Asherah was the first commercially built American research submersible, owned by the University of Pennsylvania and used by archaeologist George F. Bass to examine underwater sites. She was named after Asherah, an ancient Semitic goddess known as "she who treads on the sea".

== Development and design ==
The two-person submarine was commissioned in 1963, built by the Electric Boat Division of General Dynamics in Groton, Connecticut, and launched on May 28, 1964. Asherah was 16 feet long, weighed 4.5 tons, and could move at up to 4 knots, powered by rechargeable batteries. She could dive to a depth of 600 feet (180 m).

== Archaeological use ==
Asherah was used to search for and map wrecks. She was also used to develop a new system of stereoscopy, allowing an excavation site to be mapped in three dimensions, and allowed Bass to become the first to use side-scanning sonar to locate a shipwreck.

In 1967, under Bass' direction, Asherah was used to photograph an ancient Byzantine shipwreck at a depth of 285 feet near Yassi Ada island, off the coast of Turkey.

While Asherah proved useful for identifying and mapping wrecks, her overall utility was limited by factors including a lack of navigation equipment, limited visibility from her six portholes, and complex operation. This, coupled with an insurance premium that approached $10,000 in 1969, led to her sale by the University of Pennsylvania that year and the end of her use by Bass.

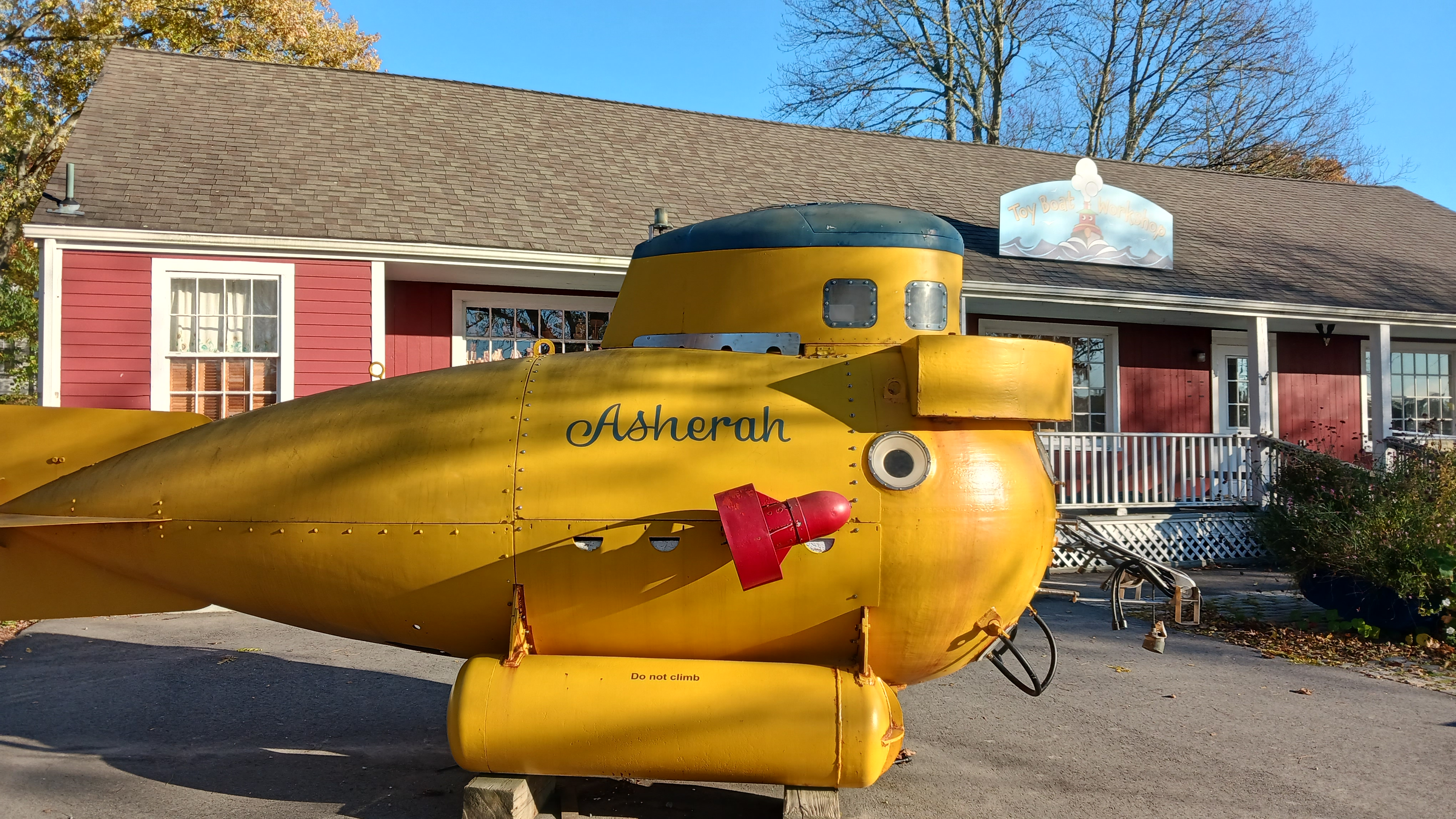

== Museum display ==
Asherah was donated to the Mystic Seaport Museum, where she is currently on display, in 2025.
