= Pennsylvania Declaration =

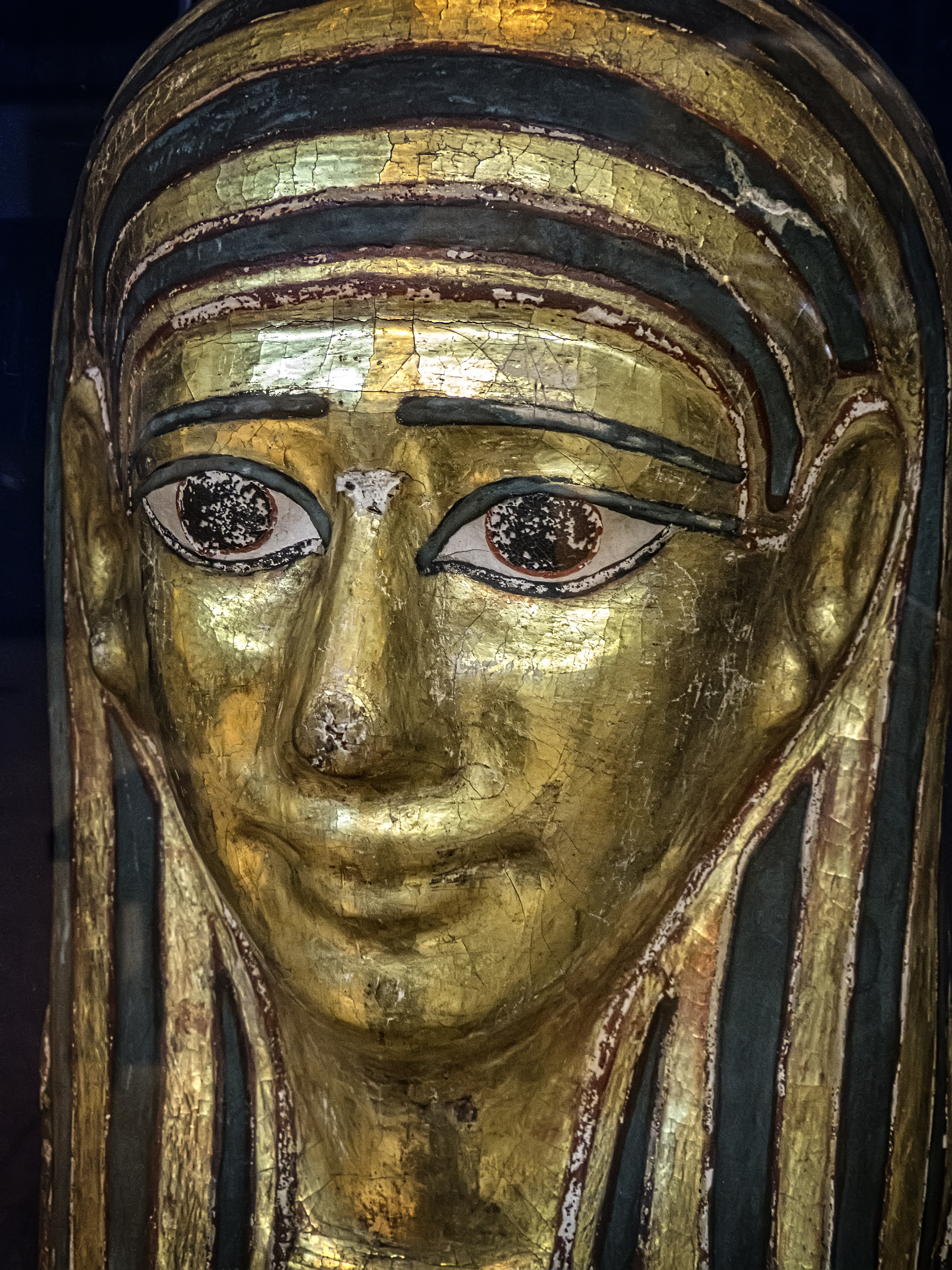
Gilded funerary mask, Egypt, Ptolemaic or Roman period (post-300 BCE), Penn Museum

The Pennsylvania Declaration was a statement of ethics issued by the University of Pennsylvania Museum of Archaeology and Anthropology on April 1, 1970. It affirmed that the Penn Museum would no longer acquire objects that lacked provenance or collection histories. The declaration aimed to distinguish the Penn Museum's collection practices from illegal antiquity trading while maintaining trust with countries where the university engaged in field research. This declaration marked the first time that a museum had taken formal steps to guarantee the ethical acquisition of materials and to deter looting and illicit antiquities trading. Froelich Rainey, director of the Penn Museum, presented the declaration at the meeting of the United Nations Educational, Scientific, and Cultural Organization (UNESCO), in conjunction with the issue of its treaty known as the 1970 Convention on the Means of Prohibiting and Preventing the Illicit Import, Export and Transfer of Ownership of Cultural Property.

== Background ==
The Penn Museum was established in 1887 to house artifacts from archaeological and anthropological expeditions which the University of Pennsylvania sponsored around the world. Before World War II, when many countries still allowed the exportation of newly excavated archaeological materials, Penn acquired large collections in the course of these excavations. Penn Museum excavations are well-documented, and the Penn Museum Archives now preserve extensive records associated with them.

Aside from acquiring materials through excavations, the Penn Museum also received objects from donors and through purchase from private collectors. In 1966, the Penn Museum bought a collection of gold believed to be from the site of Troy, now in Turkey; the seller was George Allen, a private antiquities dealer. Museum directors tasked underwater archaeologist George Bass, assistant curator of the Mediterranean Section, with writing a report on the collection. However, the objects lacked archaeological records and Bass was only able to make tentative suppositions based on their physical properties. Bass and the rest of the curation team at the museum concluded that collecting objects of this nature would undermine the credibility and development of archaeological scholarship and threaten future field research. The curators agreed to stop collecting objects without collection histories and archaeological records – without clear provenance – while the university was still sponsoring expeditions in the field. Against this context, and determined to set policy, Penn Museum director Froelich Rainey worked with colleagues to develop the Pennsylvania Declaration.

== UNESCO and the Pennsylvania Declaration ==
In 1969, UNESCO had invited Froelich Rainey, in his capacity as director of the Penn Museum, to aid in drafting the Convention on the Means of Prohibiting and Preventing the Illicit Import, Export and Transfer of Ownership of Cultural Property. Rainey had hoped to “establish a ‘uniform antiquities law’ throughout the world”. He accepted the offer to participate. During preliminary deliberations with other members of the UNESCO team, however, Rainey realized that the UNESCO convention would lack legal accountability and would not suffice in ending looting, regulating the importation of cultural material, and providing guidelines for legal trade. This realization influenced his decision to draft the separate Pennsylvania Declaration.

Although the United States government committed to follow UNESCO's 1970 Convention, its terms were not incorporated into U.S. law until 1983, with the Convention on Cultural Property Implementation Act. After 1970, t account for gaps in legal implementation, private and public organizations revised, developed, and clarified policies regarding illegal antiquities.

== Subsequent Efforts and Revisions ==
The International Council of Museums adopted a policy later in 1970 outlining an "Ethics of Acquisition" stating that "there must be a full, clear and satisfactory documentation in relation to the origin of any object to be acquired whether the object is classified as a work of art or an object of archaeology, ethnology, or of national and natural history”. Within the decade, related organizations followed suit by issuing similar policies and updates. These emendations included the “1970 resolution of the AIA, the 1971 resolution of the SAA, the 1972 resolution of the American Anthropological Association, the 1973 Joint Professional Policy on Museum Acquisitions of the American Association of Museums (AAM), and the joint 1973 resolution of the International Council of Museums (ICOM) Committee on Ethnography and the International Union of Anthropological and Ethnological Sciences.” Among individual museums, for example, the Field Museum of Natural History in Chicago and Harvard University adopted comparable policies in 1971.

In 1978, the Penn Museum issued a policy to build on the Pennsylvania Declaration. The new policy stated that the museum would ‘‘’not knowingly acquire, by gift, bequest, exchange or purchase, any materials known or suspected to be illegally exported from their countries of origin; nor will they knowingly support this illegal trade by authenticating or expressing opinions concerning such material and will actively discourage the collection of such material, exhibiting such material in The University Museum, or loaning University Museum objects to exhibitions of illegally acquired objects in other museums." The Penn Museum also reserved the right to refuse to loan objects to museums or other institutions suspected of having knowingly violated the 1970 Convention.”
