= Porterstown =

Townland in County Dublin, Ireland

Coordinates: 53.3767°N 6.4038°W

Luttrellstown Road, Porterstown

Porterstown (Irish: Baile an Phóirtéaraigh) is a townland in the civil parish of Castleknock in County Dublin, Ireland.

== History ==
Porterstown Bridge, also known as Kennan Bridge, over the Royal Canal

Evidence of ancient settlement in Porterstown townland includes a ringfort site which was excavated in 1990. The Calendar of Archbishop Alen's Register records an "Adam Portere" as occupying lands in the area in the early 14th century. John Thomas Troy, who was Archbishop of Dublin from 1786 to 1823, was born in the area in 1739. Kennan Bridge, a road bridge over the Royal Canal in Porterstown townland, was completed c. 1800. A plaque on the bridge commemorates the 1845 Royal Canal disaster. St Mochta's Catholic Church, completed c. 1890, is in the Catholic parish of Porterstown-Clonsilla in the Archdiocese of Dublin.

== Proposed railway station ==
A transport interchange has previously been proposed for the Porterstown area. The proposed project was intended to form an interchange between heavy rail services operated by Iarnród Éireann and light rail operations on the proposed Dublin Metro's Metro West line. If built as proposed, the station would be located on the Maynooth Line and would have Irish Rail Commuter services operating to Mullingar and Navan. Some initial designs for the Metro West project, a proposed light rail operation, included a possible station at Porterstown that presumed it would be built on an elevated section over the railway line adjacent to the Royal Canal near Luttrellstown Community College. The Metro West line was indefinitely postponed in late 2011, was not included in the Transport Strategy For The Greater Dublin Area of 2016, and described as "halted completely" as of 2021.
