= What in the World? (game show) =

1951 to 1965 television quiz show

External videos
- What In The World?, 1952, University of Pennsylvania Museum of Archaeology and Anthropology

What in the World? is a 1951 to 1965 television quiz show hosted by Dr. Froelich Rainey in which the scholar-contestants tried to identify artefacts. The objects were primarily archaeological in nature, but also consisted of fossils, ethnographic items and more. It premiered on October 7, 1951 on CBS. The first, and one of the most successful shows of its type, it confounded critics by running for 15 years and influenced successors such as the BBC's Animal, Vegetable, Mineral? and others. The music of the opening and closing was taken from Ottorino Respighi's "Fountains of Rome" featuring the dissonant beginning of the Fontana de Tritone section. The music accompanying the beginning of each segment, with the artefact to be discussed emerging mysteriously from a cloud of smoke, was taken from a variety of sources, usually 20th century compositions such as Stravinsky's "The Rite of Spring" or Debussy's "Syrinx" (solo flute).

What in the World? won a Peabody Award in 1951.

== Cast ==
The host, Dr. Froelich Rainey, was a museum archaeologist and director of the Museum of Archaeology and Anthropology at the University of Pennsylvania. He was accompanied by a panel of three consisting of Dr. Carlton Coon and Dr. Cammann along with a guest star each week. The announcer and hidden voice was Barry Cassell of WCAU TV Philadelphia.

== Origin ==
The show was filmed and produced in Pennsylvania by Charles Vanda Productions and WCAU Philadelphia, with the first episode airing on October 7, 1951. It ran through most of the 1950s on CBS and was picked up by educational (public) television and continued into the 1960s.

== Modern Offspring ==
In 2010, the University of Pennsylvania Museum of Archaeology and Anthropology had multidisciplinary artist Pablo Helguera create and install a 'What in the World' interactive exhibition at the museum. In addition to the exhibition the museum website offered guests a chance to participate in a modern-day form of the quiz show by featuring a picture of an object or objects and having viewers submit their guesses as to what it is through social media such as Facebook and Twitter.
