= Quiz with Hale =

British TV game show (1946–1947)

- Genre: Game show
- Presented by: Lionel Hale
- Country of origin: United Kingdom
- Original language: English

Production
- Running time: 30 minutes

Original release
- Network: BBC
- Release: 1946 – 1947

Quiz with Hale is a British television game show that aired on the BBC from 1946 to 1947. Presented by Lionel Hale, the 30-minute series invited viewers to play along by marking their own quiz paper with the suggestion that you got 1 mark for a brave try, 2 marks for a near miss and 3 marks for a bullseye.

Page 29 (31 of file) of volume 147 of The Chemist and Druggist says episode telecast 28 December 1946 asked viewers to identify three substances from their Latin labels.

The programme is lost, as methods to record live television were not developed until late 1947, and were used very rarely by the BBC until the mid-1950s, additionally U.K. game shows were usually wiped into the 1980s.
