= Geoffrey Bushnell =

British archaeologist (1903–1978)

Geoffrey Hext Sutherland Bushnell, FBA (31 May 1903 – 26 December 1978) was a British archaeologist.

== Career ==
He was head of the Museum of Archaeology and Anthropology, University of Cambridge 1948–1970 and fellow of Corpus Christi College, Cambridge, since 1963. He was the son of an Anglican clergyman and was educated at Wellington College and Downing College, Cambridge, where he took his BA in Natural Science in 1925, specialising in geology. His interest lay in ancient America and he pursued it by becoming an oil geologist in Ecuador with Anglo-Ecuadorian Oilfields, for whom he worked from 1926 to 1938. His spare-time fieldwork formed the basis of his PhD thesis, awarded in 1948. After serving during the War with the Lincolnshire Regiment and the Royal Engineers, he became in 1948, Curator of Cambridge University's Museum of Archaeology and Ethnology, which he remained until he retired in 1970. He was elected a Fellow of Corpus Christi College in 1963, became Reader in New World Archaeology in 1966, and was elected FBA in 1970. He married Patricia Louise Egerton Bushnell, née Ruck (5 February 1912 – 5 April 2009) in 1936, and they are buried together in the Parish of the Ascension Burial Ground in Cambridge.

== Publications ==
- 1951: Archaeology of the Santa Elena Peninsula, South-West Ecuador
- 1956: Peru (Ancient Peoples and Places)
- 1965: Ancient Arts of the Americas
- 1968: The First Americans
