= Lionel Hale =

English critic, broadcaster and playwright (1909–1977)

- Born: 26 October 1909
- Died: 1 January 1977
- Spouses: Betty Taylor (died 1952); Crystal Pudney

Lionel Ramsay Hale (26 October 1909 – 1 January 1977) was an English critic, broadcaster and playwright.

== Life ==
Hale was born in Beckenham, Kent.

In the 1940s, Hale presented the radio quiz Transatlantic Quiz and an early television quiz show called Quiz with Hale. He made regular appearances on Panorama between 1953 and 1955 as a theatre critic, and was featured as a castaway on the BBC Radio programme Desert Island Discs on 3 January 1958. One of Hale's plays, These Two, ran for a short time (eight days) on Broadway in May, 1934. These Two was a three-act drama set in a flat in London. He was also a frequent contributor to Punch, the British humour magazine.

His wife, Betty Taylor, died in 1952. Their son was the publisher and literary agent James Hale (1946-2003). Lionel subsequently married Crystal Pudney, the daughter of A. P. Herbert.

== Bibliography ==
=== Fiction ===
- A Fleece of Lambs. London: Jonathan Cape, 1961 (novel)

=== Plays ===
- She Passed Through Lorraine: A comedy in three acts (1932)
- These Two: A play in three acts
- The Mocking Bird: An extravagance in three acts (1933)
- Festival Time: A comedy in three acts (1938)
- Gilt and Gingerbread: A comedy in three acts (1960)

=== Nonfiction ===
- The Old Vic 1949-50 (1950)
- Evans Plays: Evans catalogue of acting editions: With synopses (editor)(1956)
