= Froelich Rainey =

American anthropologist (1907–1992)

Froelich Gladstone Rainey
- Born: June 18, 1907; Black River Falls, Wisconsin, U.S.
- Died: October 11, 1992 (aged 85); Cornwall, England
- Education: Yale University
- Scientific career
- Fields: Anthropologist
- Workplaces: University of Alaska (1935–1942), Allied Control Commission for Occupied Germany, University of Pennsylvania, "What in the World?"

Froelich Gladstone Rainey (June 18, 1907 – October 11, 1992) was an American anthropologist and Director of the University of Pennsylvania Museum of Anthropology and Archaeology from 1947 to 1977. Under his leadership, the Penn Museum announced the Pennsylvania Declaration, ending the purchase system of acquiring antiquities and artifacts that had, in practice, encouraged looting from historical sites.

In the early 1950s, Rainey also devised and hosted the popular "What in the World?" television gameshow, which highlighted the museum's collections and involved notable scholars and celebrities of the day. In 1975, in recognition of his role at the University of Alaska Fairbanks, where he had served as the university's first professor of anthropology from 1935 to 1942, Rainey's Cabin on the campus was listed on the National Register of Historic Places.

== Early life ==
Born in Black River Falls, Wisconsin, Rainey grew up in eastern Montana, where he worked as a farm hand for the Rainey Brothers Ranch, otherwise known as the "R-Lazy-B". He began his career in education teaching English in the Philippines, his destination after searching for opportunities after the onset of the Great Depression. He attended Yale University, earning a doctoral degree.

== Career ==
=== Academic ===
Rainey taught at the University of Alaska (1935–1942), specializing in Alaskan prehistory. With the approval of the university, he constructed a home on the campus for his family. Rainey-Skarland cabin, as it is now known, served both as the Rainey family home and a hub for the university's burgeoning Department of Anthropology. The cabin was the subject of a refurbishing project in 2006, led by Professor Craig Gerlach of the anthropology department. During the Second World War, he worked for the United States Board of Economic Warfare. As the war began he assigned as director of the U.S. Quinine Mission in Ecuador. In 1944 he was assigned to Robert Murphy's staff for the Allied Control Commission for Occupied Germany, part of the Foreign Services. After the war he was appointed U.S. Commissioner for the Rhine and faced with the daunting task of rebuilding the Ruhr coal industry.

Later Rainey worked as an archaeologist at the University of Pennsylvania, eventually becoming Director of the University of Pennsylvania Museum, serving from 1947 to 1977. His directorship saw Museum scholars explore the globe on more than two hundred trips, including excursions to Thailand, Guatemala, and Greece. Parallel to his desire to expand the international research agenda at the museum, Rainey was also interested in how archaeological excavations overseas might advance the post-World War II development and foreign policy agendas of the United States government. During the 1950s Rainey organized a number of excavations in Egypt, Turkey, and Afghanistan in conjunction with US State department officials. Further, Rainey was approached by the US State Department to embed members of the CIA in to these excavations in order for them to collect intelligence for the United States.

He hosted the popular television show, "What in the World?", which was aimed at stumping experts as they analyzed archaeological artifacts. Guests included figures like the anthropologist Carleton Coon and the actor and art collector Vincent Price. The show not only highlighted the Penn Museum's collections, but also "brought the museum to the modern era." The educational role that the show took reflected Rainey's own dedication to bringing scholarship to the masses. He sought to break down the wall between museum and patron, utilizing the rise of television's popularity to expand the museum's educational reach. By showing that professionals scholars could also struggle to understand the objects, Rainey broke down the barriers between academia and the everyday. In 1951, the show won the Peabody Award, a prize originally given for invigorating storytelling in radio and television, highlighting its importance and popularity soon after it came on air.

=== Research ===
==== Arctic ====
Rainey's work spanned four continents, but it is his early work in Arctic Alaska which is regarded as his most significant. In September 1936 he arrived in Fairbanks, Alaska after voyaging from Portugal to work with German naturalist Otto Geist. Geist had collected specimens from all across the island and Rainey began his study by sorting and labeling the specimens. Come spring he began "a regular pattern of research: early summer hunting for Athapascan sites in the interior, late summer working on the tundra with Eskimos, and the rest of the time teaching and writing up his collections.

In 1939 Rainey joined forces with Helge Larsen on an expedition to Point Hope, Alaska, a place where in 1920 Knud Rasmussen found what he "thought to be the most interesting site in the American Arctic". In 1939 they were joined by J. Louis Giddings and discovered one of the largest archaeological sites in the Arctic, the Ipiutak site, which became the type site of the Ipiutak culture.

Rainey sought to better understand his and Larsen's findings and returned in 1940 with his wife and daughter for further explorations. At this point his journey led him to join a whaling crew and write what is now a well known ethnography. The value of this ethnography comes from its emphasis on the interrelatedness and combined usefulness of ethnographical and archaeological research". He would return to the Arctic later in his career and write about the differences he saw from his earlier trips there.

=== Publications ===
Rainey participated in the writing of various works that were published and had a large impact on the field of anthropology. One such work is Ipiutak and the Arctic Whale Hunting Culture, which was co-written by Helge Larsen. Their site report remains an archaeological classic that showed the Ipiutak culture to be "of the most enigmatic, both because of its lithic relationships to American Eskimo traditions and because of its tortuous ivory carvings, which bear strong resemblance to the artistic traditions of northeastern and central Asia".

In 1947 he published The Whale Hunters of Tigara, an ethnography that displayed the importance of combining ethnographic and archaeological research and ultimately led to improved relationship and friendship with the Eskimos of Point Hope. Later this contributed to helping anthropologist such as James VanStone, Don Foote, Ernest Burch, and Douglas Anderson continue the research.

Reflections of a Digger: Fifty Years of World Archaeology was published in 1992. The book is the personal memoir of Rainey and outlines how he revived the University of Pennsylvania Museum (following years of contraction that began during the Depression) while highlighting his archaeological experience spanning over 50 years.

== Death ==
On Sunday, October 11, 1992, Rainey died from cancer at age 85 in Cornwall, England.

== Legacy ==
As director of the Penn Museum for almost thirty years, Rainey was central in many initiatives that influenced the museum even in its contemporary form. He founded the museum's publication, Expedition magazine, and was a central force in how museums worldwide understood their own purpose and mission. Furthermore, he oversaw the museum during its announcement of the Pennsylvania Declaration of 1970, which made the University of Pennsylvania a trendsetter in setting ethical policies regarding the acquisition of collections, especially antiquities. The declaration, which committed the Penn Museum to require that all acquisitions be procured in a legal manner with proof of provenance, anticipated UNESCO's issue later in 1970 of the Convention on the Means of Prohibiting and Preventing the Illicit Import, Export and Transfer of Ownership of Cultural Property.
