= Rib (nautical) =

Structural element of watercraft

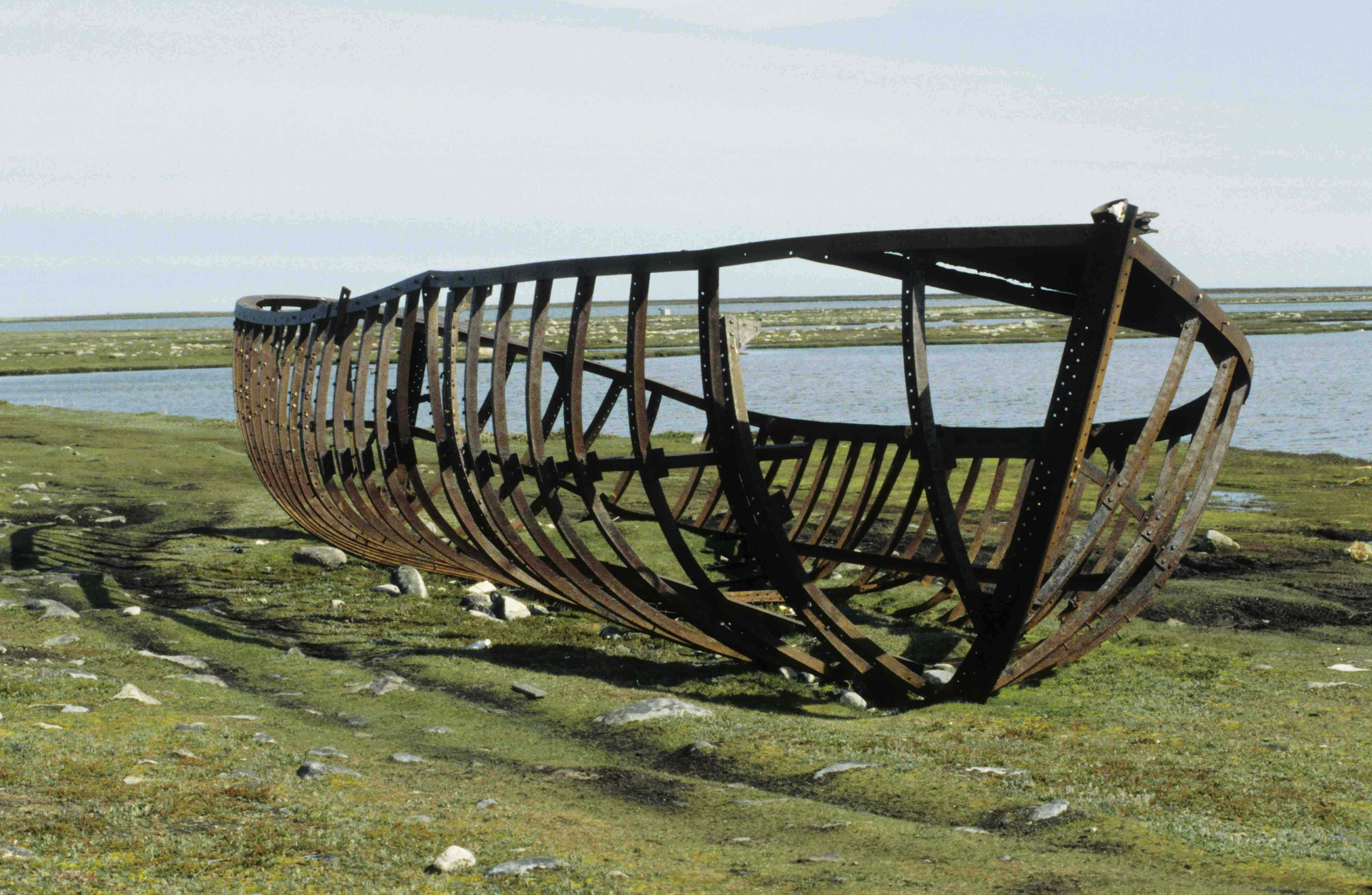
The skeleton of a boat consists of a number of ribs that sprout from the keel

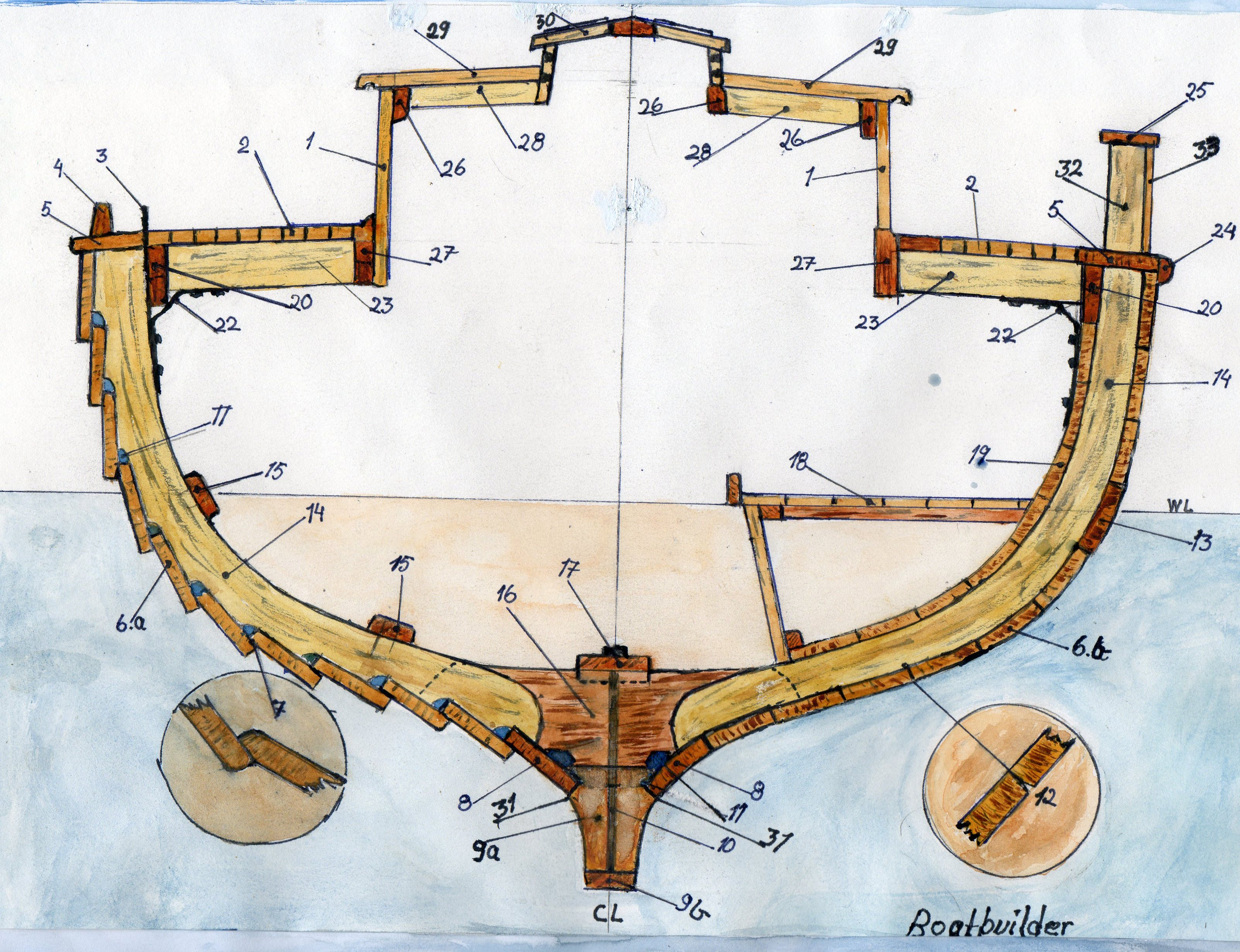
Rib marked with 14

On a vessel's hull, a rib is a lateral structural member which runs between gunwales and sprouts from the keel. They are called "ribs" because they resemble the human rib. The ship's outer planking and inner sheathing are attached to the ribs. For ships that are too large for a rib to be made out of a single piece of wood, the ribs are made of multiple sections called futtocks that are scarfed together. The ancient writers Polybius and Plato held that, since the ribs of a ship were the most important part of the ship's framework, then if the ribs were new, then the ship as a whole was new. Iron was first used in shipbuilding to make the ribs and frames, with wood sheathing attached to them, but this proved inadequate compared to replacing the wood sheathing with iron plates.

== See also ==
- Frame (nautical)
