= Carpenterstown (townland, Castleknock) =

Neighbourhood of Castleknock, Ireland

Carpenterstown (Irish: Baile an Chairpintéaraigh) is a townland in the civil parish of Castleknock. The civil parish is part in the ancient barony of Castleknock. In geology, the townland rests on a substratum of limestone and comprises 166 statute acres, the whole of which is arable land.

== Location and access ==
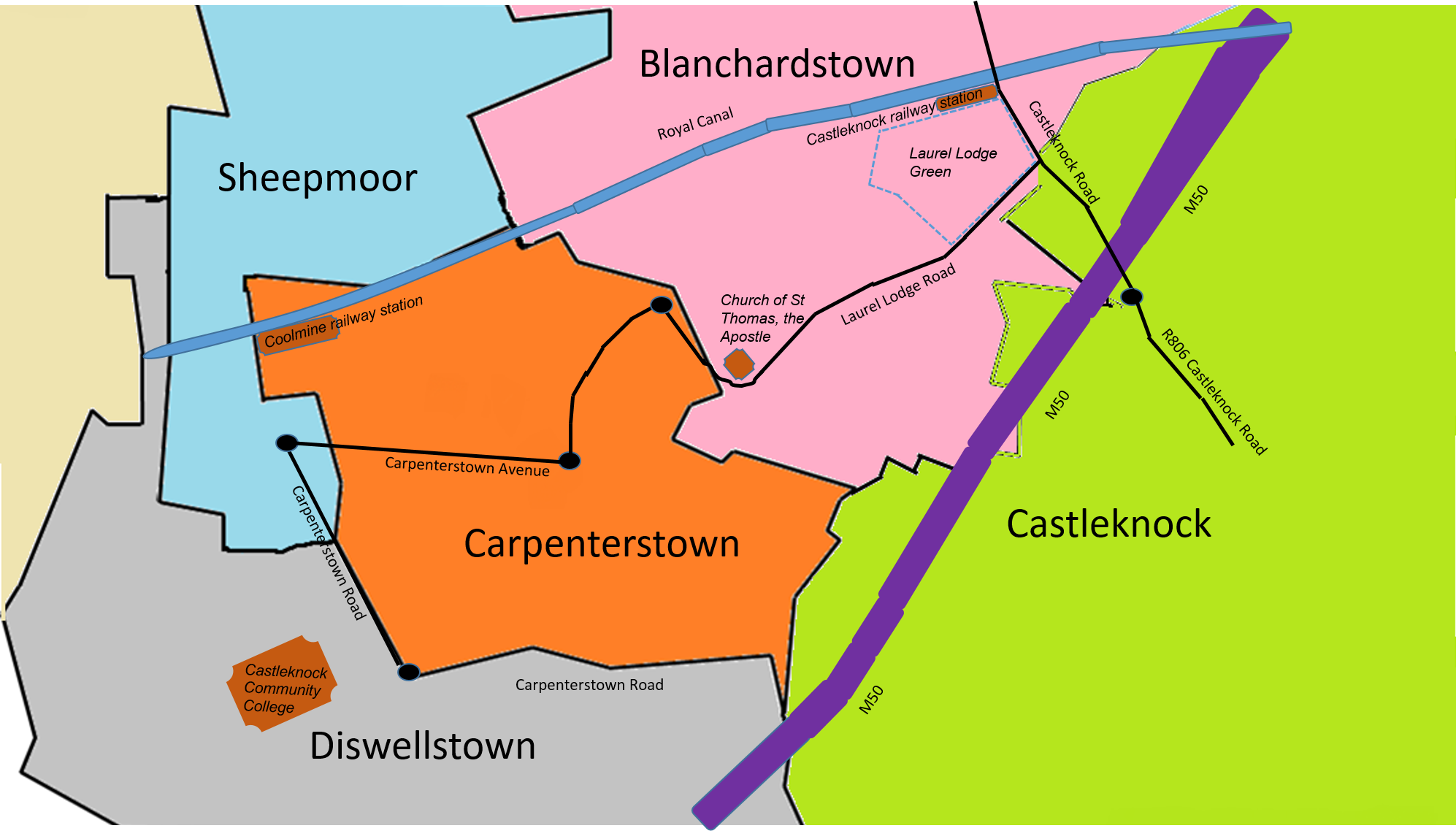
Carpenterstown townland map

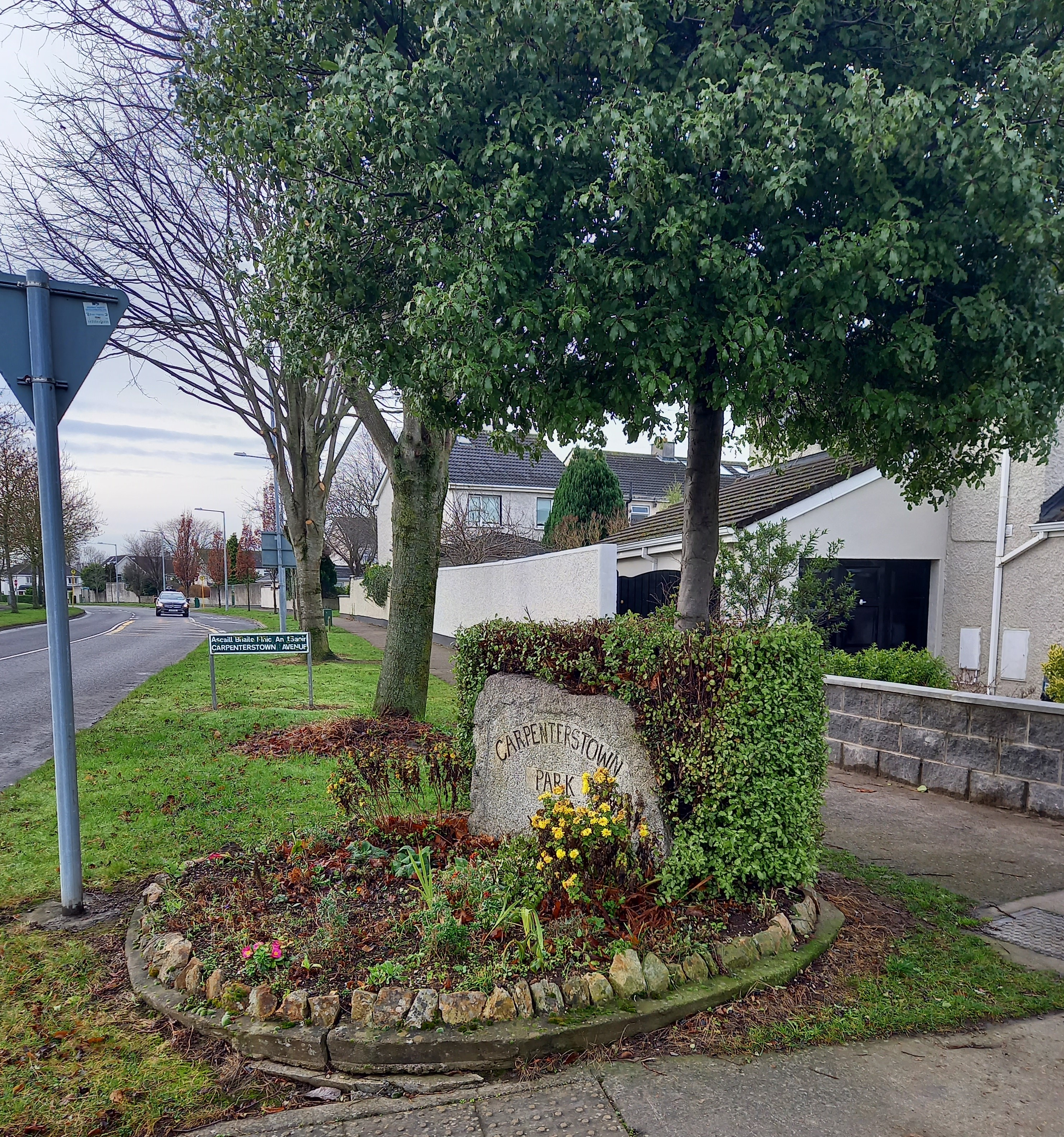
Carpenterstown stone placename

Carpenterstown is roughly bounded to the north by the Royal Canal, to the northeast by the townland of Blanchardstown, to the southeast by the townland of Castleknock, and to the south and west by the townland of Diswellstown. The land occupied by the "Carpenter" pub and by Castleknock Community College is actually in the latter townland, not in Carpenterstown proper. While the M50 motorway is close by, it does not cross any part of Carpenterstown.

At Coolmine railway station, trains on the Maynooth/Longford line connect the city centre, at Dublin Connolly, Tara Street and Dublin Pearse stations, to Maynooth, Longford and Sligo. Dublin Bus route 37 passes along the Carpenterstown Road from the Blanchardstown Shopping Centre to the city centre.

== History ==
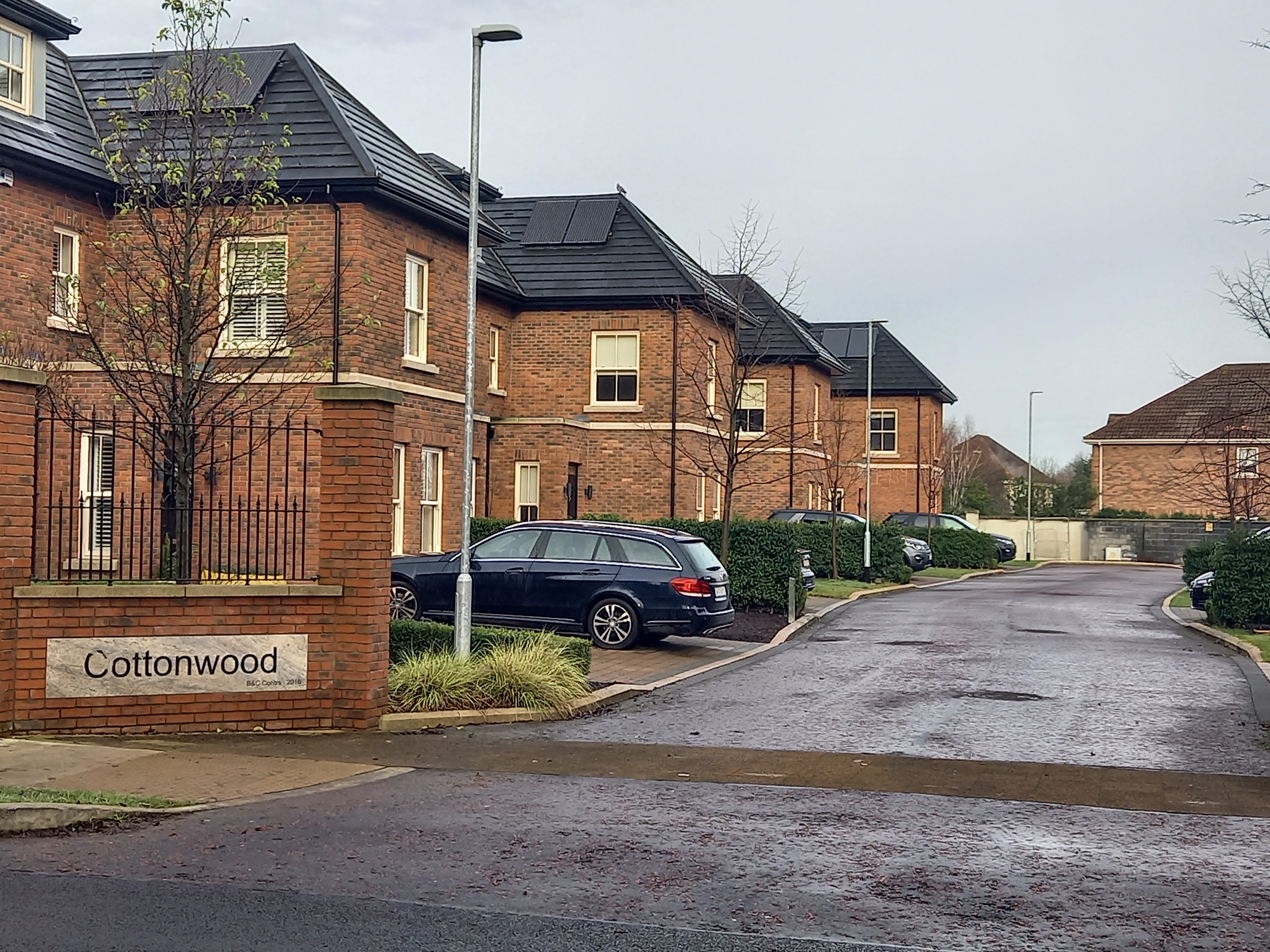
Cottonwood

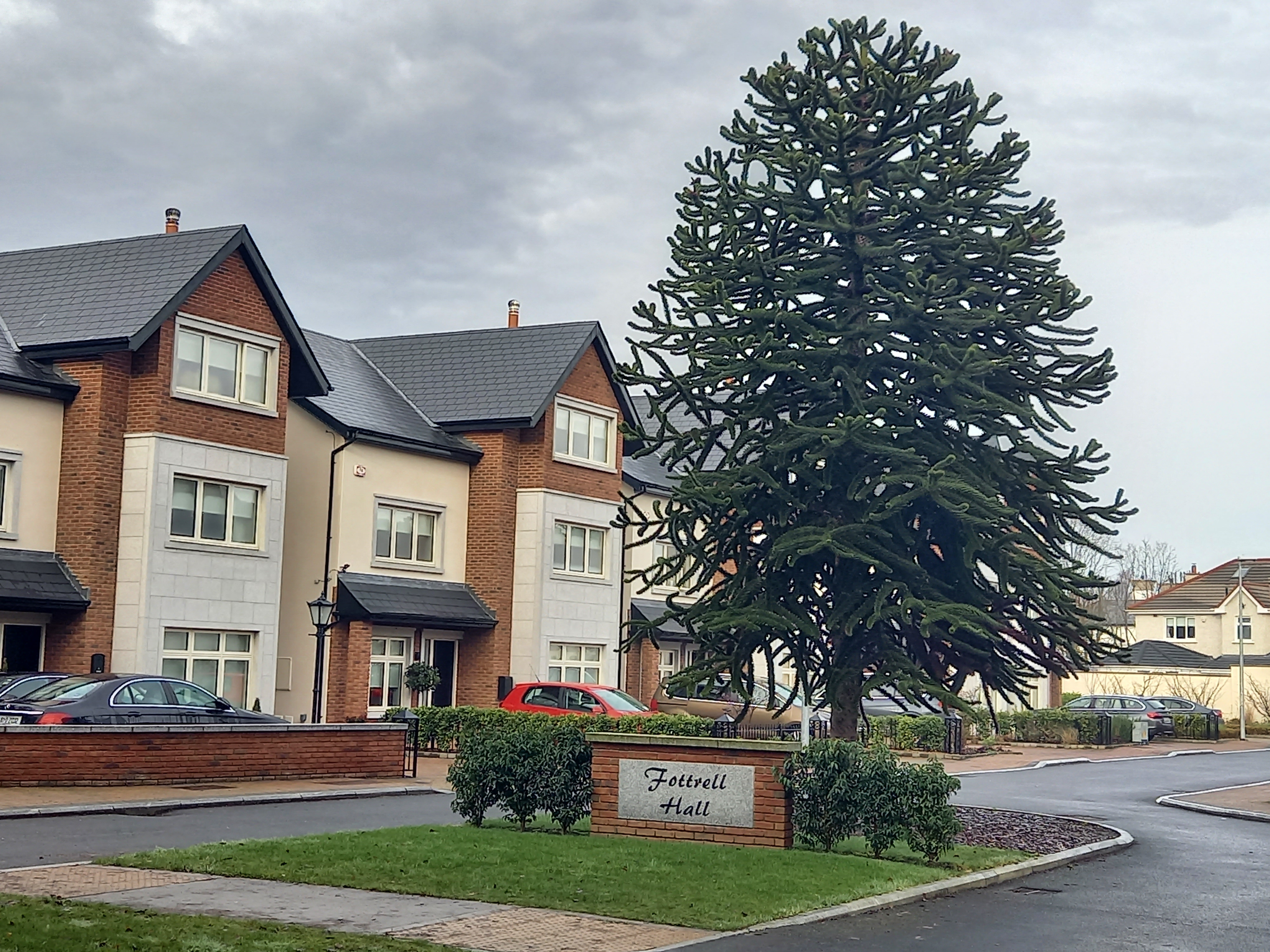
Fottrell Hall

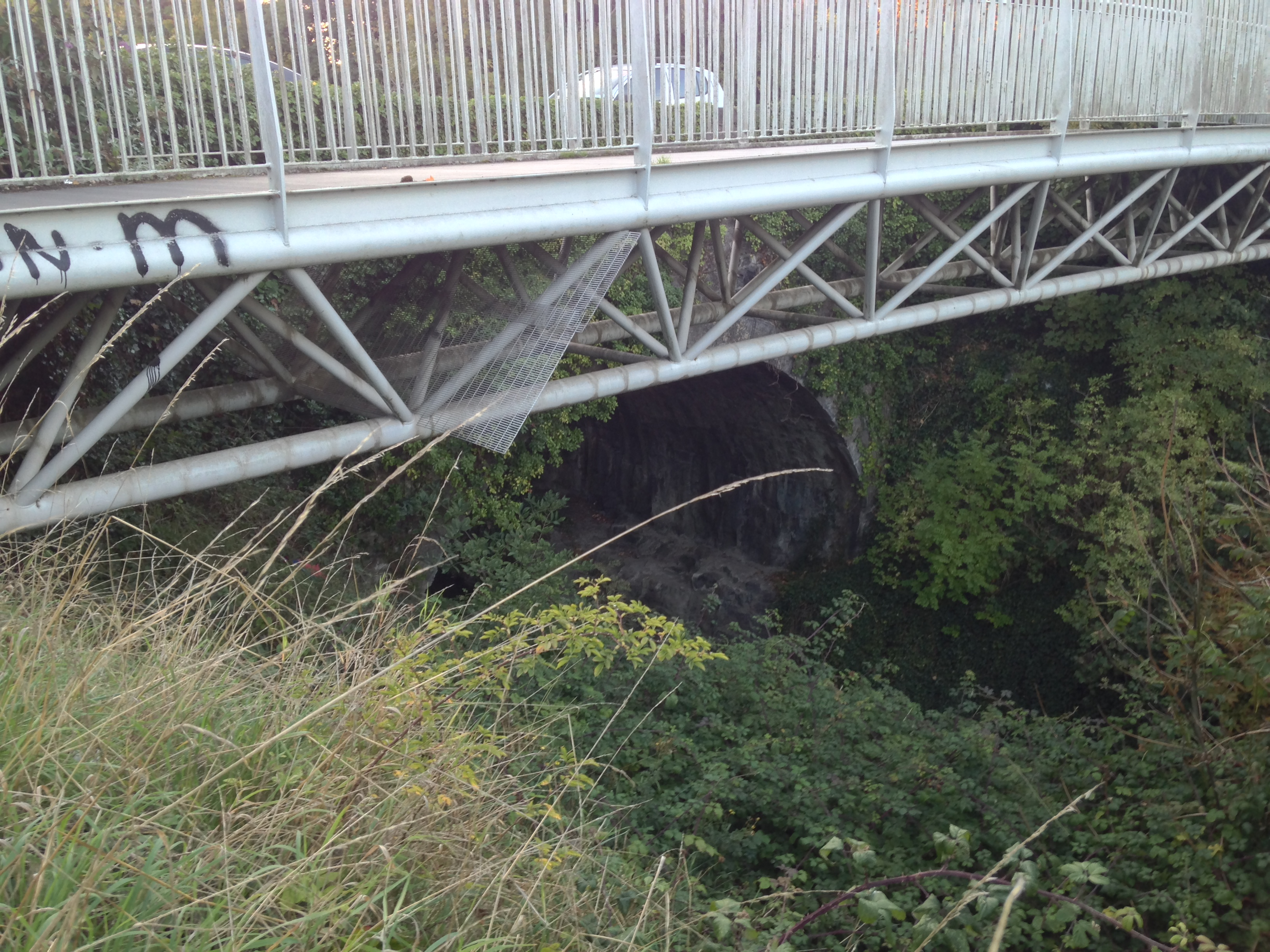
Kirkpatrick Bridge

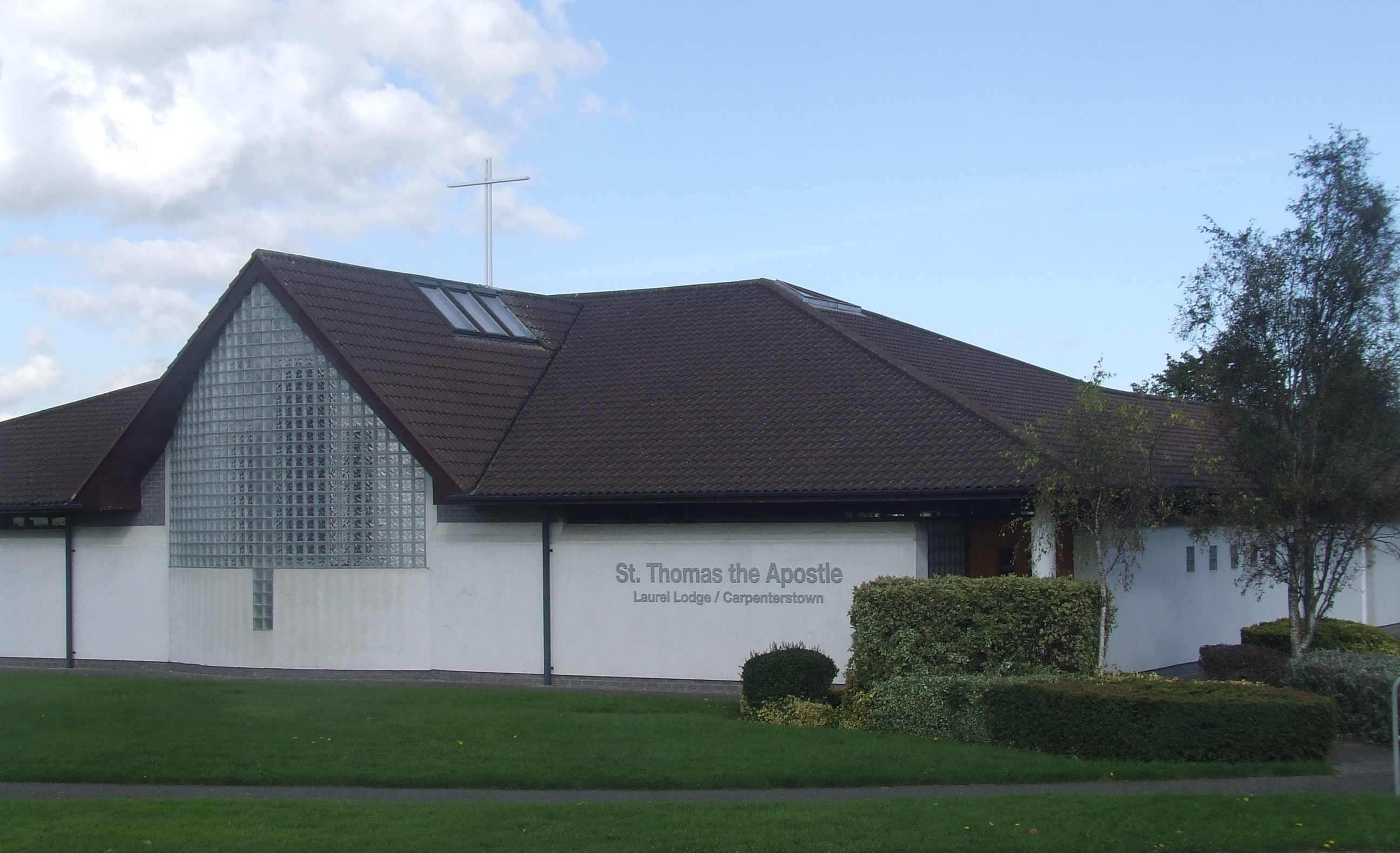
Church of St Tomas, the Apostle

Griffith's Valuation of 1848 lists nineteen occupiers and five landowners. The five landowners were:

- Hugh O'Neill; land valued at £13, 2s, house valued at £14 and 10s
- James Ledwich; land valued at £114 and 13s
- Unoccupied; land valued at £101 and 9s
- Rev. F. Alexandaer Saunders; land valued at £25 and 14s, house valued at £22 and 6s
- Midland Great Western and Royal Canal Co.; the value of the railway land was £33 and 11s; the canal and banks were valued at £11 and 16s.

Many large houses occupied both sides of the Carpenterstown road where it forms the southern boundary of the townland. These have mainly been demolished and small clusters of houses have been built on the lands. These included Cottonwood, Fottrell Hall and the farm at Outfarm Lane.

== Features ==
The Royal Canal crosses the top end of the townland from west to east between the 13th and 12th locks. The level crossing at Coolmine railway station - Kirkpatrick Bridge - crosses the canal.

In the Catholic Church, the parish of St Thomas, the Apostle encompasses the entire townland. Anomalously, the church building itself is just outside the townland proper as it is to the east of the treeline that separates Carpenterstown from Blanchardstown.
