= St Thomas the Apostle parish, Laurel Lodge =

St Thomas, the Apostle parish
- Parish of St Thomas, the Apostle, Laurel Lodge / Carpenterstown
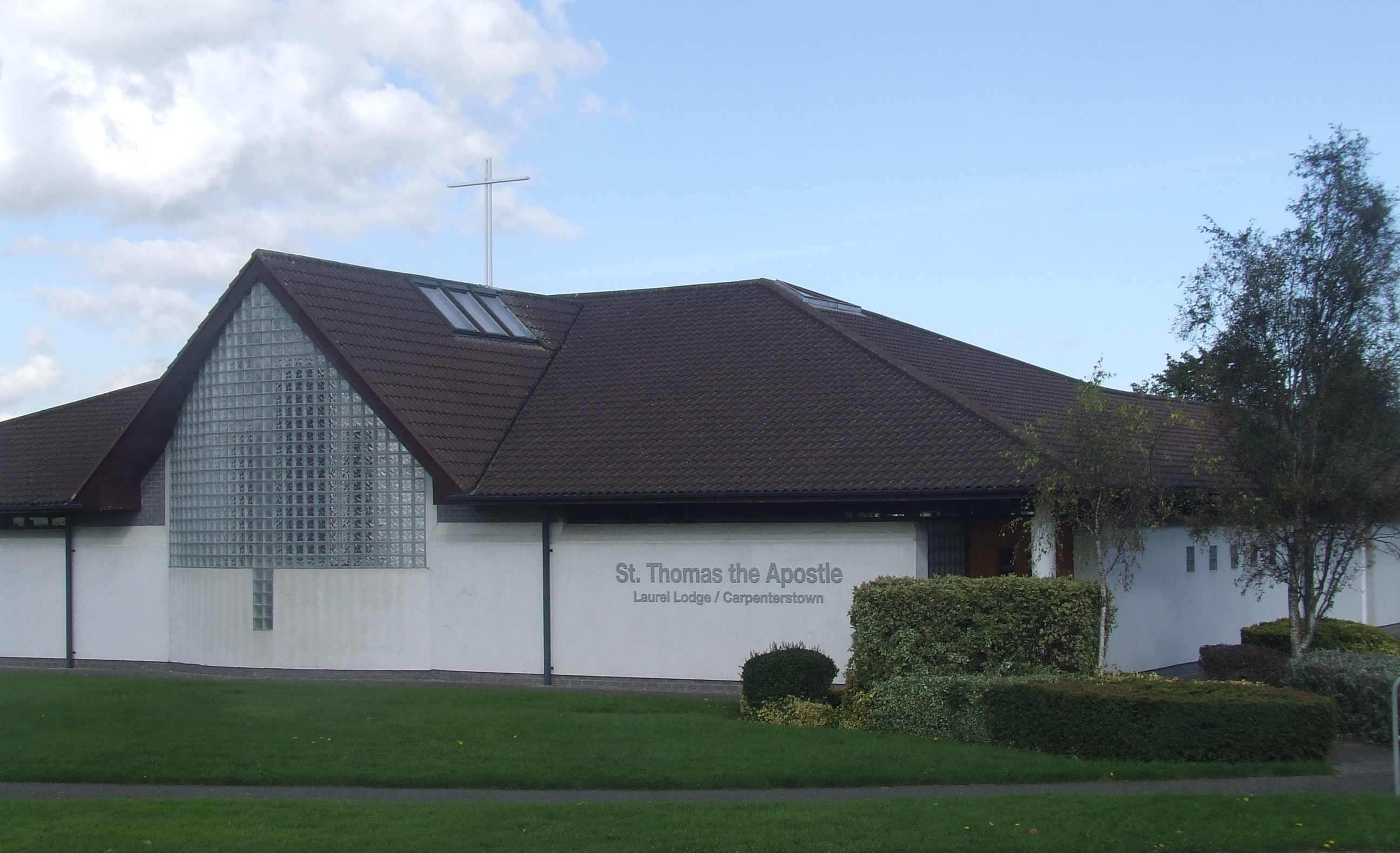
- Church of St Thomas, the Apostle
- St Thomas, the Apostle parish
- 53°22′37.5″N 6°22′40.4″W
- Location: Laurel Lodge / Carpenterstown, Castleknock, Fingal
- Country: Ireland
- Denomination: Roman Catholic
- Website: Laurel Lodge parish

History
- Founded: 1989
- Dedication: Thomas the Apostle
- Consecrated: 6 June 1993

Architecture
- Architect(s): Joseph Kennedy of Edward N. Smith & Kennedy

Administration
- Province: Dublin
- Diocese: Archdiocese of Dublin
- Deanery: Blanchardstown deanery

Clergy
- Bishop: Most Rev. Dermot Farrell
- Pastor: Rev. Brendan Quinlan

St Thomas, the Apostle parish is an ecclesiastical parish in the Blanchardstown deanery of the Roman Catholic Archdiocese of Dublin. It is served by the church of "St Thomas, the Apostle". The parish is centered on "Laurel Lodge" district and the townland of Carpenterstown in the civil parish of Castleknock, Fingal in Ireland. On 6 June 2018, the Archbishop of Dublin, Diarmuid Martin, concelebrated mass in the parish church on the occasion of the 25th anniversary of the laying of the building's foundation stone.

== Location and access ==
In the Blanchardstown deanery, the parish is bounded to the east by the parish of "Our Lady, Mother of the Church", in Castleknock village; St Thomas' was constituted out of this parish in 1989. To the south and west lies the parish of "St Mochta", Porterstown. To the north is the parish of "St Bridget" in Blanchardstown.

Roughly speaking, the Royal Canal forms the northern boundary; M50 orbital motorway forms the eastern boundary; the Carpenterstown Road forms the southern boundary while the approaches to the Riverwood estate forms the western edge. It comprises the housing estates of Laurel Lodge, Carpenterstown Park, Bramley, Oaktree, Laverna and Ashleigh.

There are two Irish Rail train stations in the parish: Castleknock and Coolmine. Trains on the Maynooth/Longford line connect the city centre, at Dublin Connolly, Tara Street and Dublin Pearse stations, to Maynooth, Longford and Sligo. The Dublin–Navan railway line connects Docklands railway station to Hansfield and Dunboyne.

The parish is served by two Dublin Bus routes: 37 and 38.

== Ecclesiastical history ==
In the 19th century, the Roman Catholic parish of Blanchardstown encompassed much of the area now within the Dublin 15 postal district. Following the relaxation of the Penal Laws, it became possible for Catholic adherents to consider the construction of additional churches and to repair the existing stock of religious buildings. Church authorities used the opportunity to implement the Tridentine reforms which saw the parish as the basic unit of ecclesiastical organisation and the parish priest as the central figure within the parish.

The new parish priest of Blanchardstown in 1839, Fr Michael Dungan, oversaw the construction of a number of new churches, which are today independent parishes in their own right, and invited a number of religious communities to provide for the education of Catholic children. St Brigid's Church, Blanchardstown – not to be confused with a church of the Church of Ireland in nearby Castleknock – was constructed in 1837 upon the foundation of a church that had been built prior to 1731. It is the Mother church of 12 other churches, among them this parish, that were constituted out of St. Brigid's over the following 156 years.

== Parish church ==
The Church is a 600-seater community designed church with a welcoming courtyard. It was designed by Joseph Kennedy of Edward N. Smith & Kennedy and built by Matthew Wallace, Builders, Wellingtonbridge, County Wexford. The design was consciously low key with an emphasis on integration into the community. The foundation stone was laid on 21 February 1993 by Desmond, Cardinal Connell, Archbishop of Dublin. The church was opened on 6 June 1993. As well as the church proper, it features a Day Chapel/Community Room with a Parish Office and Sacristy.

Behind the altar is an eight-foot high triple stained glass window from the Harry Clarke studio. It depicts the Immaculate Conception and was donated to the parish by the Dominican Sisters in Dún Laoghaire when sadly their convent there closed down. It was restored and built into the new church and care was taken to preserve it for the future.

Another notable feature is the white marble carving that depicts Our Lady giving the Rosary to Ss Catherine and Dominic. This was also donated by the Dominican Sisters. It was carved in the late 19th century by Padraig and Willie Pearse's father in his stoneworks at "Great Brunswick Street" (or Pearse Street as it is currently known).

== Amenities ==
The "Gallagher Group", owned by Patrick Gallagher built the core estates now known as "Laurel Lodge" in the 1980s. A parcel of land was set aside by Gallagher Group for community use and presented to the Church. A number of buildings for the use of the community was subsequently built on this parcel: the present church building, courtyard and car park, a parochial house, a primary school, a community centre (1995), a credit union, a Montessori crèche (2007), and a community garden (2013).

The nearest secondary school is Castleknock Community College (CCC). While pupils from Scoil Thomáis form the largest block in CCC, the school is just outside the parish proper in the townland of Diswellstown. Other secondary schools in the locality include Castleknock College (a private fee paying school for boys); Mount Sackville (a private fee paying school for girls) and Luttrellstown Community School.

Castleknock GAA club is centred on the parish although its main grounds are located at Somerton Lane, Diswellstown. The club's most notable member, Ciarán Kilkenny, plays for the Dublin GAA senior football team.

== Pastors ==
- Rev. Eugene Kennedy (1983 - 2005)
- Rev. Michael Cullen (2005 - 2014)
- Rev. Brendan Quinlan (2014 - 2021)
- Rev. Damian McNeice (2021 - )

== Gallery ==
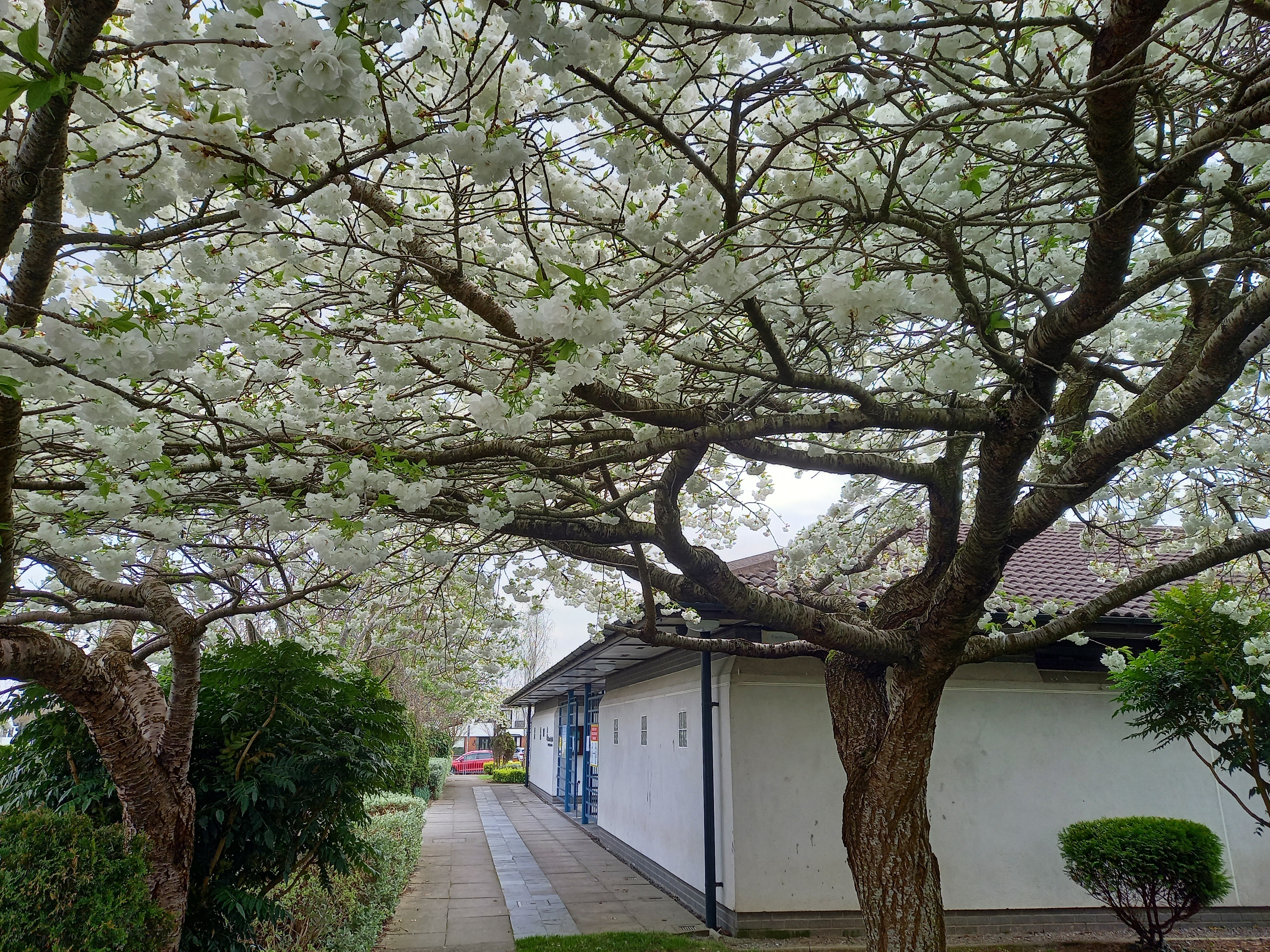
Canopy of cherry blossom, Easter 2021

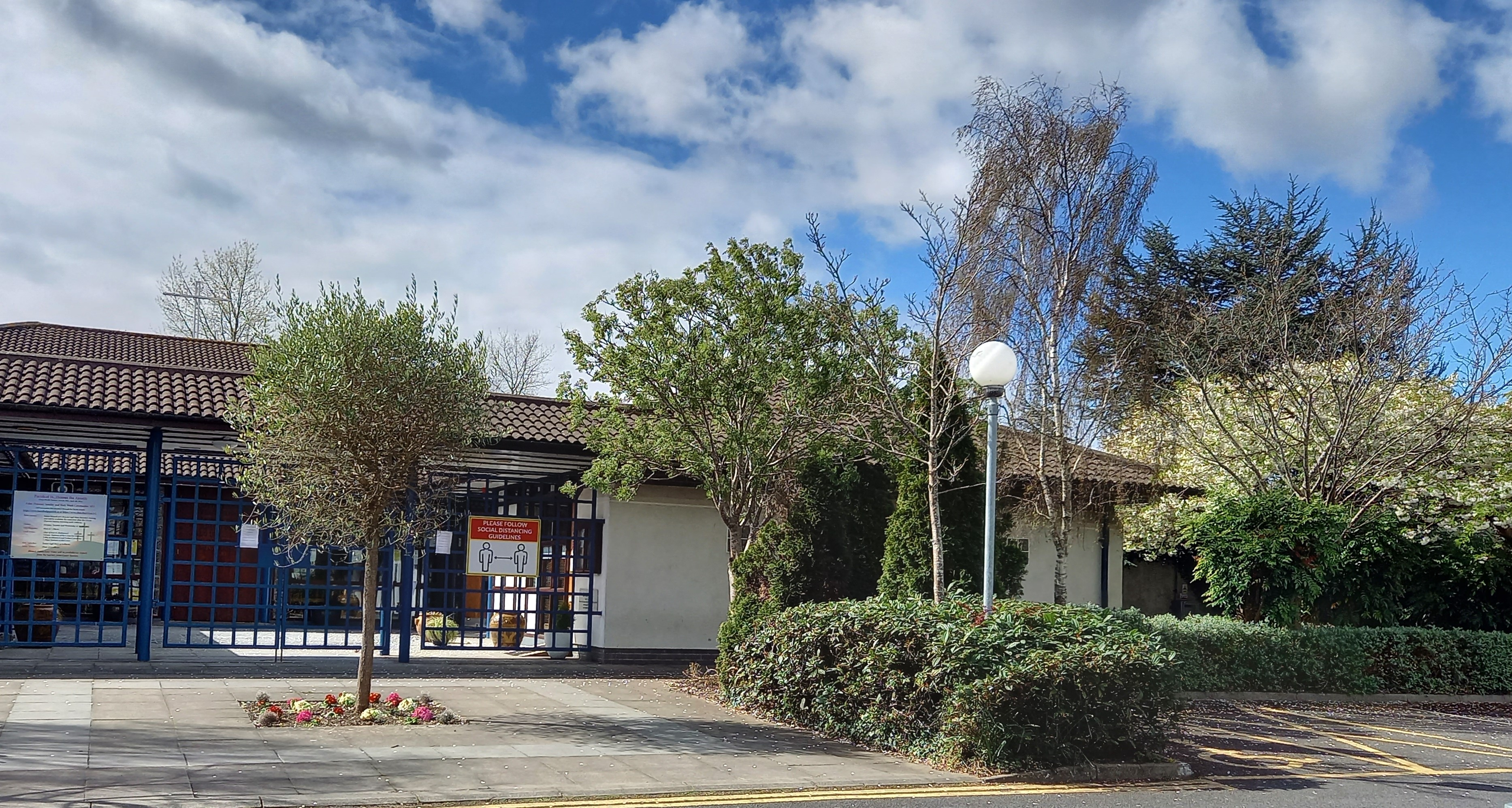
Entrance to courtyard with cherry blossoms

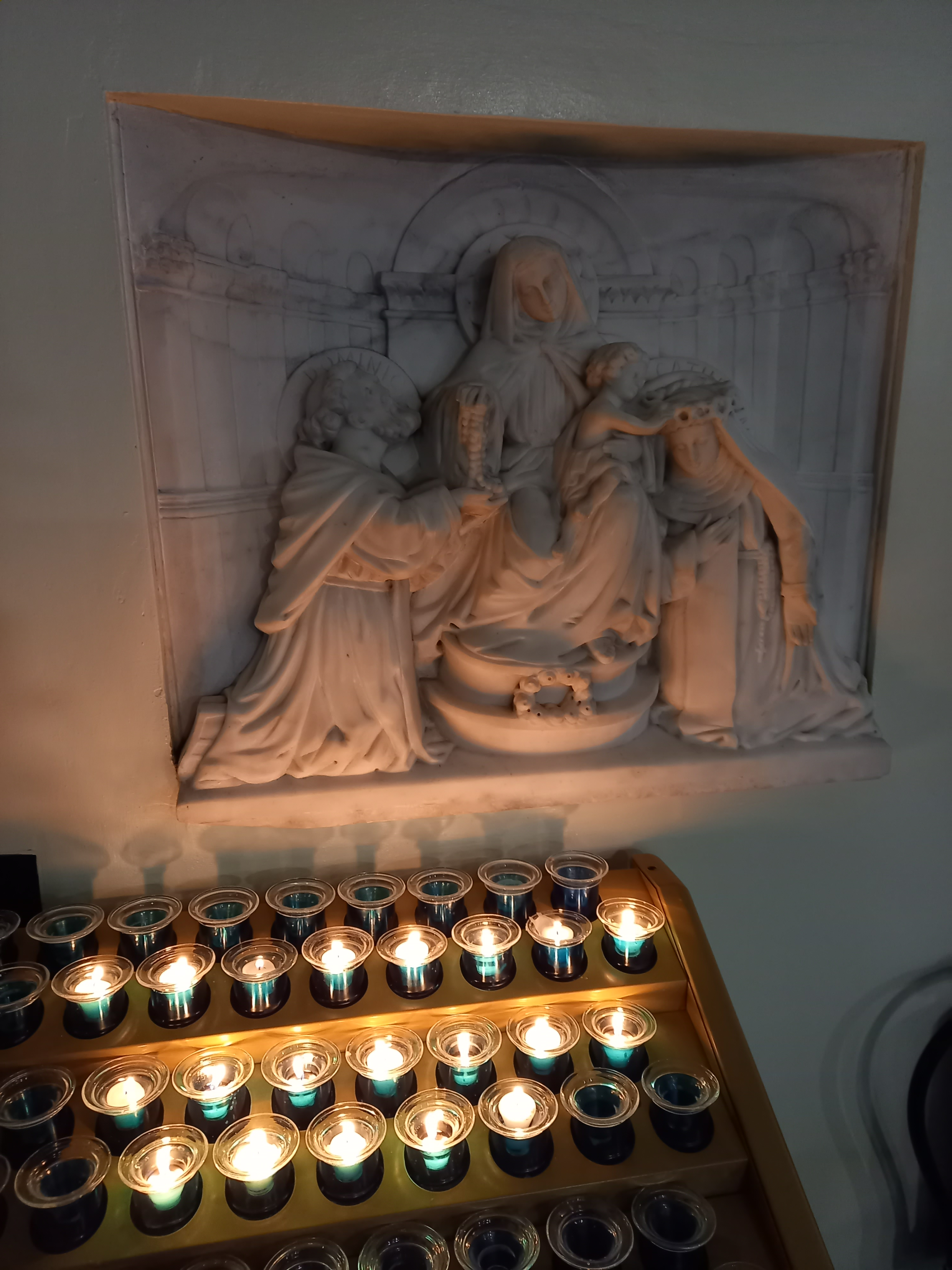
Marble relief of SS Dominic and Catherine

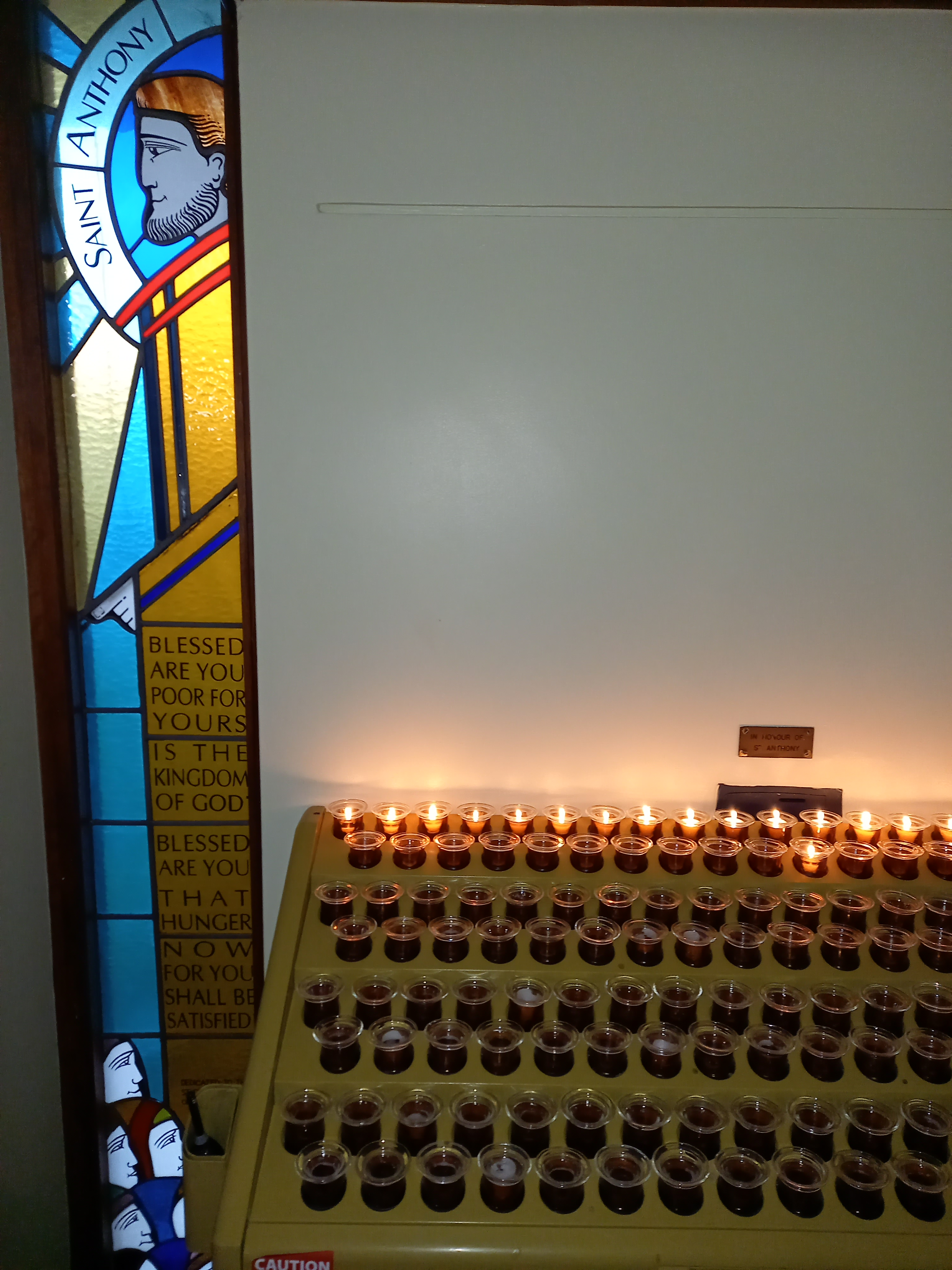
Shrine to St Anthony

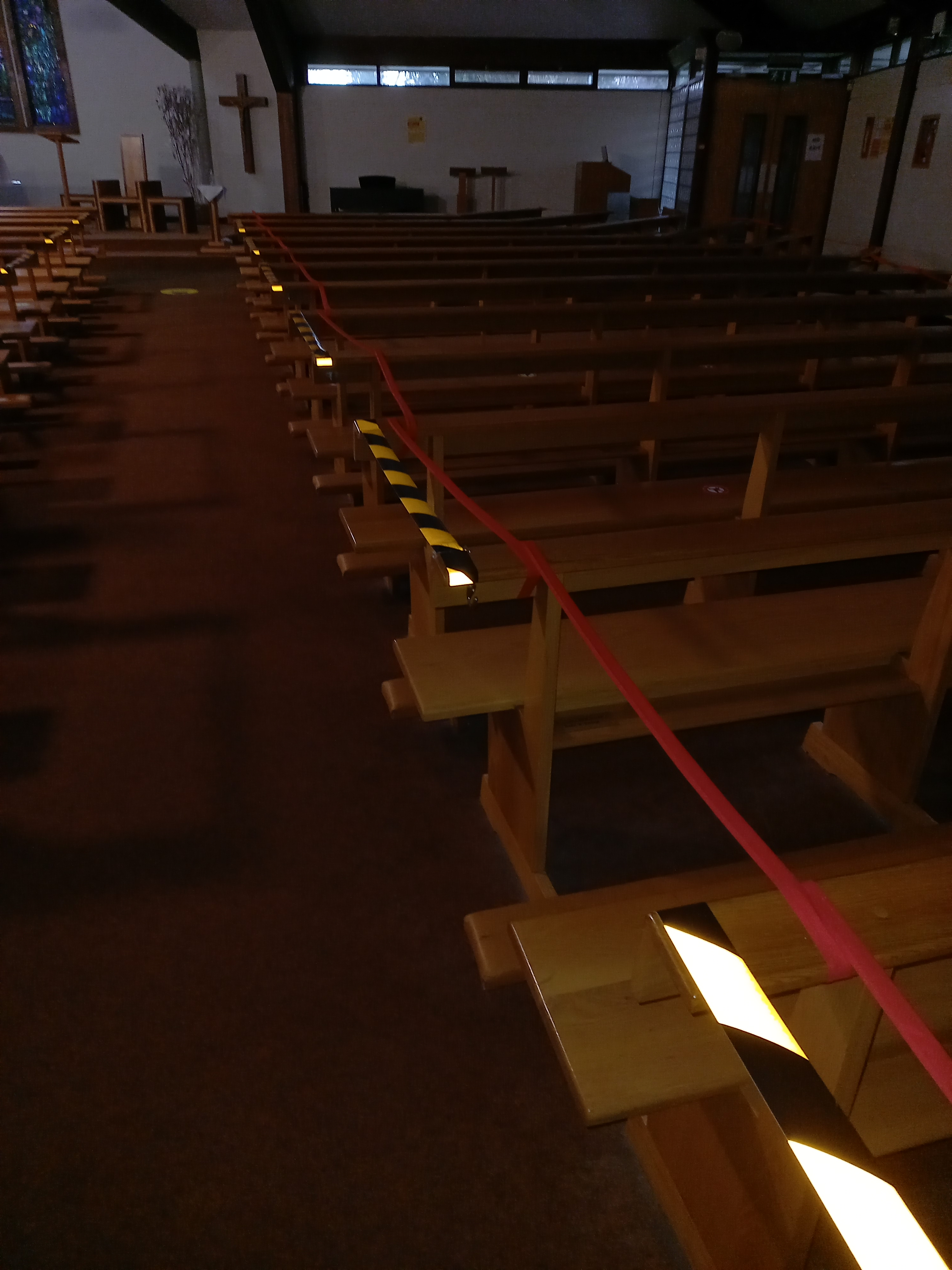
Pews cordoned off due to level 5 lockdown

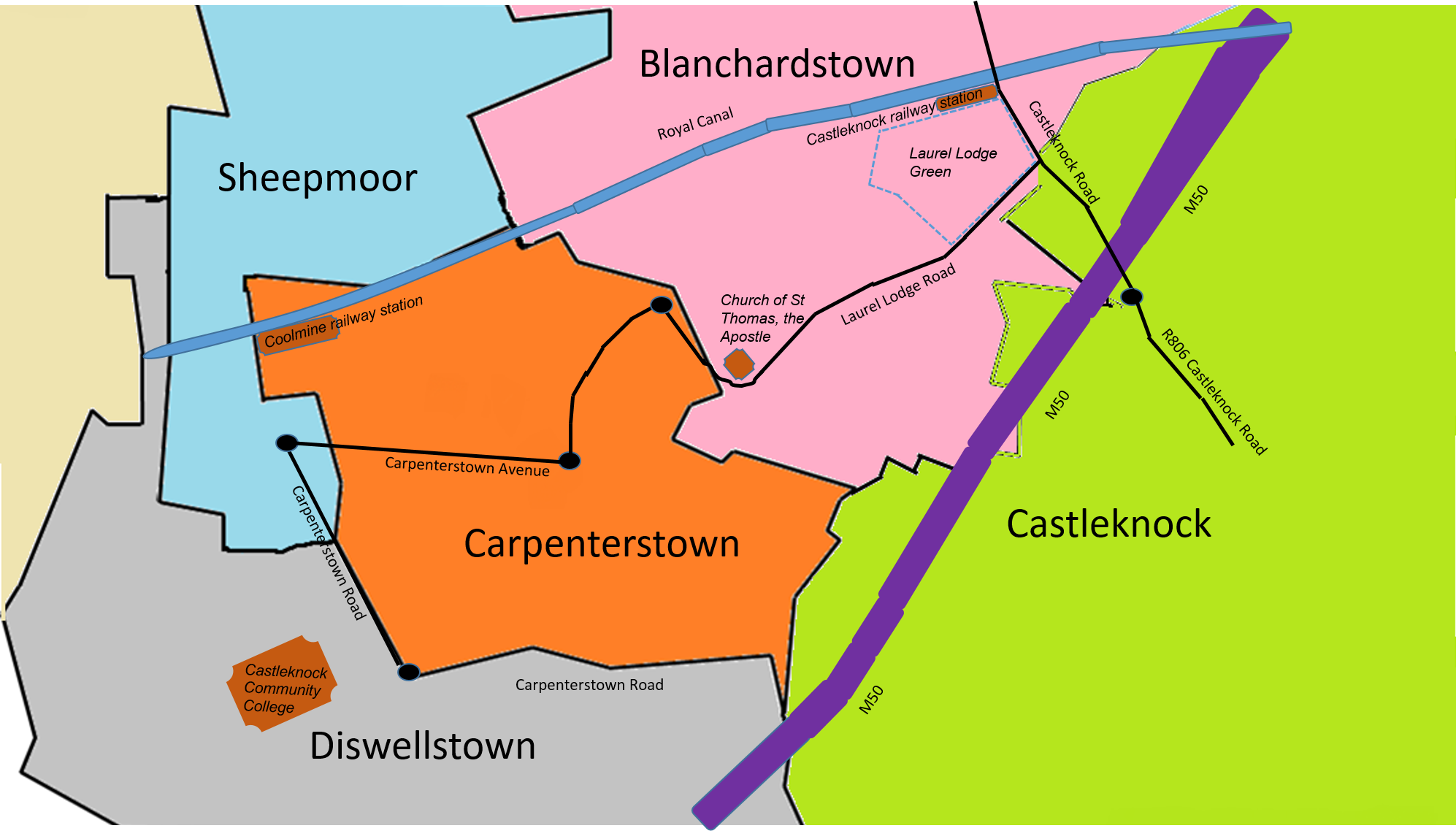
Location of the parish within the townlands (coloured) showing principle roads and amenities

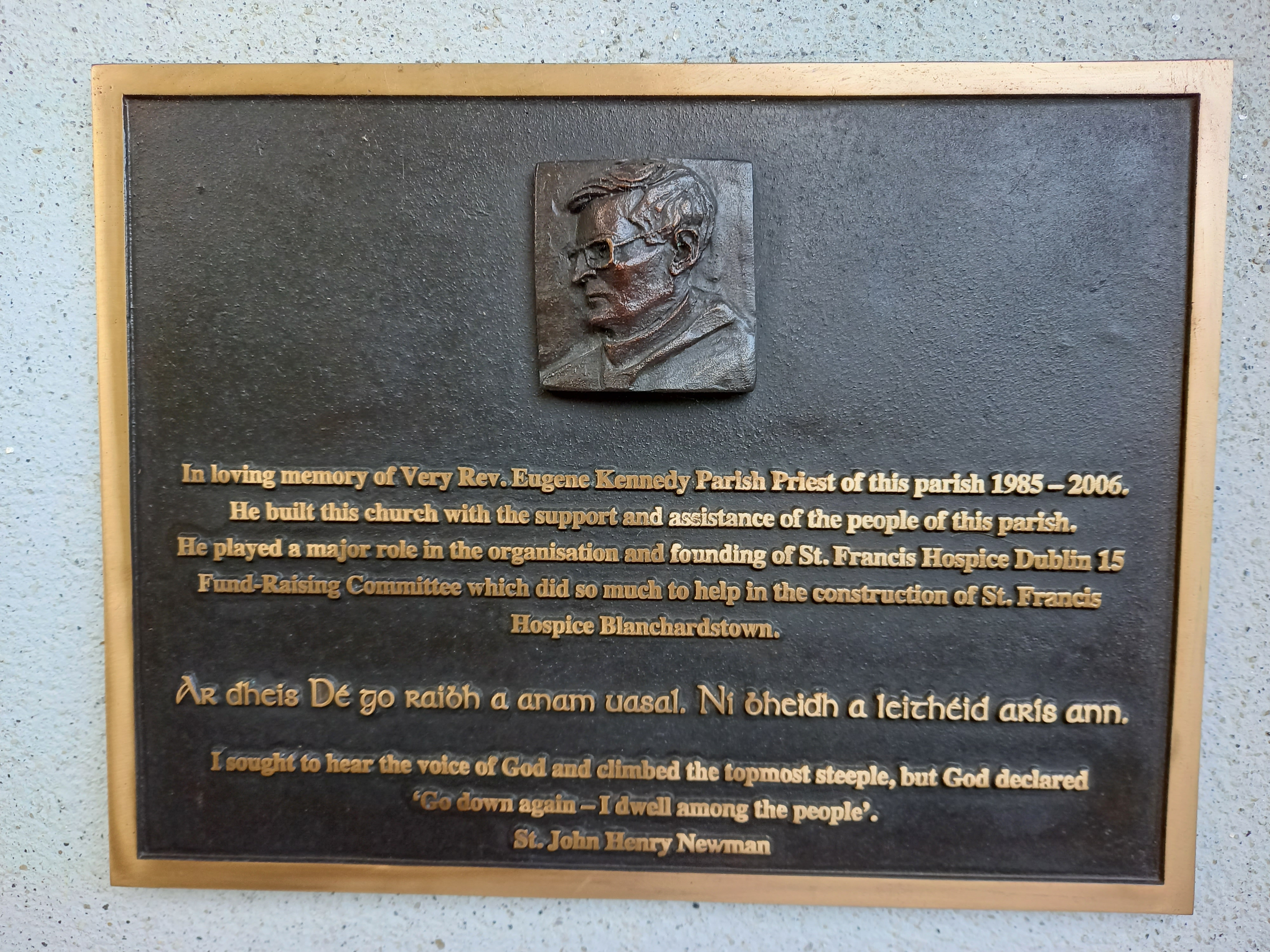
Plaque to Fr. Eugene Kennedy on the wall of St. Thomas the Apostle church

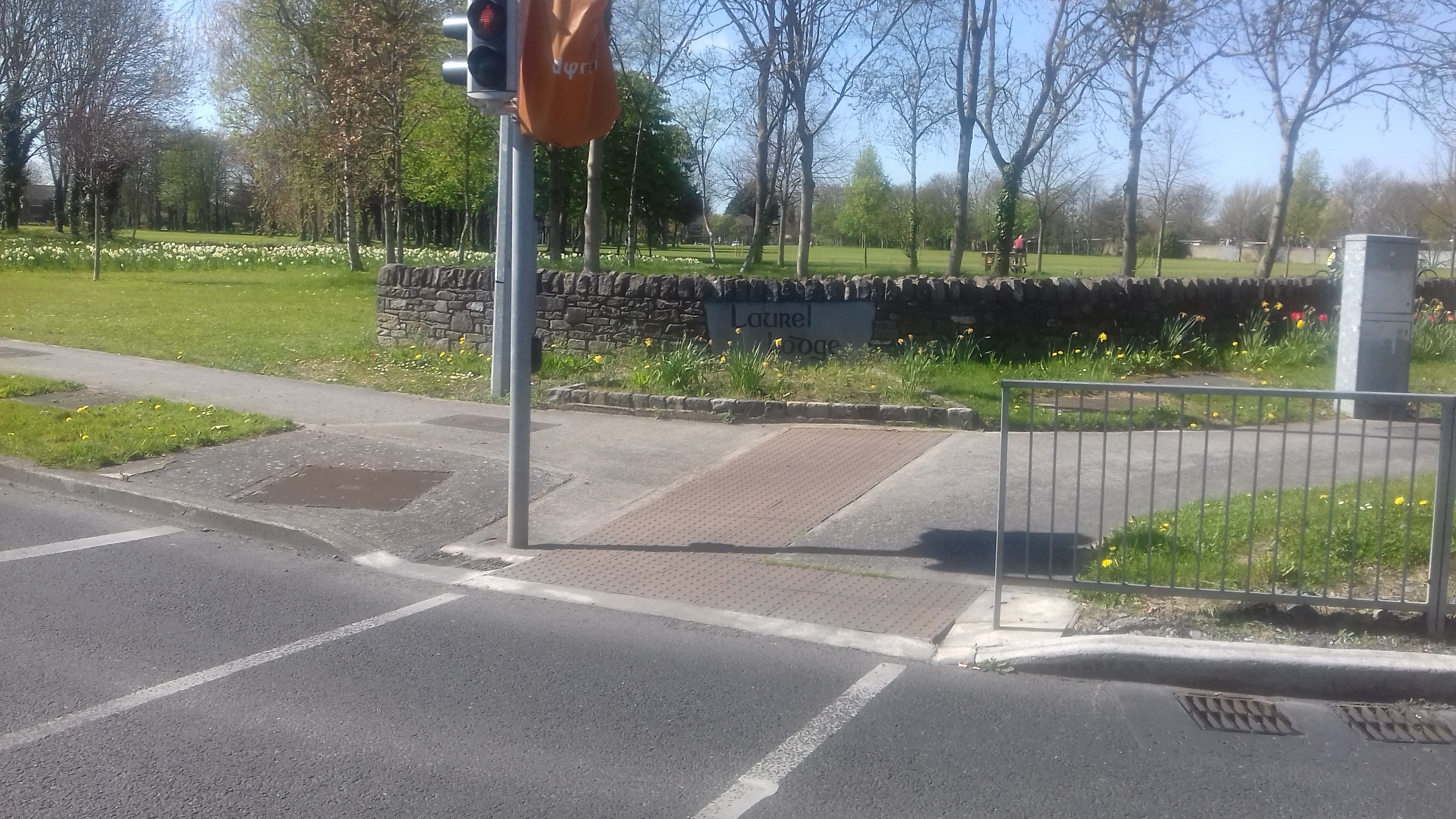
Entrance stone to the Laurel Lodge district in the parish of St Thomas, the Apostle

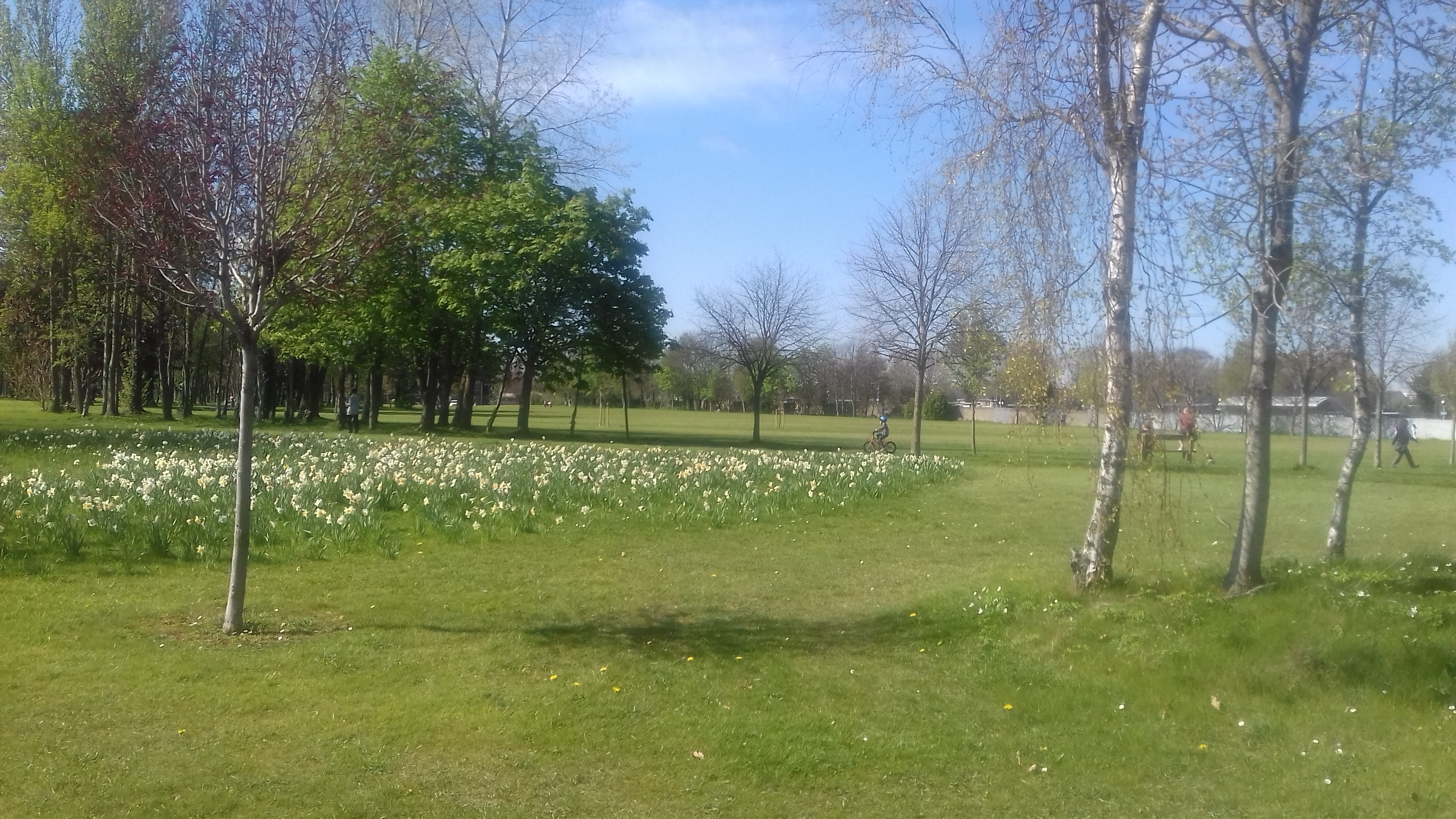
View of Laurel Lodge green

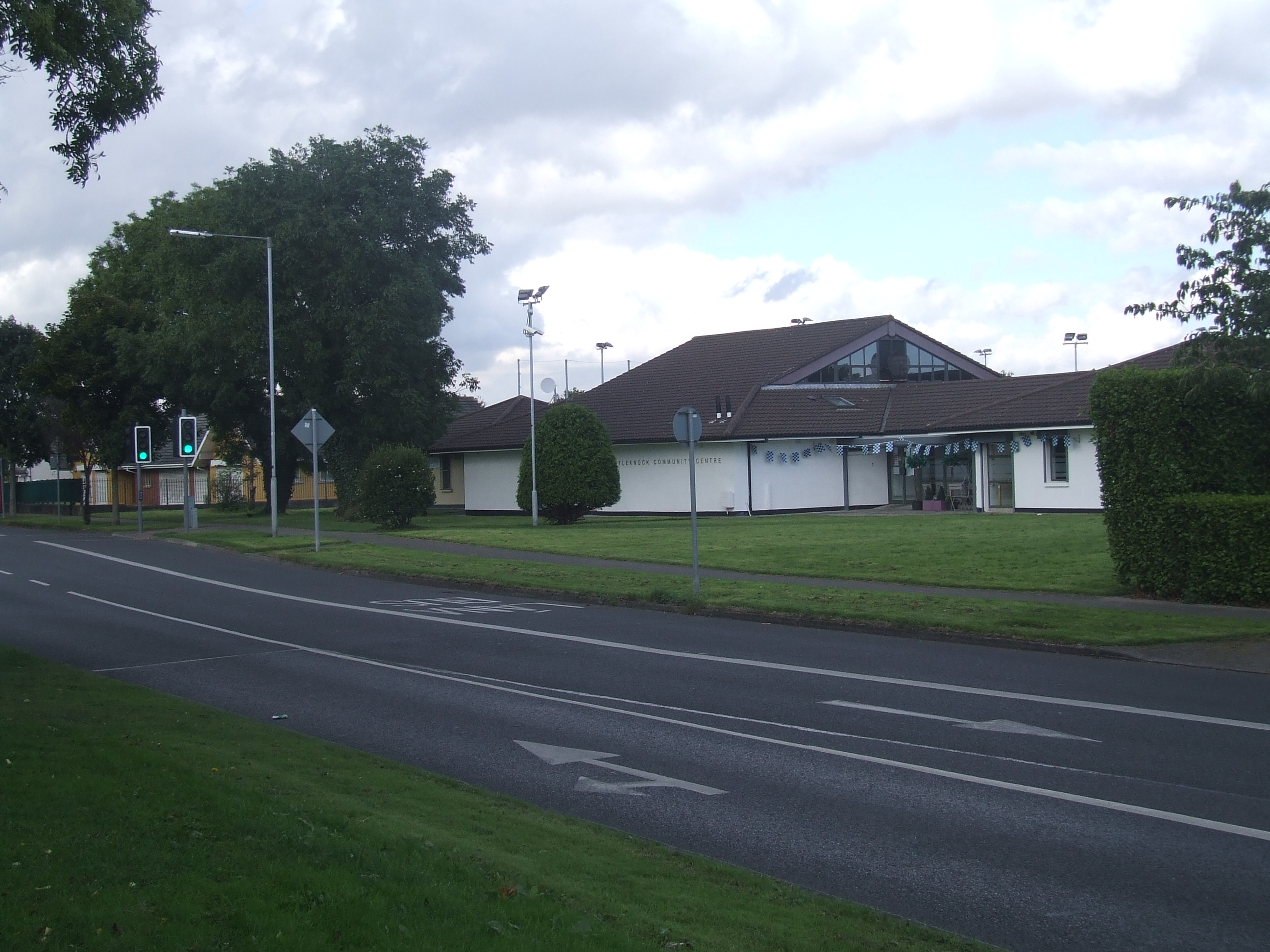
Cluster of community buildings

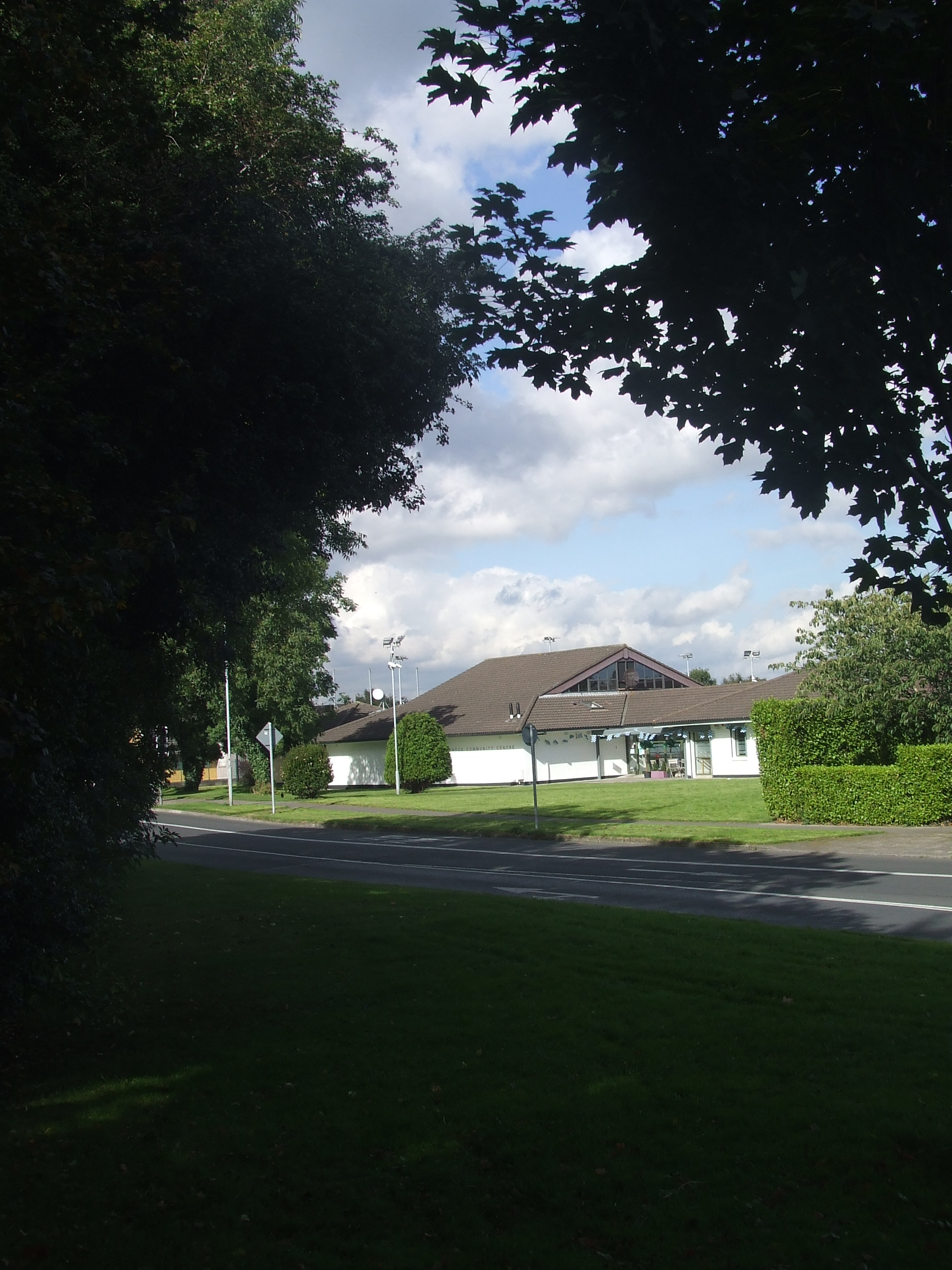
Community Centre.
Tree line divides two townlands.

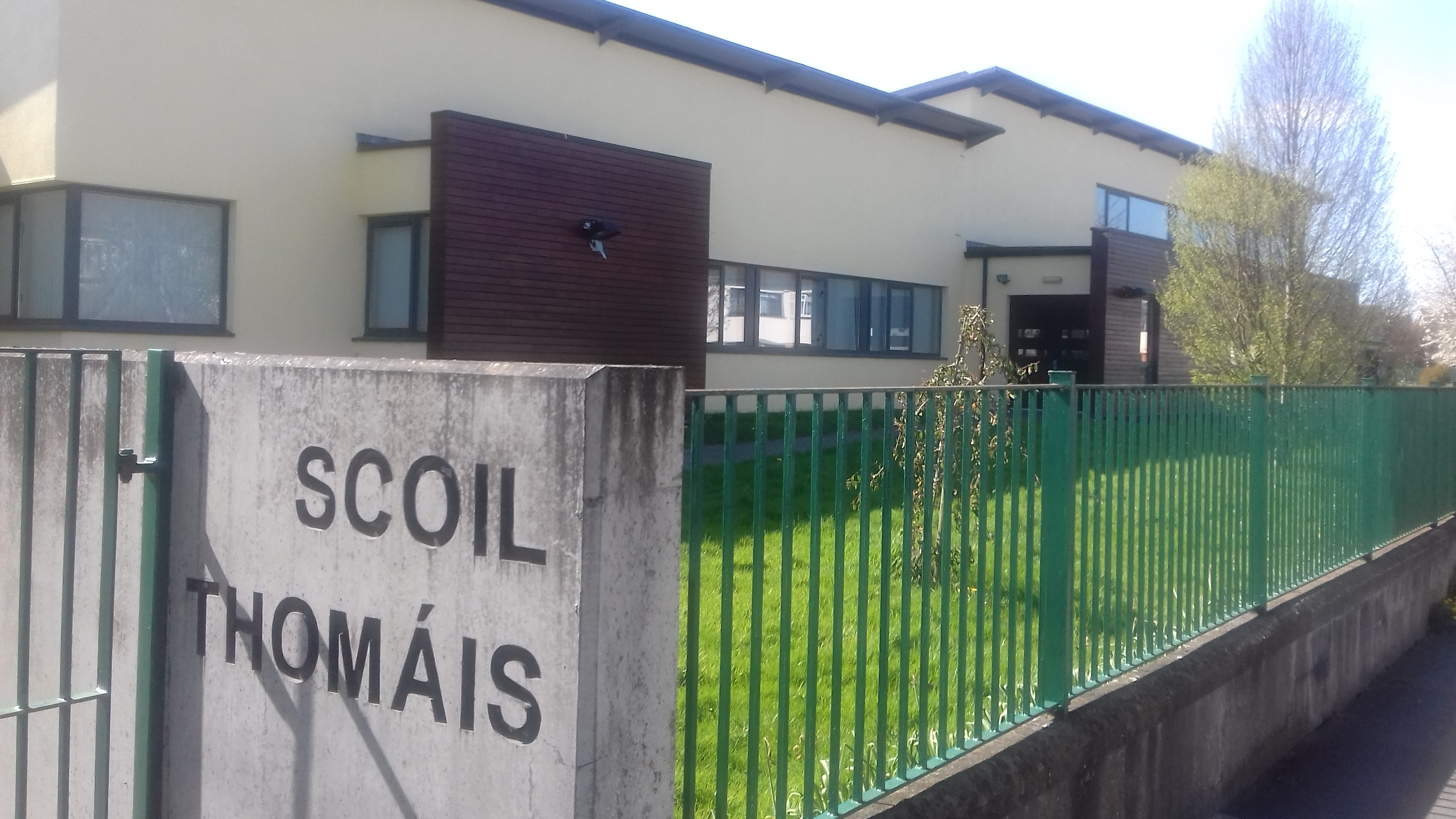
Scoil Thomáis national school
