= Castleknock =

Western suburb of Dublin, Ireland

Castleknock Caisleán Cnucha (Irish)
- Suburb (village core)
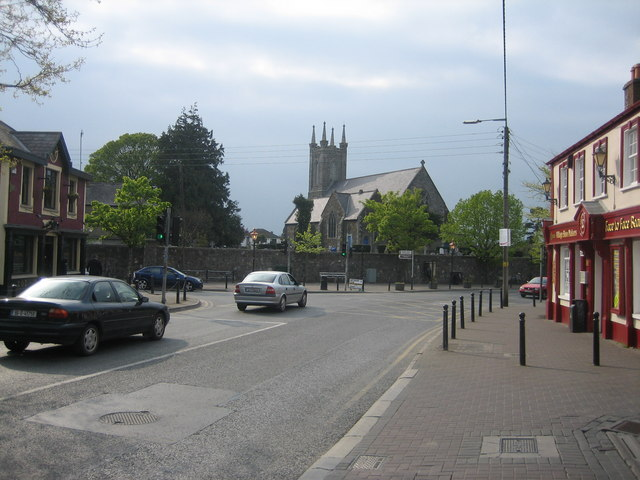
- Castleknock Village at the junction of Castleknock Road and College Road

- Location in Ireland
- Coordinates: 53.374°N 6.359°W
- Country: Ireland
- Province: Leinster
- County: County Dublin
- Local government area: Fingal County Council
- Dáil Éireann: Dublin West
- EU Parliament: Dublin
- Elevation: 63 m (207 ft)

Population (2022)
  - Urban: 27,049
- Eircode routing key: D15
- Dialing code: 01, +353 1
- Irish Grid Reference: O078378

Castleknock (Irish: Caisleán Cnucha) is a suburb of Dublin, Ireland, located 8 km (5 mi) west of Dublin city centre. It is in the modern county of Fingal. (Note: The name is sometimes mistranslated as "Castle on the hill". Originally the village was named simply "Cnucha" after a woman of that name, likely a member of the Firbolg, was buried in a mound near the ruin of Castleknock Castle on the grounds of Castleknock College.)

The name "Castleknock" also refers to older units of land division: a townland, a civil parish and a barony.

== Etymology ==
In a poem which F. Elrington Ball describes as relating to "the earliest centuries after Christ", the origin of the name Cnucha is reputedly connected with Conn of the Hundred Battles, a legendary High King of Ireland whose foster mother bore this name: —

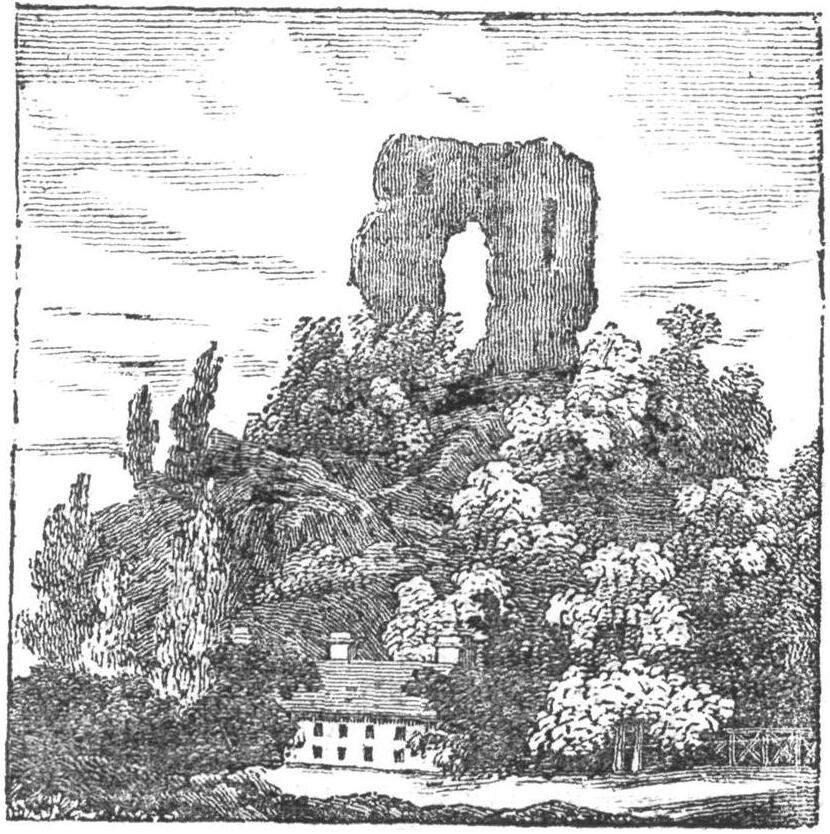
Castleknock Castle, 1835, Dublin Penny Journal

The nurse of Conn who loved this strip of land
Was Cnucha of the comely head;
She dwelt on the dun with him
In the reign of Conn of the Hundred Fights.
Cnucha, the daughter of Concadh Cas,
From the land of Luimncach broad and green,
Died yonder in that house
To the horror of the Gaels.
The woman was buried, a grief it was.
In the very middle of the hill;
So that from that on Cnucha
Is its name until the judgment.

The 12th-century castle of Castleknock (Caisleán Cnucha) derives its name from the castle of Cnoc (meaning hill) or Cnucha (foster-mother of Conn of the Hundred Battles). Documents from the 12th and 13th centuries refer to the place as Castrum Cnoc, simply Cnoc, Chastel-cnoc or Castel-Cnoc. The name Castleknock therefore derives from the Norman-era castle which was named either for the topography of the hill (cnoc) located at the centre of the modern neighbourhood and/or the personal name of the foster mother of a semi-legendary high king (Cnucha).

== History ==
=== Gaelic period ===
There is some documentary evidence in chapter 72 of the Life of St. Patrick by Jocelin of Furness to support the belief that when St. Patrick had finished his visit to the City of Dubh Linn he came to Castleknock to try to convert Murinus, the local ruler of the place. Despite his efforts Patrick was unsuccessful and departed while imparting a curse on the King.

According to the Four Masters in the year 726 the death occurred of Congalach of Cnucha.

In 916 the Annals tells us that Niall Glindubh of the Northern Uí Neill became High King of Ireland and is referred to as "Niall of Cnucha" which signifies both the ascent of Cnucha (Castleknock) in prominence as well as the descent of Tara as a royal seat. In September 919, Niall gathered the Irish Chiefs and their armies at Castleknock from where they led a fight against the Danes who had regained their power over Dublin. The Battle of Islandbridge, also known as the Battle of Áth Cliath, proved to be Niall's last battle. He was slain along with five other Irish Chiefs and their armies were subdued.

=== Feudal period ===
In 1171, the High King of Ireland, Ruaidrí Ua Conchobair, gathered his forces at Cnucha to counter the Norman invasion of Ireland. Ua Conchobair was comfortable at Cnuch having overcome his Danish vassals in the Kingdom of Dublin some years previously. The siege exerted pressure on the forces of the Cambro-Norman leader, Strongbow, who asked the Archbishop of Dublin, Lawrence O'Toole to negotiate with the High King at Cnucha. Strongbow's offer to recognise Ua Concubhair as High King was rejected. He was commanded to depart from Ireland immediately. Strongbow was furious but Maurice de Prendergast, who had accompanied Archbishop O'Toole, had observed that the Irish troops were largely inactive and unready for battle. His report to Strongbow spurred him to lead a successful attack against the High King's armies. Ua Concubhair fell back from Cnucha and the other Irish Chiefs returned to their territories. The battle was lost and the Norman conquest of Ireland was successful. Following the siege, the Normans realised the strategic importance of the location which looked over the city of Dublin. Consequently, in 1177, a feudal barony of Castleknock was created out of the Lordship of Meath by Hugh de Lacy, Lord of Meath who granted it to Hugh Tyrrel. It was held for three and a half knight's fees, owed to the superior Lord of Fingal.

The title and lands of Castleknock were held by the Tyrell family until 1370 when Hugh Tyrell and his wife died of the plague. It passed by inheritance to the Burnell family. The first Baron, Hugh Tyrrel, gave lands in the Manor of Kilmainham to the Knights of St. John whose legacy continues in the area today in the form of St. John Ambulance. Later, civil parishes, based on the boundaries of the ecclesiastical parishes of the Established church were used to sub-divide the barony.

In 1185, the second baron, Richard de Tyrell, gave a grant of land to the Benedictine Monks of the Abbey of Little Malvern, Worcestershire, to endow a religious house at Castleknock in honour of Saint Brigid. Later they built a chapel, the White Chapel at Coolmine, which served the parish of Clonsilla. In 1219 the great tithes of the parish were appropriated by Archbishop Henry de Loundres to the Priory of Malvern on condition that they should add five monks to their number. In 1225 the monks granted half of the tithes of the manor of Castleknock to the use of St Patrick's Cathedral, renouncing to the Archbishop all rights to the vicarage and its small tithes and oblations. In 1226 the first Prebendary of Castleknock, Richard De Gnouessale, was appointed. However, by 1468 the church and lands at Castleknock were transferred to the ownership of the Abbey of St Mary in Dublin city.

=== Modern period ===
Following the English Reformation and the dissolution of the monasteries under Henry VIII of England, the Priory at Castleknock was destroyed and in 1609 a church was built on the site for the use of the Church of Ireland. The foundation stone of the church, which is in use today, still on the site of the Abbey, was laid in 1803. The spire was added in 1864 by friends of the late James Hans Hamilton as a memorial to the 1st Baron Holmpatrick of Abbottown and MPfor the County of Dublin.

Castleknock eventually came to be divided among a number of important families and their country estates. These included the Guinnesses at Farmleigh, and Knockmaroon, the Laidlaws at Abbey Lodge, the Godleys at Oatlands, and the Brookes at Sommerton House. The Earl of Iveagh's principal seat was at Farmleigh until 1999 when it was purchased by the Government of Ireland. It was restored and converted into a State Guest House and opened to the public in 2001. Although they left Farmleigh in 1999, the Guinness family are still present in Castleknock at Knockmaroon House and its Demesne, located on Carpenterstown Road and the seat of Lord Moyne. The Brooke Baronets lived at Sommerton House until they sold it in 1911 to the Laidlaw family who were resident at Sommerton and Abbey Lodge until the 1980s.

== Location and access ==
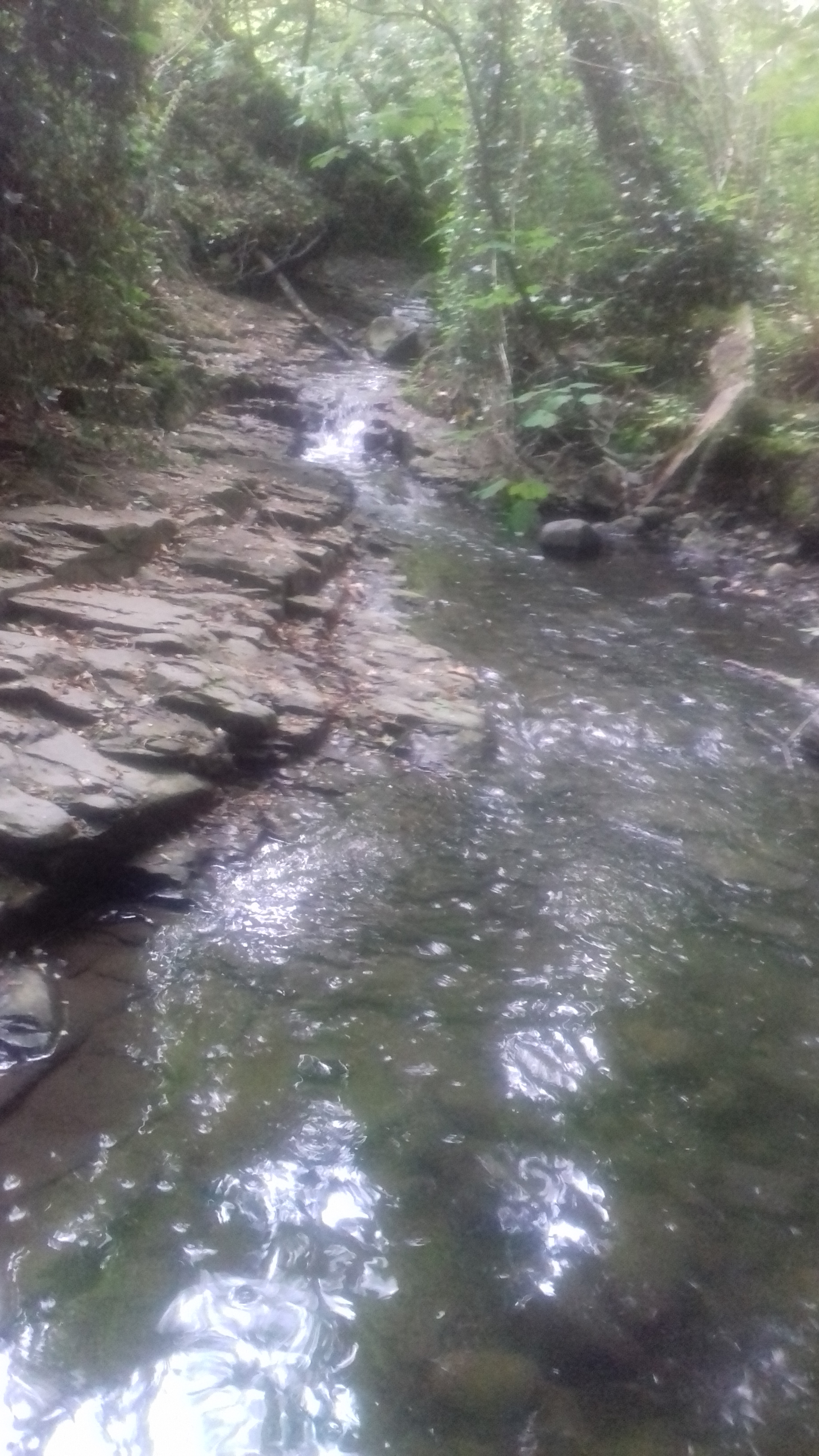
The Diswellstown Stream in the glen near Sandpit cottages and Knockmaroon Demesne

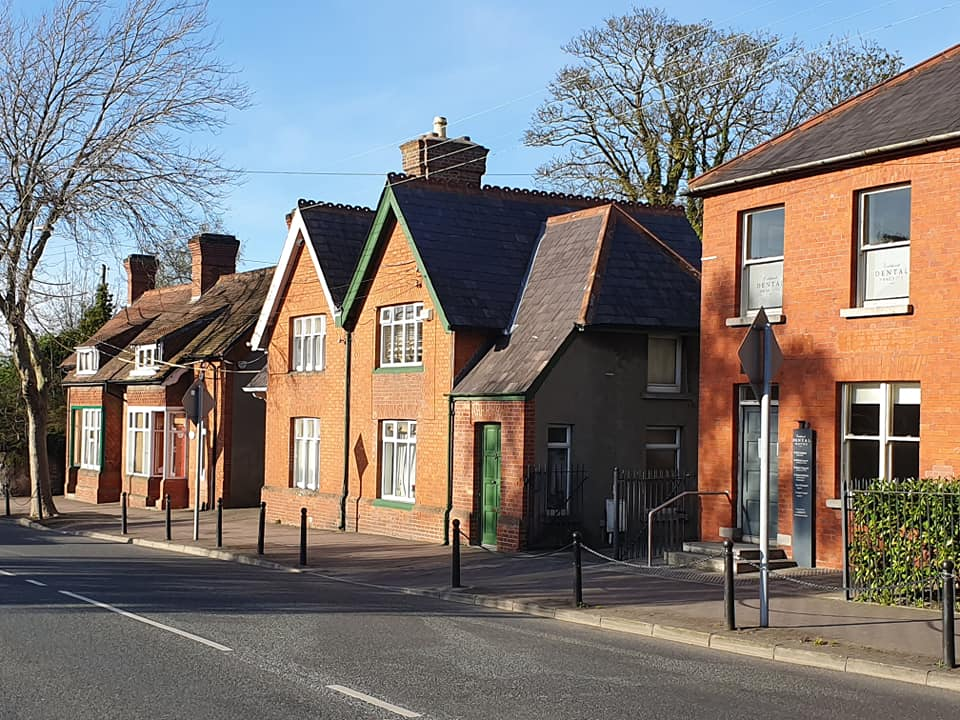
Arts and Crafts style cottages, Main Street, Castleknock

The modern neighbourhood of Castleknock has developed and extended around the old village, which is a busy commercial centre with several supermarkets and other retail outlets. There are several cafes and restaurants, and a post office.

It contains the townlands of Castleknock and Carpenterstown, and the southern part of Diswellstown. It is divided across two electoral divisions.

The neighbourhood is located mostly between Phoenix Park and the Royal Canal. Castleknock is bordered to the west by the large suburb of Blanchardstown and by Ongar, to the east by the Phoenix Park, to the north by Dunsink and to the south by the village of Chapelizod above the Liffey valley. The suburb is in the Dublin 15 postal area.

The area can be accessed from Junction 6 on the M50 motorway, on either side of which it lies, from the R147 Navan Road, from Chesterfield Avenue and the Castleknock Gate of the Phoenix Park, and via Knockmaroon Hill in Chapelizod. Dublin Bus operate a number of services through Castleknock. These include Route 37 which runs from Blanchardstown Town Centre to Wilton Terrace, Baggot Street, and Route 38 from Burlington Road, in the southern part of Dublin city centre, towards Damastown and vice versa.

Irish Rail operate suburban train services on the Western Suburban Railway Line or Maynooth Line from Dublin Connolly to Maynooth. An earlier railway station called Blanchardstown was designed by John Skipton Mulvaney and completed in 1849 at Castleknock. The station was closed in 1937 and the landmark was later demolished in the late 1980s to make way for the M50 motorway. A new modern Castleknock railway station was built close by and opened on 2 July 1990.

The Royal Canal was completed in 1817 to transport freight and passengers from the River Liffey in the City of Dublin to Longford. Having fallen into disuse at the start of the 20th century the canal is now restored and mostly used for pleasure. The canal's 12th lock is located at Castleknock Marina.

The Diswellstown Stream rises in two branches in the area. One branch comes from Carpenterstown, where Bracken Park Drive now lies and is culverted for its first stretch. The other comes from south of Park Avenue in Castleknock village and flows in the open along the western edge of the Castleknock College grounds. The branches come together near the area known as the Sand Holes or Sandpits in Diswellstown, and the stream flows directly south to join the Liffey.

== Education ==
There are three primary schools in the village: Castleknock National School (Church of Ireland), St Brigid's Primary School (Catholic), and Educate Together (non-denominational). Outside the village proper, Scoil Thomáis (co-educational) is located in the Laurel Lodge district, while St Patrick's (co-educational) is in the townland of Diswellstown. A state secondary school, Castleknock Community College (multi-denominational), is located on Carpenterstown Road. A fee-paying secondary school for girls, Mount Sackville, under the care of the Sisters of St. Joseph of Cluny, is located on Tower Road, Knockmaroon Hill, Chapelizod. The suburb is also home to Castleknock College, a voluntary Vincentian secondary school for boys which has produced numerous alumni in the fields of arts, politics, sports, science and business.

== Religion ==
In the Church of Ireland, the church of St Brigid, sited on the ruins of an ancient monastery, is located in the middle of the village. In the Catholic Church, there are two parishes in the area: "Our Lady Mother of the Church", located close to the village and St Thomas the Apostle parish, Laurel Lodge. Both St Brigid's and St Thomas the Apostle contain windows from the Harry Clarke Studios. The window in St Brigid's was commissioned in 1927 by R.F. Brookes of Somerton House, Castleknock, to commemorate members of his family, whereas the Harry Clarke window in St Thomas the Apostle was donated by the Dominican Order after their convent at Dún Laoghaire closed in 1991. It depicts the Immaculate Conception of Mary.

=== Holy wells ===
In the townland of Diswellstown, there is a historic "rag well" - a holy well near which rags were left. Although it still flows, it was "buried" by Dublin County Council, and its site is now marked by a carved flagstone. It used to be attended especially on the eve of 1 May.

A second holy well, dedicated to St Brigid is located near the Church of Ireland church in Castleknock village; its spring, still flowing, has been covered by a pump for many years. Adjacent are stones with two quotations from the Bible. Local tradition held that the water of the well was safe for humans and hazardous for "lower animals".

== Government and representation ==
Castleknock is a local electoral area for elections to Fingal County Council. For national polls, it is in the Dublin West Dáil constituency and for European Parliament elections, the Dublin constituency.

== Gallery ==
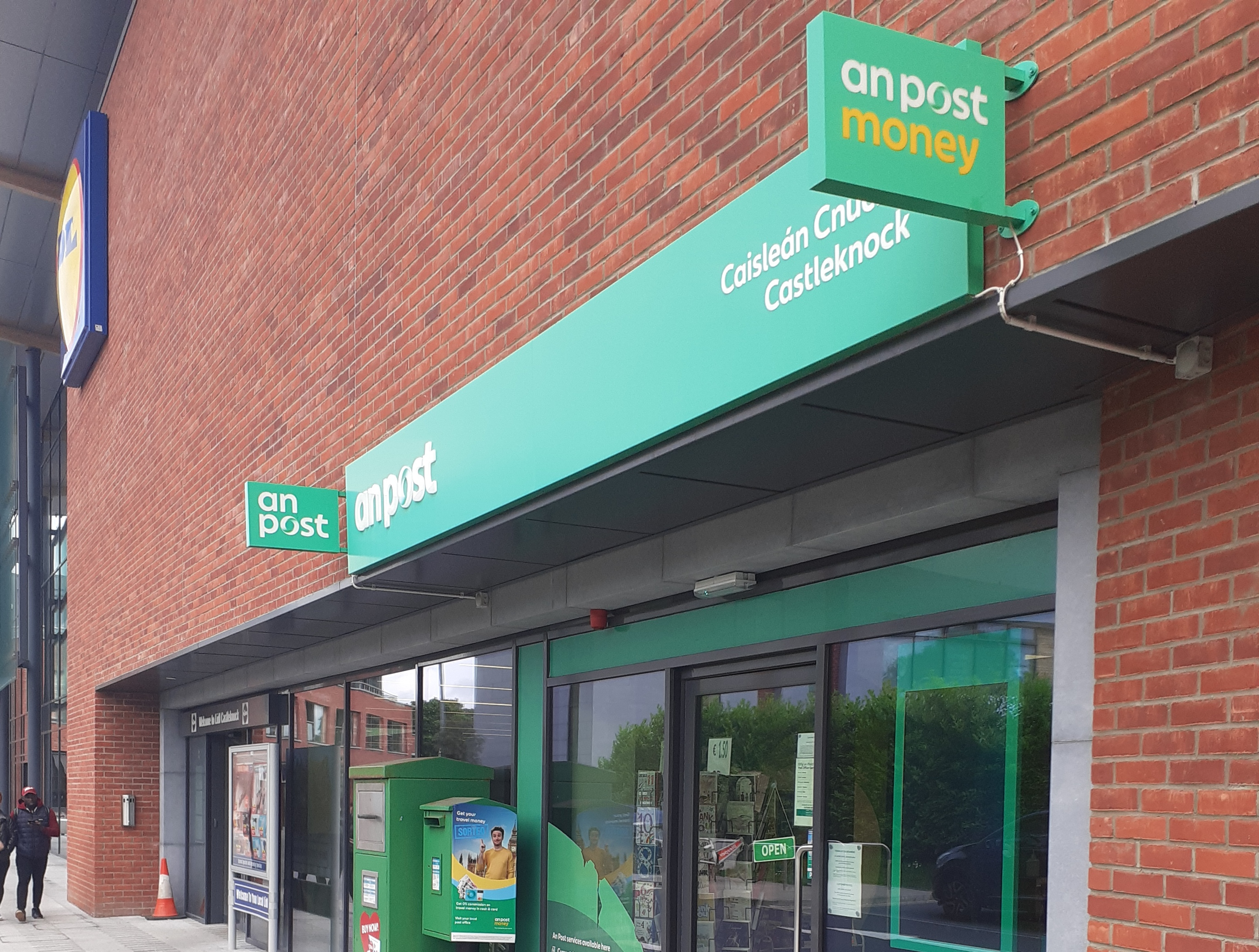
Castleknock Post Office

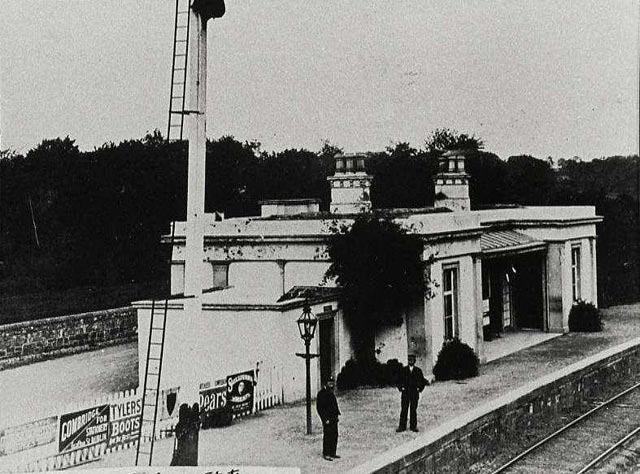
Old Railway Station, Castleknock (now demolished)

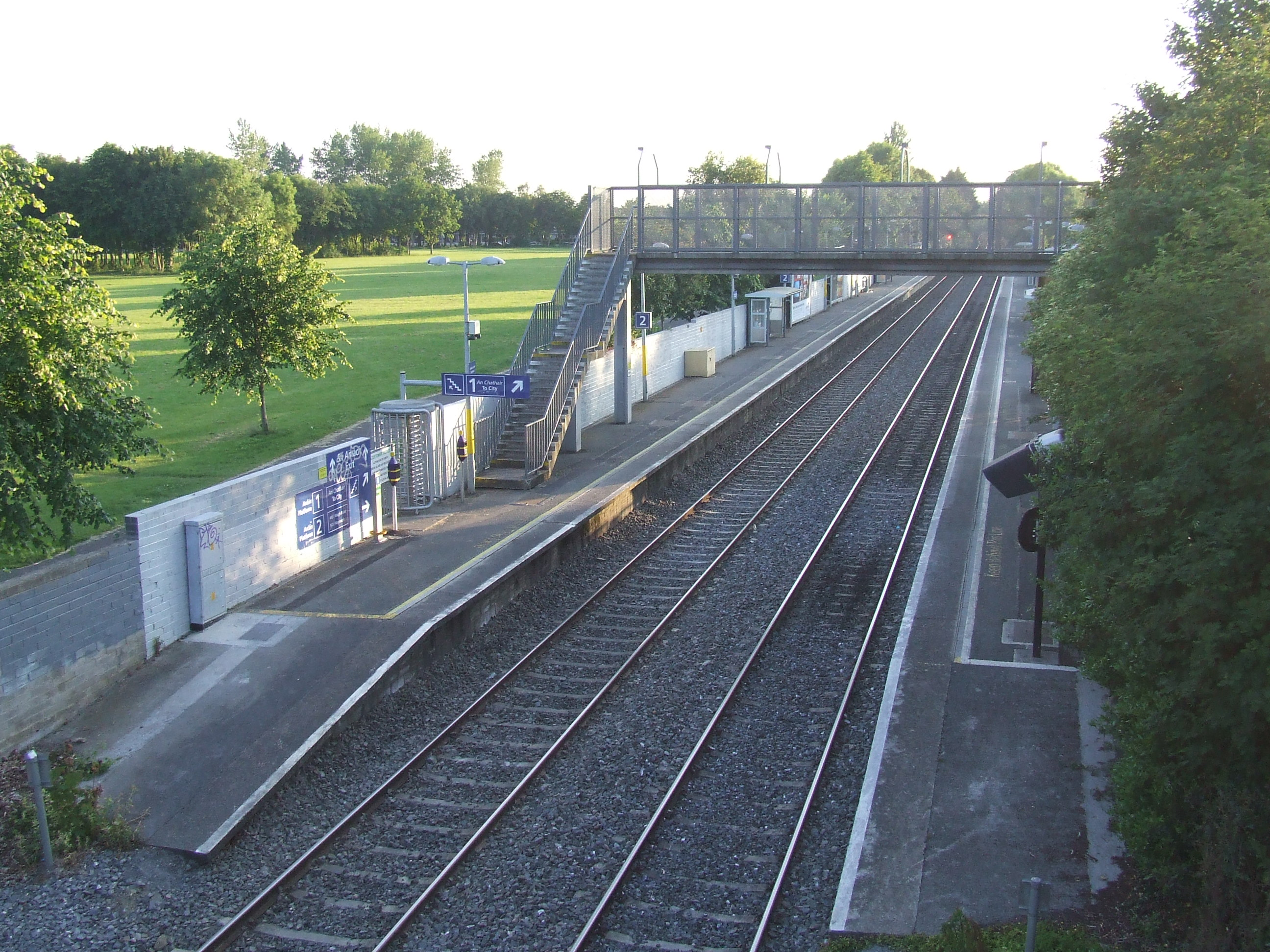
Castleknock train station

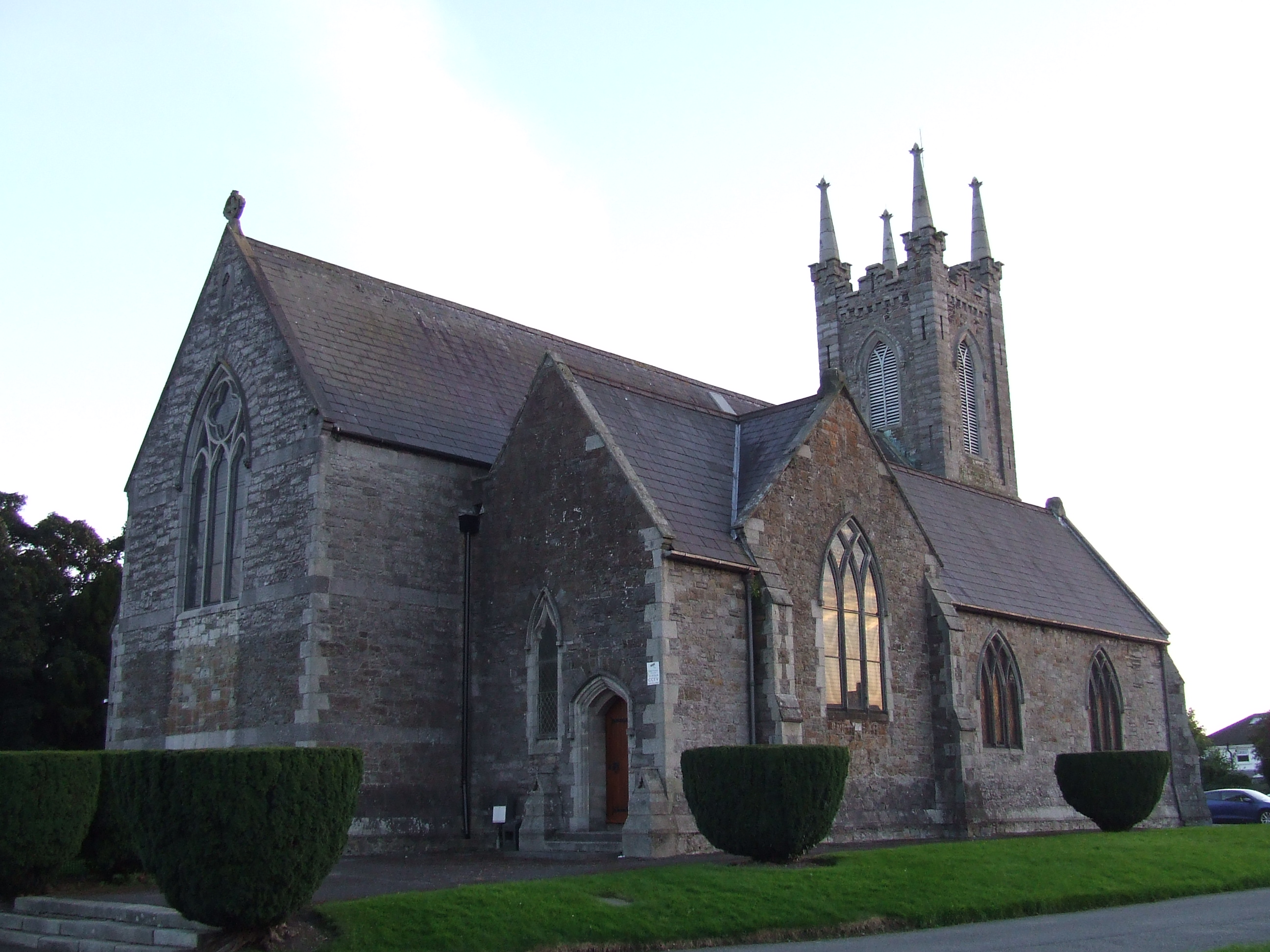
"St. Brigid's" Church of Ireland church

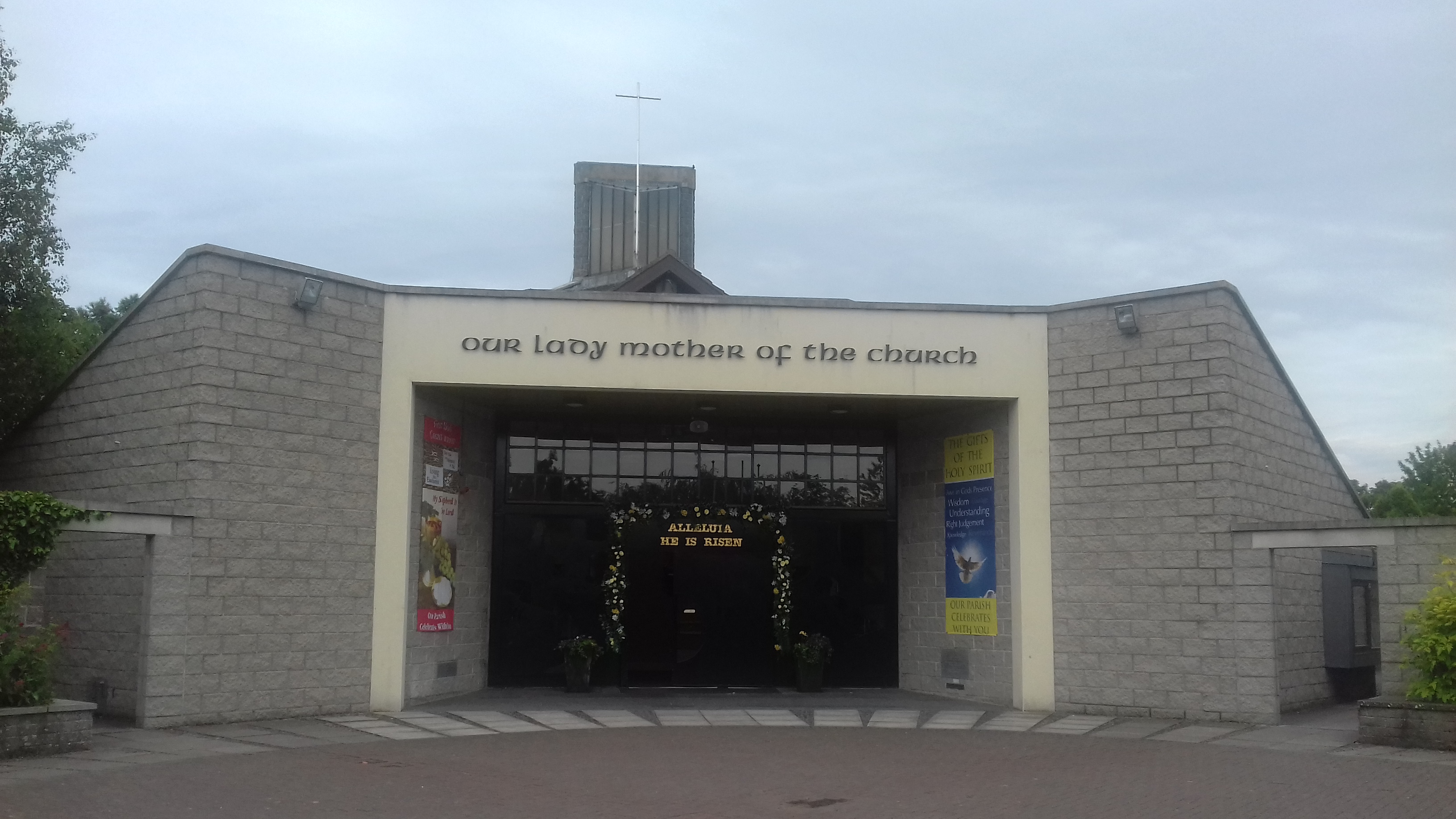
"Our Lady Mother of the Church" Catholic church

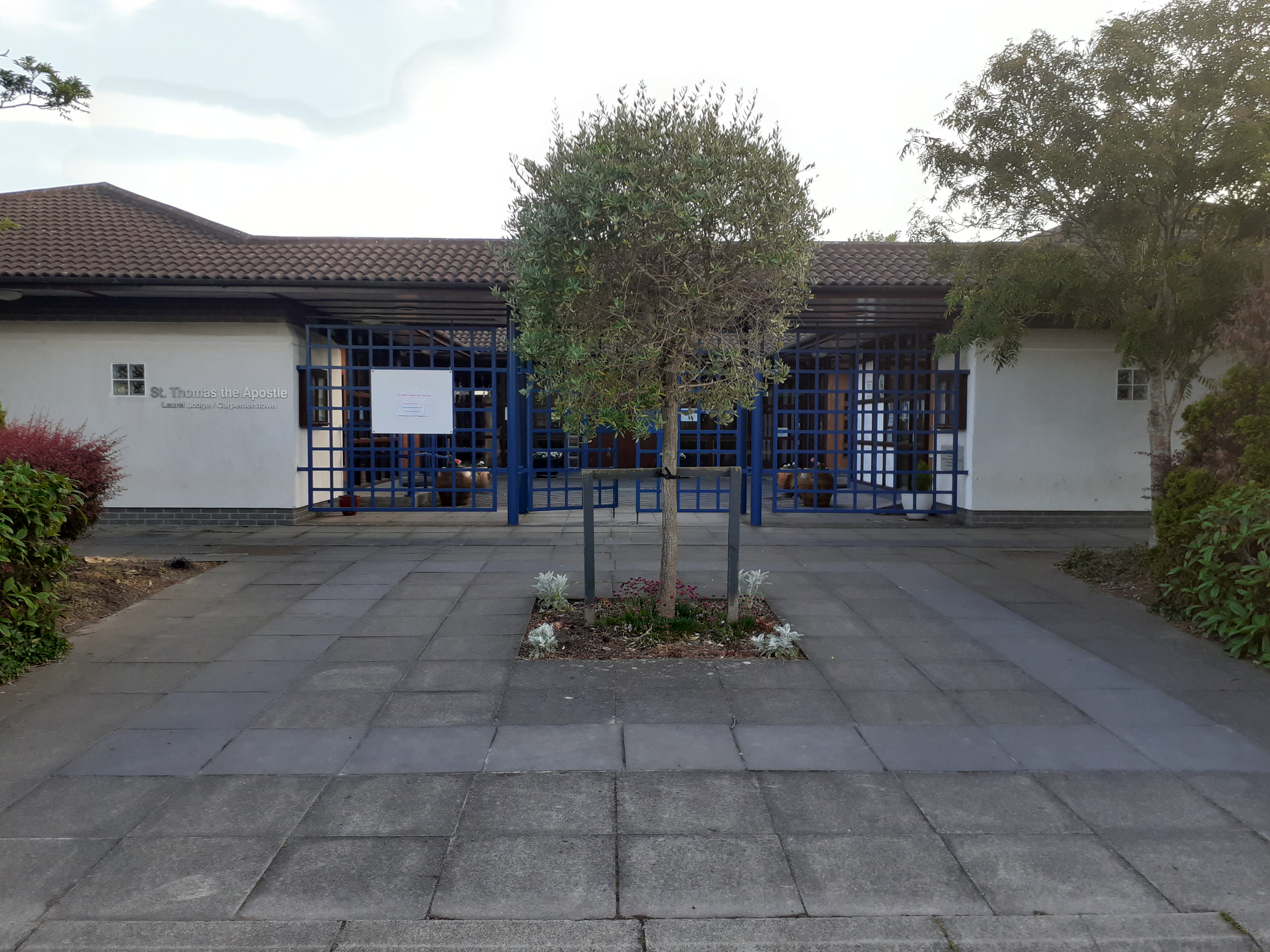
St. Thomas the Apostle Church, Laurel Lodge

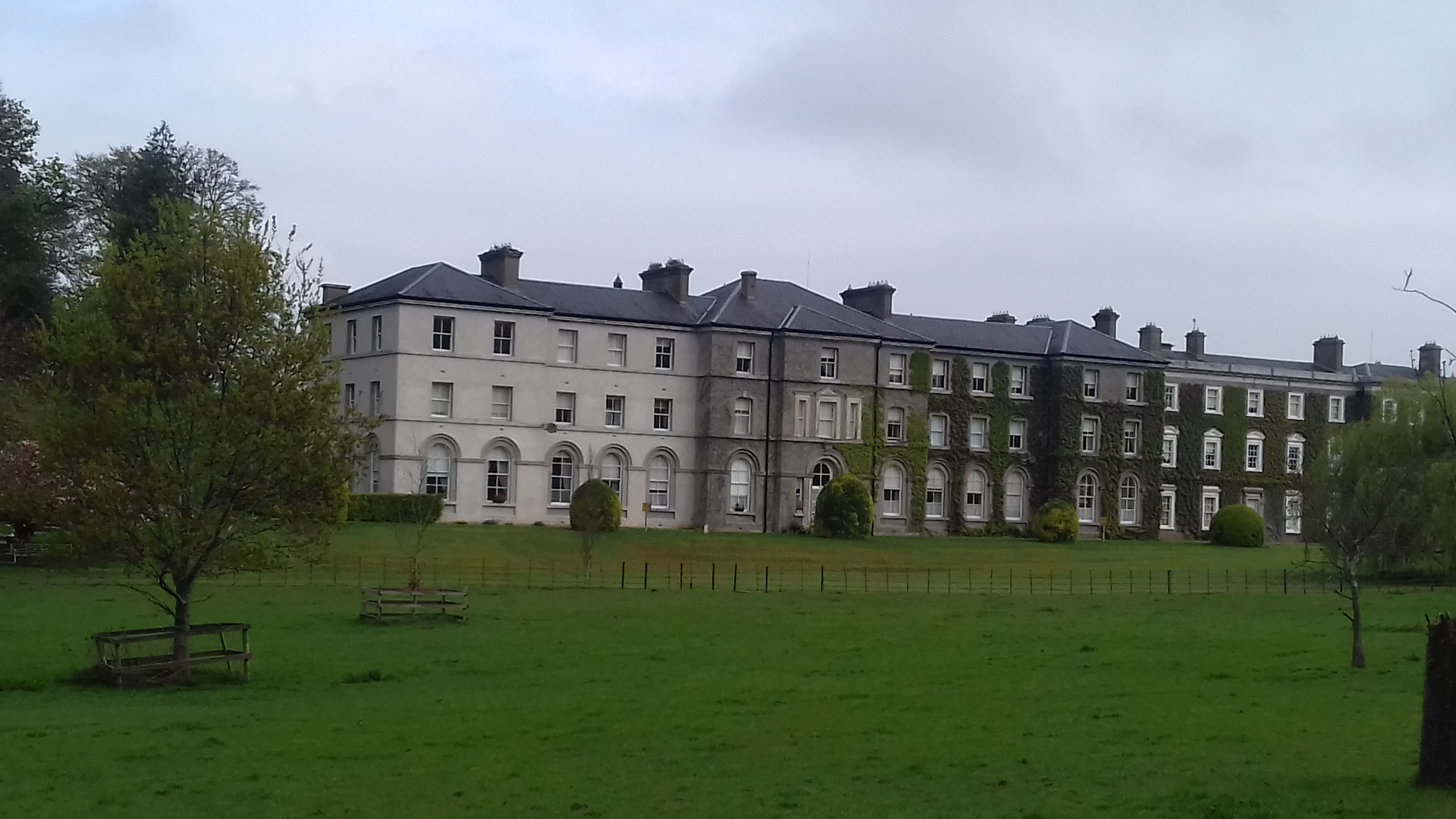
Castleknock College viewed from the Carpenterstown Road

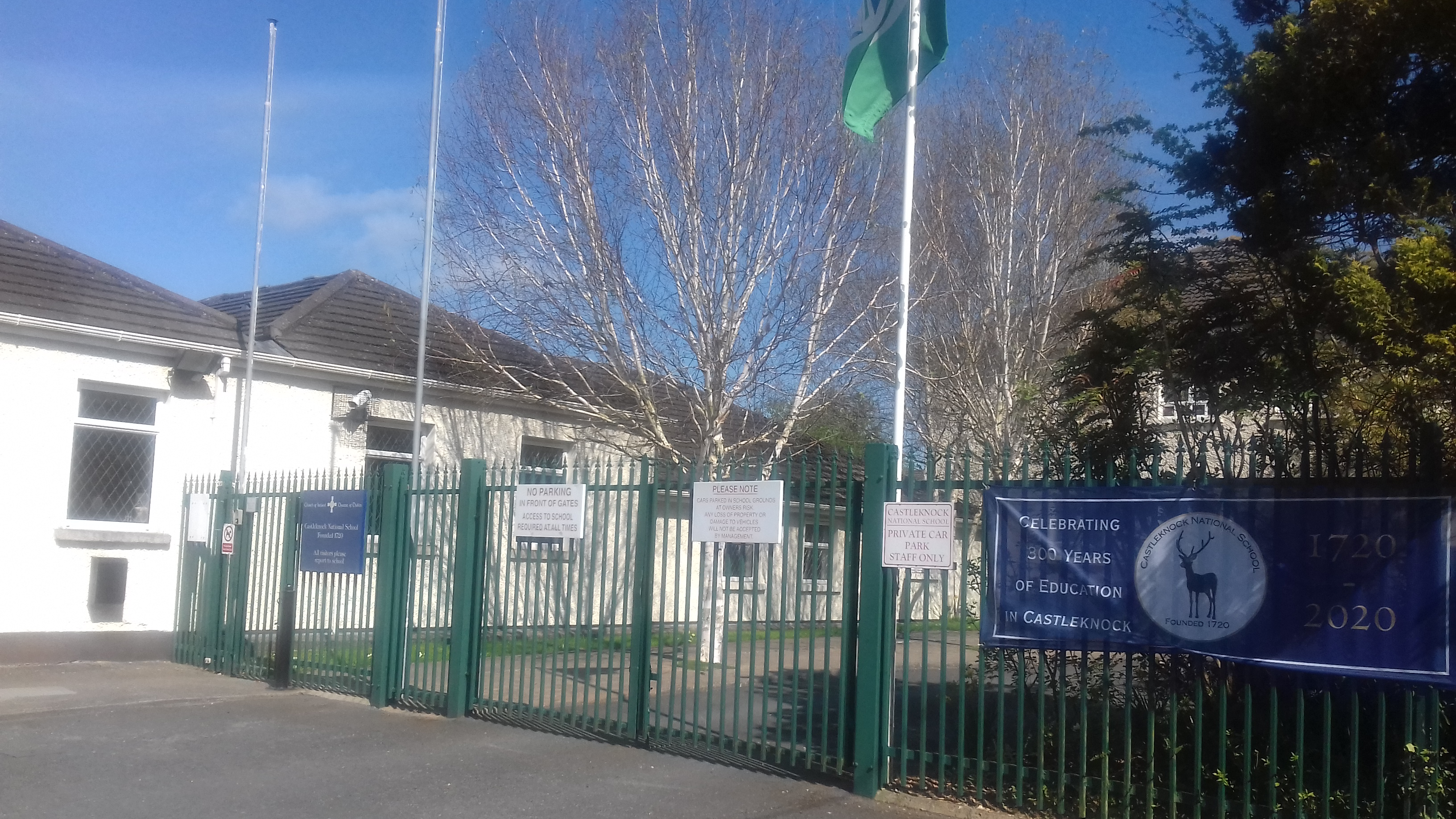
Church of Ireland primary school, on its 300th anniversary

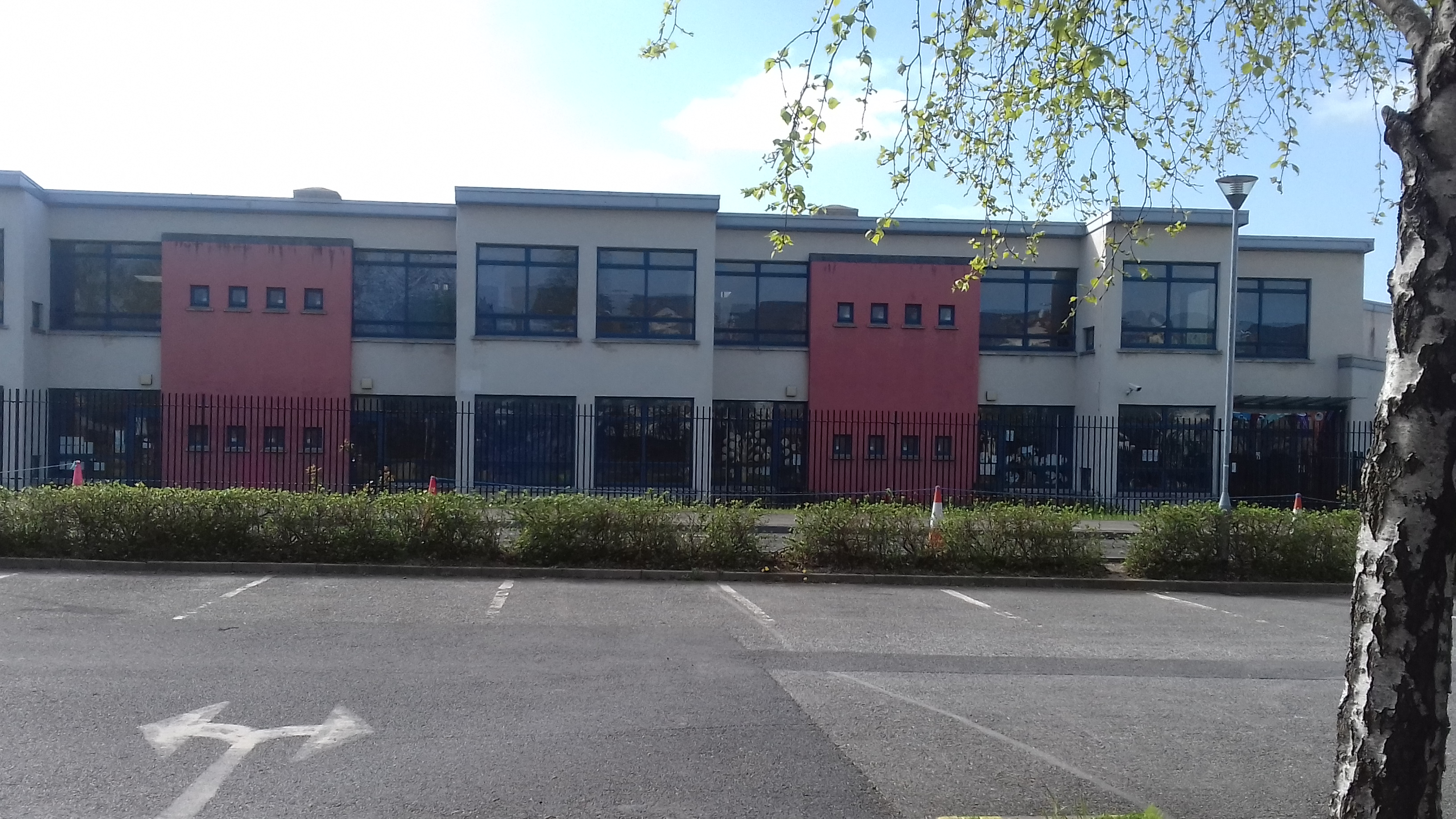
"Educate Together" national school, Beechpark Avenue

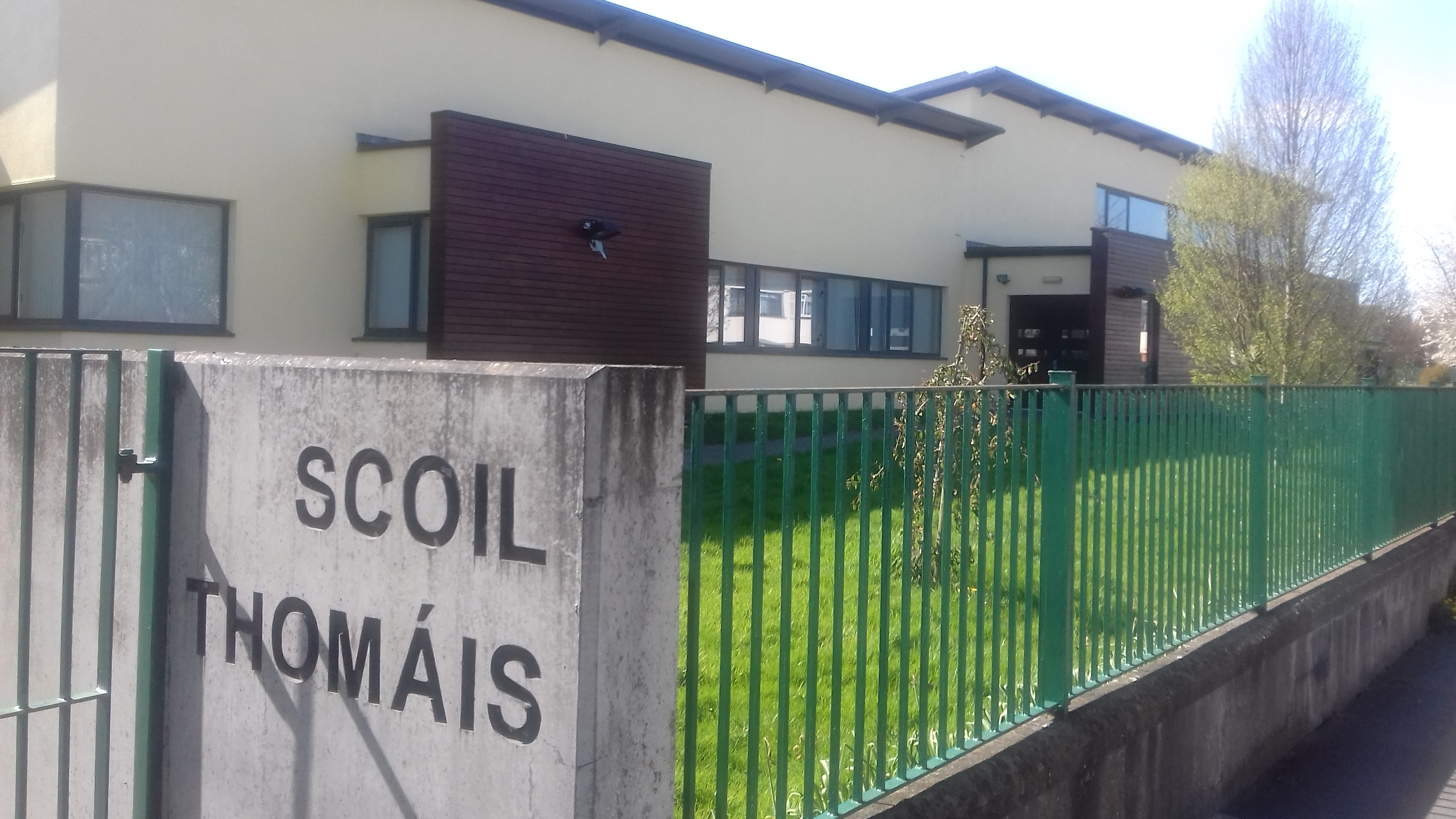
Scoil Thomáis national school, Laurel Lodge

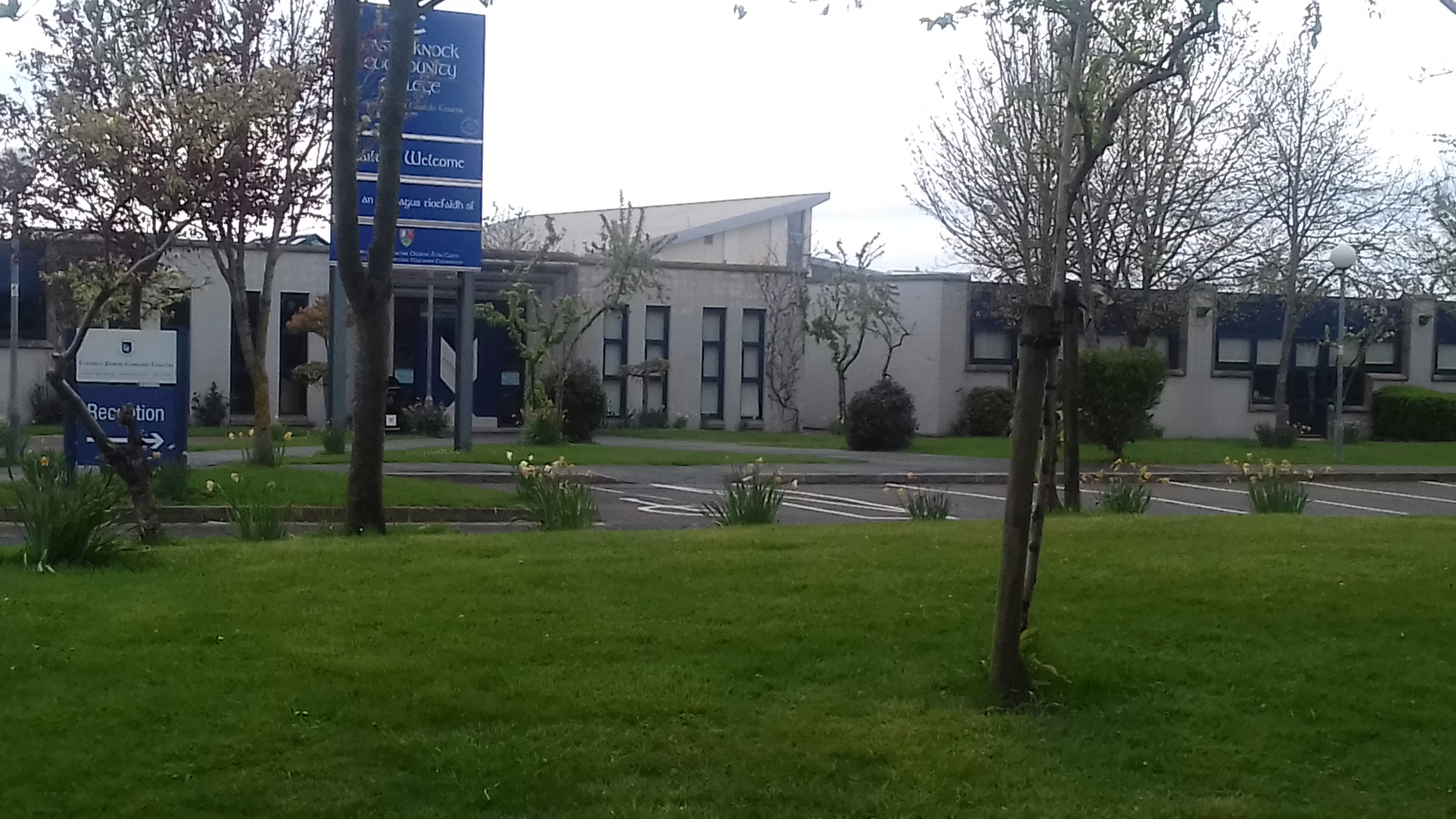
Castleknock Community College, Carpenterstown

== See also ==
- List of towns and villages in Ireland
