= Castleknock Community College =

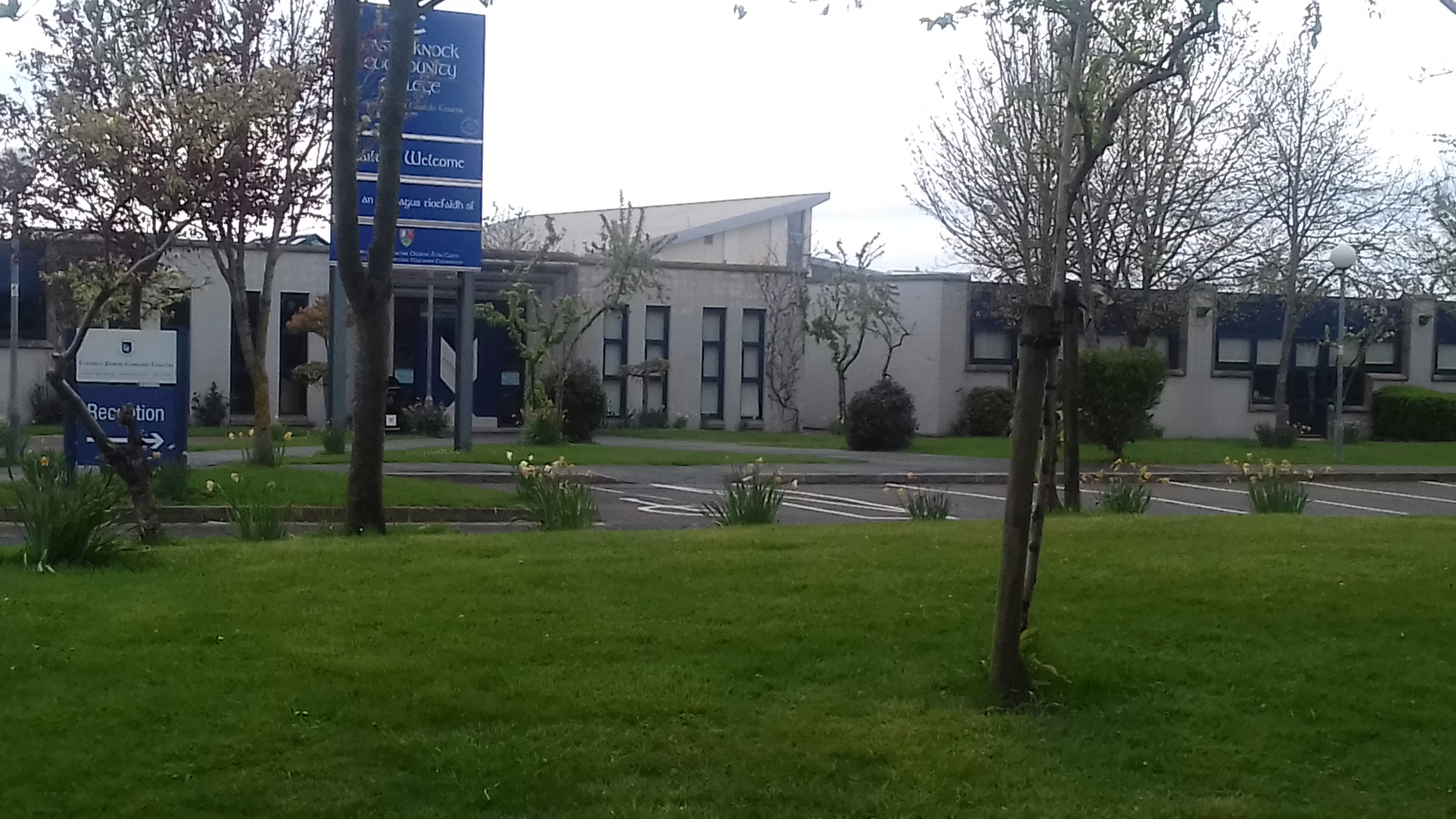
- Entrance to Castleknock Community College

Location
- Carpenterstown Road; Castleknock, County Dublin, D15 A996; Ireland; 53.3718°N 6.3902°W

Information
- Other name: CCC, Coláiste Pobail Caisleán Cnucha
- Type: Community college of the Dublin and Dún Laoghaire Education and Training Board
- Motto: Irish: Mol an Óige agus Tiocfaidh Sí (Praise the Youth and they will Flourish)
- Religious affiliation: Multi-denominational
- Established: 1995; 31 years ago
- Local authority: Fingal County Council
- Oversight: Dublin and Dún Laoghaire Education and Training Board
- Chairman of the Board of Management: Cllr. John Walsh
- Principal: John Cronin
- Gender: Co-educational
- Age range: 12–19
- Enrolment: 1,200
- Colours: Teal and Blue
- Website: www.castleknockcc.ie

Castleknock Community College, is an Irish secondary school located on Carpenterstown Road in Castleknock, County Dublin, Ireland. Established in 1995, the school is overseen by the Dublin & Dún Laoghaire Education and Training Board.

== History ==
The school opened on 30 August 1995 in temporary accommodation at Hartstown Community School. An official visit by the Minister for Education, Niamh Bhreathnach, took place in December 1996. The first students sat the Leaving Certificate examination in June 2000. As of 2013, the school had an enrollment of over 1,100 students, and a teaching staff of 94 full-time and part-time teachers.

After a number of years of campaigning and protest, the school received previously promised funding in 2014 for a new sports hall and classrooms. Construction began in April 2014 and was completed in June 2015, with the new building opened in September 2015.

== Operations ==
Castleknock Community College (or 'CCC' as it is sometimes known) is a co-educational post-primary school, with a comprehensive academic curriculum and a programme of extra-curricular activities.

The school also offers adult education classes.
