= Charles Castleman =

Charles Castleman may refer to:

- Charles Castleman (solicitor) (1807–1876), English solicitor
- Charles Castleman (violinist) (born 1941), American violinist
