= Christ Church, Emery Down =

Church in Emery Down, Hampshire, England

Christ Church
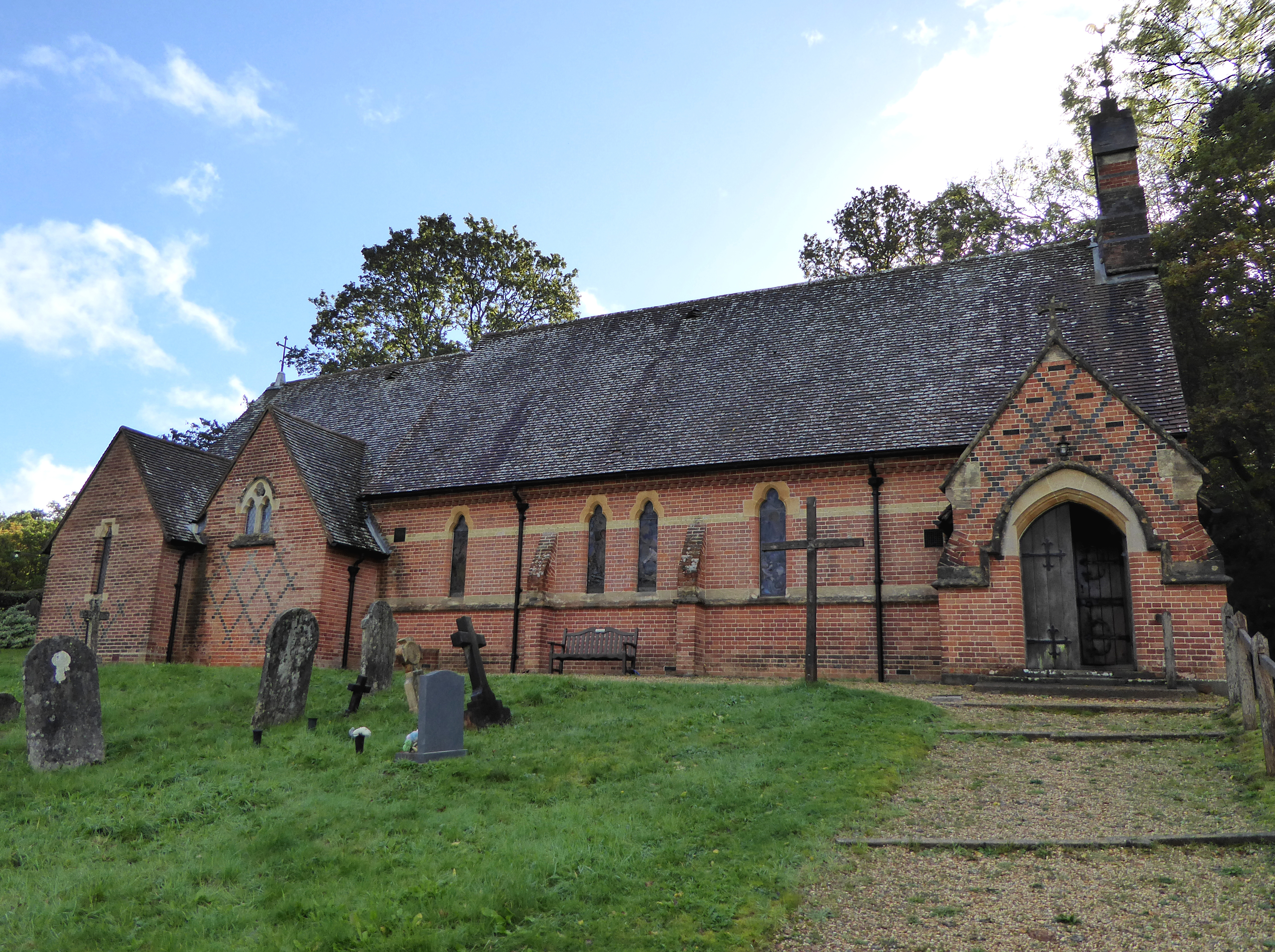

Religion
- Affiliation: Church of England
- Ecclesiastical or organizational status: Active
- Year consecrated: 1864

Location
- Location: Emery Down, Hampshire, England
- Interactive map of Christ Church
- Coordinates: 50°52′26″N 1°35′36″W

Architecture
- Architect: William Butterfield
- Type: Church

Christ Church is a Church of England church in Emery Down, Hampshire, England. Designed by William Butterfield, it was constructed between 1863 and 1864. The church has been a Grade II listed building since 1987.

== History ==
Christ Church was built to serve the scattered parts of the parish of Lyndhurst, including the hamlets of Emery Down and Bank. Although the parish church, St Michael and All Angels, had opened shortly beforehand, replacing an earlier church, it was considered unable to comfortably accommodate the entire congregation and was also criticised for being drafty and cold. As a resident of Emery Down, Admiral Frederick Moore Boultbee recognised the need for a church and funded the construction of Christ Church entirely at his own expense. The church cost approximately £1,300 to build, and the Admiral also provided an endowment of £1,700.

The plans for the church were drawn up by William Butterfield of London, with Messrs. Hillary of Andover hired as the builders. Construction began in mid-1863, and the church was consecrated by the Bishop of Winchester, the Right Rev. Charles Sumner, on 26 May 1864. With the completion of the church, Emery Down became a separate ecclesiastical parish distinct from Lyndhurst.

== Architecture ==
Christ Church is built of local brick with Bath stone dressings and a tiled roof. Red brick is predominately used, with some diapering using blue brick. Designed to accommodate 165 persons, the church is made up of a nave, chancel, organ chamber, vestry and north-west porch. There is a bellcote containing a single bell at the west end. The floor of the nave is laid with red and black squared tiles, and the chancel laid with encaustic tiles from Mintons. Fittings include the pews of stained deal, the lectern and altar table of oak, and the pulpit, which is placed on a pedestal of Bath stone. A wall tablet was installed in the church in 1915 in memory of Admiral Boultbee, who died in 1876.
