= Portuguese Fireplace =

War memorial in Hampshire, England

The Portuguese Fireplace
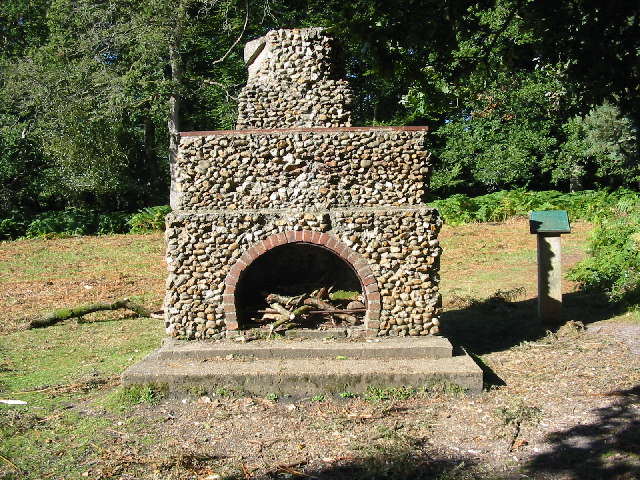
- The Portuguese Fireplace
- Interactive map of The Portuguese Fireplace
- Location: New Forest; United Kingdom
- Coordinates: 50°52′08.36″N 001°37′26.81″W

The Portuguese Fireplace is a war memorial in the New Forest National Park, near the village of Lyndhurst, Hampshire, England. It is located on the road between Bolderwood and Emery Down, approximately 2 km (1 mi) from the latter. It is near Millyford Bridge and is used as a Waymark. Because it was also operated by the Canadian Forestry Corps, it is also referred to locally as the Canadian Fireplace.

== Plaque ==
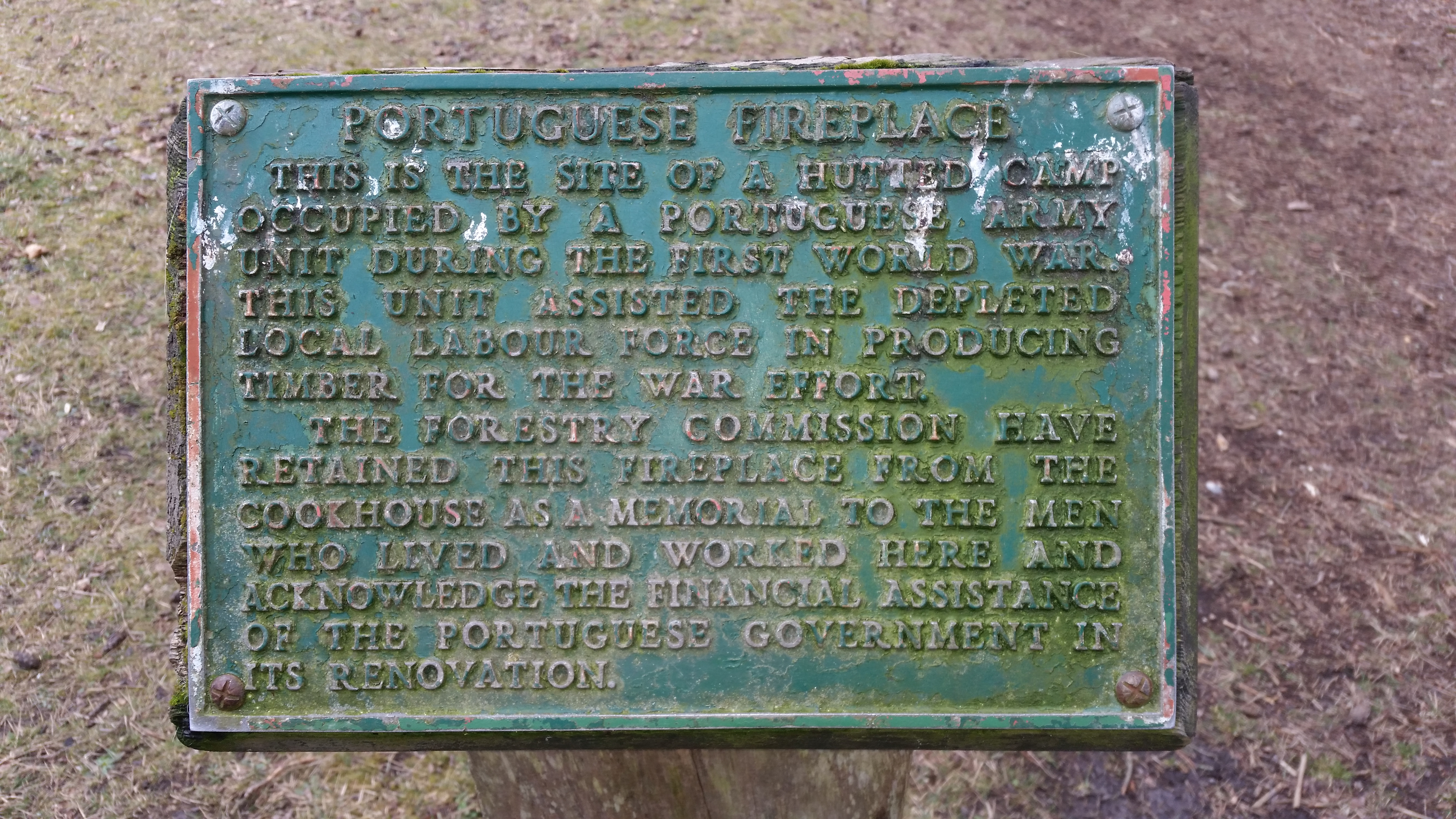
Plaque located next to the Portuguese fireplace

Next to the memorial was a plaque explaining the significance of the fireplace which read:

This is the site of a hutted camp occupied by a Portuguese army unit during the first World War. This unit assisted the depleted local labour force in producing timber for the war effort. The Forestry Commission have retained the fireplace from the cookhouse as a memorial to the men who lived and worked here and acknowledge the financial assistance of the Portuguese government in its renovation.

In World War I, local labour was in short supply due to the war effort. In order to help with the timber production for the war, a Portuguese Army unit with the Canadian Timber Corps helped the local population whilst local foresters were away fighting. The fireplace is what remains of the cookhouse of the camp of those people who lived, worked and helped out in the area.

== History of the camp ==
On 15 February 1916, 18 months after the beginning of the First World War, the Colonial Secretary cabled to the then Governor- General of Canada, H.R.H. the Duke of Connaught, that Canadian timber could no longer be imported on a large enough scale to meet requirements for the war as there was not enough freight for munitions, food, forage and other essential items due to the scarce number of people available. This required the felling of English forests and woodlands in order to meet the requirements. Of chief concern was finding enough skilled labour, in particular, fellers, hauliers and sawyers. Therefore, they requested that a First Battalion of Lumbermen be formed of 1500 Canadian workers to come over to Great Britain to help out. The Canadian government was quick to respond and sent them over in batches.

To save time, the Canadians brought over their own equipment and modifications were made to adapt to being in Britain. The differences in conditions were so great between Canada and Britain that it required highly expert knowledge to carry out the changes. This was done very quickly and few changes then had to be made again.

The Canadian lumbermen were of unknown quantity as were the conditions in Britain to the Canadians. An initial advance party of 15 Canadians set up in a camp near Lyndhurst. The actual first 400 Canadians set up in the South of England to facilitate organisation with later contingents setting up elsewhere in the UK.

In 1917–1918, the Canadian Forestry Corps received help from Portuguese labourers. A typical encampment was 4 to 5 acres (20,000 m^{2}) in size. The camp was surrounded by four fences of various sizes and also included a mess room, canteen, sleeping quarters, wash and bath houses, tailors' and boot shops, laundry, drying room, cookhouse, hospital and non-commissioned officer's quarters and electricity was included. Guards were positioned at wooden and barbed wire gates as well as strategic points around the camp. There were 25 huts on site for workshops and various other uses.

At the height of the camp's usage there were around 100 Portuguese and 200 Canadian and associated workers on site. Light railways were built by the Canadians with a single locomotive, and this helped to speed up the timber production. The Canadians moved from a camp in Norley Wood in the south of the New Forest and were better equipped for the environment than were the Portuguese, who at one point went on strike because they were not even given oilskins. The Canadians were better equipped than the Portuguese.

Special arrangements had to be made so that Canadians and Portuguese got abundant food and the food they required as there was a difference in diversity. The Portuguese required a diet of largely fish, bread, potatoes, beans, rice and olive oil as well as green vegetables and onions. Eventually it was decided that Portuguese were better used for other work than timber as the workers found best suited were Finnish and prisoners of war.
