= Bolderwood, Hampshire =

Part of the New Forest, Hampshire, England

Coordinates: 50.861111°N 1.643889°W

Bolderwood
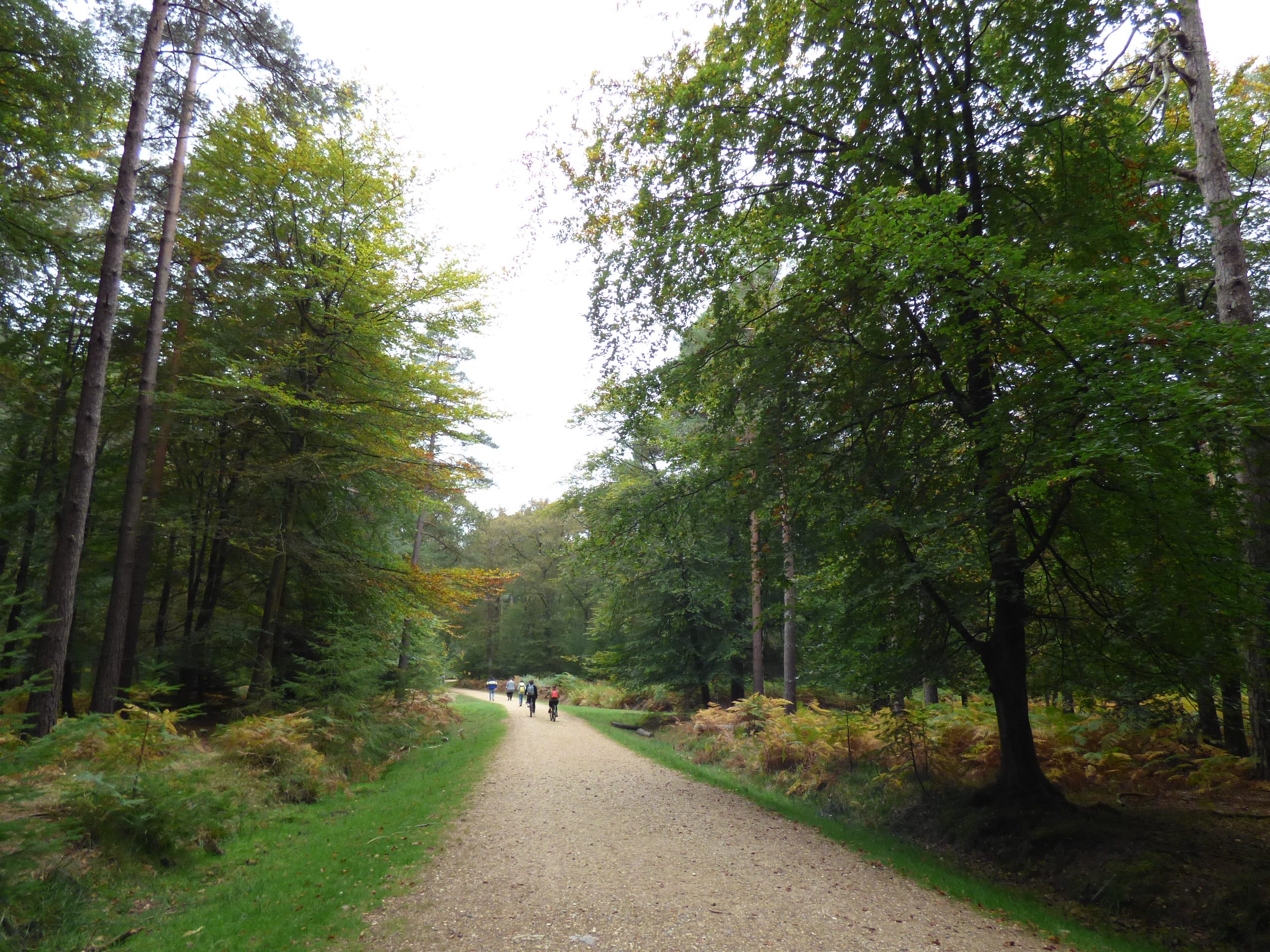
- Bolderwood Deer Sanctuary

- Location within Hampshire
- District: New Forest
- Shire county: Hampshire
- Region: South East
- Country: England
- Sovereign state: United Kingdom
- Post town: lyndhurst
- Postcode district: SO
- Dialling code: 01590
- Police: Hampshire and Isle of Wight
- Fire: Hampshire and Isle of Wight
- Ambulance: South Central
- UK Parliament: New Forest West

Bolderwood is an area of the New Forest in Hampshire. Bolderwood hosts a deer sanctuary with a public deer observation platform. As a result, the public car park at Bolderwood is the most visited in the New Forest. From here the Bolderwood Arboretum Ornamental Drive links to the A35 passing close to the Knightwood Oak, one of the largest trees in the New Forest. A nearby feature is the Portuguese Fireplace.
