= Bisterne Dragon =

English legend

The Bisterne Dragon is a legend from the New Forest in England. The story takes place primarily in Bisterne, but also features Burley and Lyndhurst, and is one of the area's most famous pieces of folklore.

== Legend ==
The local tradition is that a dragon had his den at Burley Beacon, about 3 miles (4.8 km) east of Bisterne, at Burley. There are several versions of the tale, one being that the creature "flew" every morning to Bisterne, where it would be supplied with milk. In order to kill the dragon, a valiant knight (usually named Berkeley) built a hide, and with two dogs lay in wait. The creature came as usual one morning for its milk, and when the hut door was opened the dogs attacked it, and while thus engaged the knight took the dragon by surprise, the dogs dying in the affray. The dragon slayer himself, says another version of the tale, only succeeded by covering his armour with glass, and a popular telling of the story has it that the fight raged throughout the forest, with the dragon finally dying outside the village of Lyndhurst, his corpse turning into a hill (now known as Boltons Bench). Though the knight had defeated the dragon he had been mentally broken by the battle, and after thirty days and thirty nights he went back to Boltons Bench to die alone atop it, his yew-wood bow falling on the ground beside his body and eventually sprouting into the yew tree which can still be seen today.

== Source and original text ==
The documentary version of this tradition is contained in the margin of a pedigree roll written prior to 1618, and preserved at Berkeley Castle. It actually names the dragon-slayer as Sir Maurice Berkeley, lord of the manor of Bisterne in the 15th century:

Sir Moris Barkley the sonne of Sir John Barkley, of Beverston, beinge a man of great strength and courage, in his tyme there was bread in Hampshire neere Bistherne a devouring Dragon, who doing much mischief upon men and cattell and could not be destroyed but spoiled many in attempting it, making his den neere unto a Beacon. This Sir Moris Barkley armed himself and encountered with it and at length overcam and killed it but died himself soone after. This is the common saying even to this day in those parts of Hampshire, and the better to approve the same his children and posterity even to this present do beare for their creast a Dragon standing before a burning beacon. Wch seemeth the rather more credible because Sir Morice Barkley did beare the Miter with this authentick seale of his armes as is heare underneath one of his owen deedes exprest bearing date ye 10 of Henry 6. An Dni 1431.

== Topography ==
The alleged scene of the fight in Bisterne is still called "Dragon Fields"; while over the front of Bisterne Manor in a carving of the Berkeley and Betteshorn arms dated 1652, the beacon and dragon may be seen. Boltons Bench at Lyndhurst is a well known local landmark, still with yew trees growing atop it, and is featured as the main symbol for the village. The inn of Bisterne (closed 1873) was called the Green Dragon. Other local inns which may reflect this tradition include the Green Dragon at Brook, 11 miles (18 km) to the northeast, and the Green Dragon at Alderbury, 17 miles (27 km) to the north.

It is possible the dragon had some foundation in fact, and that it was a wild beast (such as a wild boar) living in and around the New Forest. The Bisterne Dragon is mentioned several times in the novel The Forest by Edward Rutherfurd.
