= Richard Fitzgeorge de Stacpoole, 1st Duke de Stacpoole =

Duc de Stacpoole

Personal details
- Born: 16 August 1787
- Died: 7 July 1848 (aged 60) Glasshayes, Lyndhurst, Hampshire, New Forest
- Spouse: Elizabeth Tulloch

Richard Fitzgeorge de Stacpoole, 1st Duc de Stacpoole (16 August 1787 – 7 July 1848) was an Anglo-French Catholic aristocrat and member of the French peerage.

The son of George Stacpoole, 1st Comte Stacpoole (created by letters patent of Louis XVIII of France on 21 July 1818), and Catherine Gingell, he did his catechism at St Patrick's Church, Soho Square, attended Rugby School, and studied at Christ Church, Oxford (though left without a degree). On his father's death he inherited half of his estate (per the practice of the French courts), taking as Vicomte de Stacpoole the French peerage title of 2nd Comte Stacpoole on 25 March 1824. He had married Elizabeth Tulloch, daughter of Major Francis Tulloch and Margaret Simpson, at St Marylebone Parish Church in 1822, and the couple moved to Rome where they lived extravagantly, reportedly spending £40,000. They financed repairs to the main bridge over the Tiber, helped to rebuild the Basilica of Saint Paul Outside the Walls, and restored numerous ornamental fountains which had been derelict since the time of Napoleon.

Richard was created a Marquis by Pope Leo XII on 21 February 1826 and 1st Duke of Stacpoole by Pope Gregory XVI in May 1831. Though the family was Anglo-Irish, Richard never lived in Ireland, dividing his life between England, France and Italy. In 1846, estranged from his wife and children, he purchased and greatly enlarged Glasshayes (which still stands), in Lyndhurst, New Forest. He lived there happily with close friends Captain and Mrs Graves, leaving the house (alongside the bulk of his £68,833 estate) to them when he died at Glasshayes in 1848. His wife contested the will, but later settled out of court. Much of the Duc's furniture and some of his paintings are held today in the Wallace Collection, London.

== Folklore ==
According to local tradition, the Duc de Stacpoole's ghost still haunts his old mansion of Glasshayes in the New Forest. Sightings have been reported by builders working on extensions to the site, both at the beginning of the 20th century (when it was converted to the Lyndhurst Park Hotel) and in the 1970s, apparently berating and sometimes attacking them for disturbing his property. Supposedly, every year on the night of his death (7 July) strange music can be heard in certain rooms, and legend has it that this is from a grand ball that the Duc holds annually for the dead.

== Issue ==
- Count Hubert de Stacpoole
- Francis Xavier de Stacpoole
- Georgina de Stacpoole
- Elizabeth de Stacpoole
- Gertrude de Stacpoole
- Clothilde Stacpoole
- Richard de Stacpoole, 2nd Duc de Stacpoole (1828–1878)
- Reverend George Marie Stanislas Koska de Stacpoole, 3rd Duc de Stacpoole, KGCHS (1829–1896)
