= Knightwood Oak =

Coordinates: 50°51′26″N 1°37′22″W

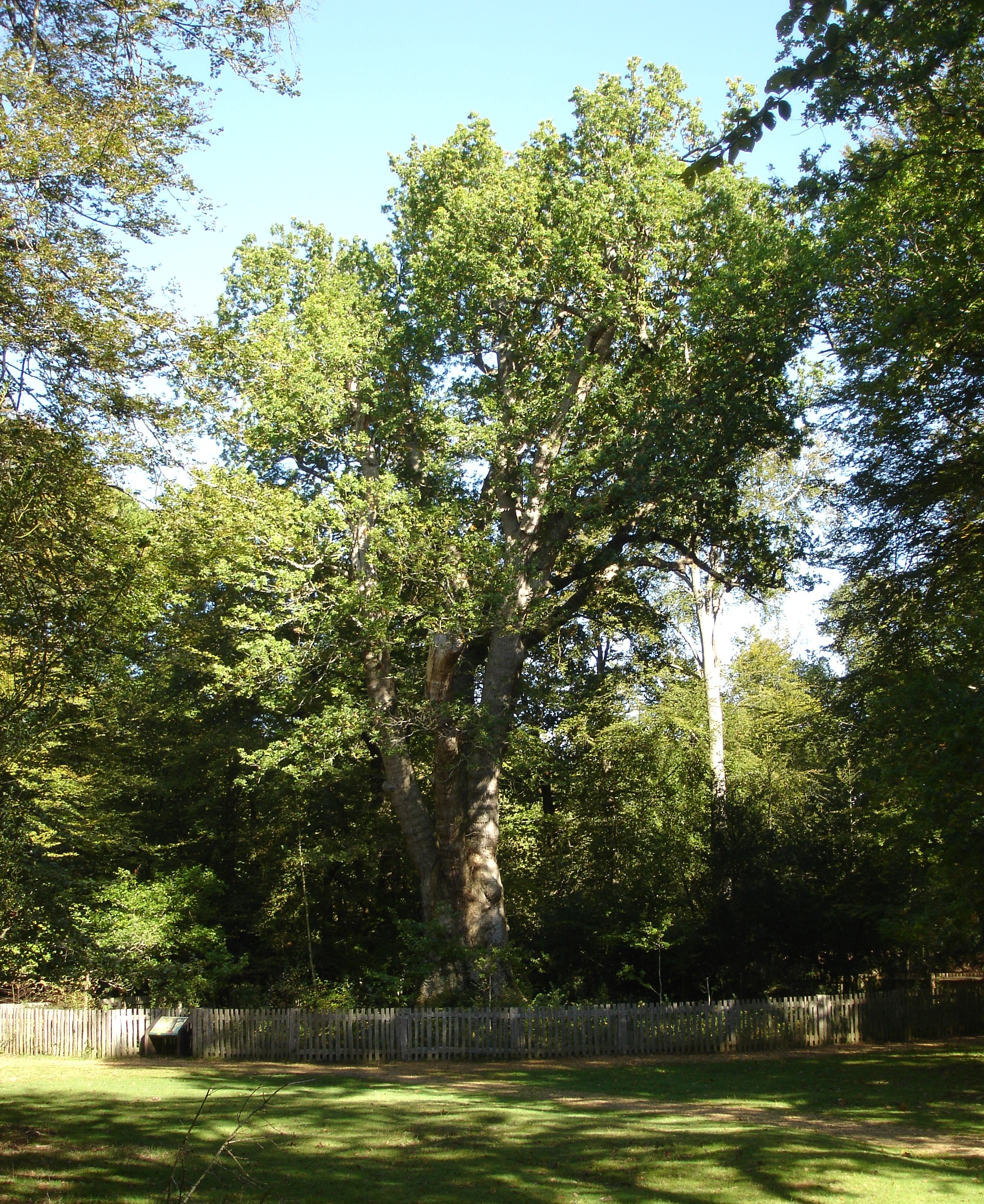
The Knightwood Oak in early October 2007

The Knightwood Oak is a pedunculate oak and the largest, and perhaps most famous, oak tree in the New Forest, in southern England. It is also known as the Queen of the Forest. It is over 500 years old and has a girth of 7.38 metres (24.2 ft). The tree is still growing. It was pollarded when about 200 years old and is thought to have been last pollarded in the mid 19th century.

The tree is located about 2.4 miles (3.9 km) WSW of Lyndhurst and just north of the A35 road at grid reference SU265065. There is a car park nearby and a gravel path, suitable for wheelchairs, leads to and around the tree. An interpretative panel explains the tree's history. A fence encircles the tree to protect its roots from soil compaction due to foot traffic. The tree has been popular with visitors for a long time and at the height of its fame, in Victorian times, people would come from far and wide to see it. It is even reputed to have been visited by Henry VIII during a hunting expedition in the forest.

In February 2006, Forestry England harvested twigs from the tree to produce new ‘Knightwood’ oaks with identical genes. Some will be planted near the original tree, while others will go to New Park, near Brockenhurst.

== See also ==
- List of individual trees
