= Glasshayes =

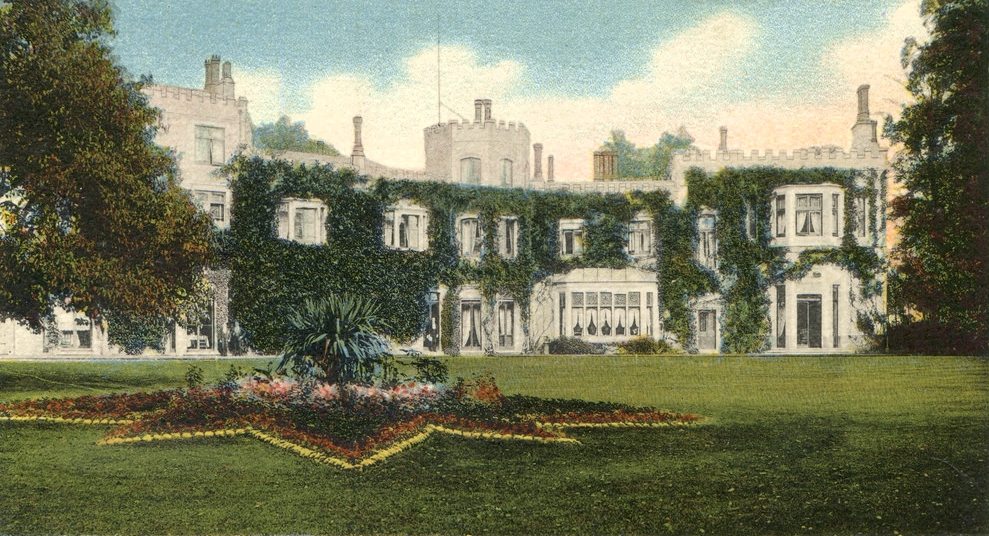
- Glasshayes in the early 20th century
- Interactive map of the Glasshayes area

General information
- Status: Scheduled for demolition
- Location: 78 High Street, Lyndhurst, Hampshire, SO43 7NL
- Coordinates: 50.87202°N 1.57206°W
- Opened: early 19th century (retaining material from earlier building)
- Owner: PegasusLife

Glasshayes House is a historic country house in Lyndhurst, in The New Forest, Hampshire. Used in the 20th century as the Grand Hotel, then the Lyndhurst Park Hotel, it exists today in the form of a 1912 redesign by Sir Arthur Conan Doyle. The building and estate was purchased in 2014 by developers who sought to demolish it wholesale. In 2017 an application was made to have the hotel listed. Demolition of the remaining parts of the hotel started in December 2024.

== History ==
=== 18th century ===
Glasshayes is first mentioned by name a conveyance document of 1728. At this stage in its history the land is mainly agricultural, with a cluster of smaller 17th and 18th century vernacular properties in the location of the current house. In 1763 the estate was purchased by Arthur Phillip, along with Black Acre and Vernalls, and he lived in the area with his first wife Charlotte, farming the land until 1769 when Phillip returned to service in Australia.

=== 19th century ===
The present Glasshayes House was built sometime between 1806 and 1816 by George Buck (esquire), utilising material from the earlier buildings, as a countryside retreat for him and his wife (who died at the house in 1826, and supposedly still haunts it).

In the 1840s Glasshayes "consisted of a house, offices, garden and pleasure ground on six acres and four acres of adjoining fields, three of which was pasture"; in 1846 it had become the English seat of Richard Fitzgeorge de Stacpoole, 1st Duc de Stacpoole, who made considerable extensions to the house (though retained the "Gothick" aesthetic and octagonal tower of George Buck). From the house the Duc ran a local smuggling ring, and lived openly with his married mistress, Mrs Louisa Graves. He died there on the 7 July 1848, and according to local tradition his ghost can still be sighted.

On the Duc's death the house was inherited by Louisa Graves, who later sold the house to a Mr and Mrs Fussell (who do not appear to have taken residence). The land was later purchased by a local grocer and draper, William Beale Bugden, who farmed the land but did not take residence at the house. During this period of dereliction the house was in regular use by smugglers.

In 1862 Charles Castleman moved to Glasshayes with his third wife Isabel Swinburne, and whilst in residence gifted the clock to the clocktower of the newly built local St. Michael and All Angels church, in exchange for the closing of an insalubrious public road which ran directly behind the house.

In 1874 the house became the seat of Colonel Alexander Caldcleugh Macleay, a local magistrate and commander of the Seaforth Highlanders, and was the childhood home of Sir James William Ronald Macleay and his sister Lina MacLeay (who would later marry Sir Robert Arbuthnot). Glasshayes was used as the original headquarters of the Lyndhurst Golf Club, established in 1889, and in 1893 a bazaar was held at the mansion to raise £1000 for a new roof at the local church.

=== 20th century ===
==== Grand Hotel ====
In 1895 Glasshayes House was sold as the prospective "Grand Hotel," and by the 20th century this new venture had begun operation. Around 1905 the house had another floor added, and it is during this building work that sightings of the "Ghosts of Glasshayes" are first reported. Officers from local regiments used the hotel during both world wars, and numerous celebrity guests during later decades included Margaret Thatcher and the Beatles.

==== Sir Arthur Conan Doyle ====
Sir Arthur Conan Doyle had, by the early 20th century, become a regular visitor to "the Grand." It was during a stay at the hotel in March 1912 that he sketched out designs for a third storey extension and altered front facade to the building. Work on the extension began in Autumn of that year, and the building as it survives today is a near perfect expression of Doyle's plans.

==== Lyndhurst Park Hotel ====
In 1970 the house was bought as an ongoing concern by Forestdale Hotels Ltd and renamed as the Lyndhurst Park Hotel, receiving multiple unsympathetic extensions throughout the 1970s and 1980s which developed it into a 60-bed hotel. In 2014 the hotel was purchased by the St James Hotel group, and later that year it was closed and bought by developers PegasusLife, who plan to demolish the property in order to build retirement flats on the land, despite local opposition. Prior to closure it employed 13 full-time staff and 8 casual workers.

== Folklore ==
=== The Ghosts of Glasshayes ===
According to local tradition, the building is haunted by a number of ghosts, known as the "Ghosts of Glasshayes." The most sighted is that of Richard Fitzgeorge de Stacpoole, the first Duc de Stacpoole. Sightings have been reported by builders working on extensions to the site, both at the beginning of the 20th century and in the 1970s, apparently berating and sometimes attacking them for disturbing his property. Supposedly, every year on the night of his death (July 7) strange music can be heard in certain rooms, and folklore has it that this is from a grand ball that the Duc holds annually for the dead. During the 1912 extensions, workers on the site added the seven "Glasshayes Devil Squares" over the entrance, each one signifying a separate ghost sighting during construction. Other ghost sightings have included that of Mrs Buck, for whom Glasshayes was built (and who died there in 1826) and of a chamber maid, who (according to legend) hanged herself after an affair with a cook. The reputation for hauntings is thought to what first attracted Sir Arthur Conan Doyle, a committed Spiritualist who held seances in the hotel.

=== Smuggling ===
From its earliest incarnation Glasshayes has been notable for its eccentric "octagonal tower," built as an original feature by George Buck to serve as a lookout for local smuggling operations (common within the New Forest area). When the Duc de Stacpoole purchased the property he continued to run the area smuggling ring from the house, also using his yacht "the Gipsey Queen" to transport illicit goods. A raid was carried out by excise agents in 1847, during which the Duc barricaded himself into the octagonal tower with a military saber, and the siege was widely reported in national papers of the time. The house continued to be used for smuggling activities during its years of non-residence after the Duc's death, but seems to have ceased the association from Charles Castleman's tenure beginning 1862. Local tradition reports numerous smuggling caches and hollows throughout the original portion of the property (particularly in the floor and behind the wooden paneling of the surviving octagonal room). There are even stories of a sealed up network of old tunnels connecting the house with nearby pubs, for the easy transport of illegal liquor.

== Development and demolition ==
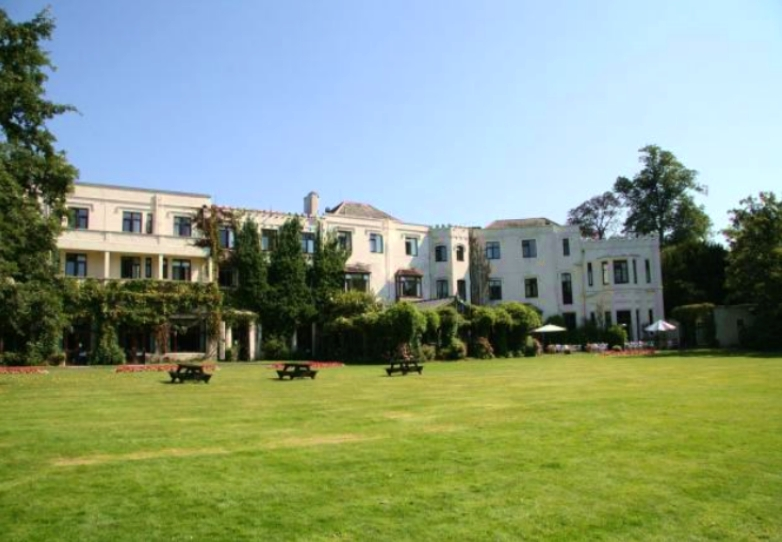
The Lyndhurst Park Hotel in 2014

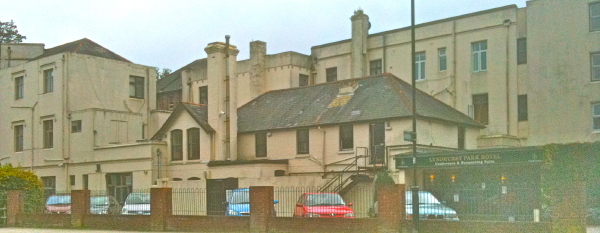
The rear of Glasshayes from Lyndhurst High Street

In 2014 the hotel and estate was closed and bought by developers PegasusLife, who plan to demolish the house in order to build retirement flats on the land, despite local opposition.

The proposed demolition has been refused twice, the first in February 2017 and the latest being in December 2017.

In view of the recently discovered connection with novelist Sir Arthur Conan Doyle, who designed the garden facade, a new application was made in 2017 to list the hotel.

== Notable residents ==
- Arthur Phillip
- Richard Fitzgeorge de Stacpoole, 1st Duc de Stacpoole
- Charles Castleman
