= Brusher Mills =

English snake-catcher

Harry "Brusher" Mills
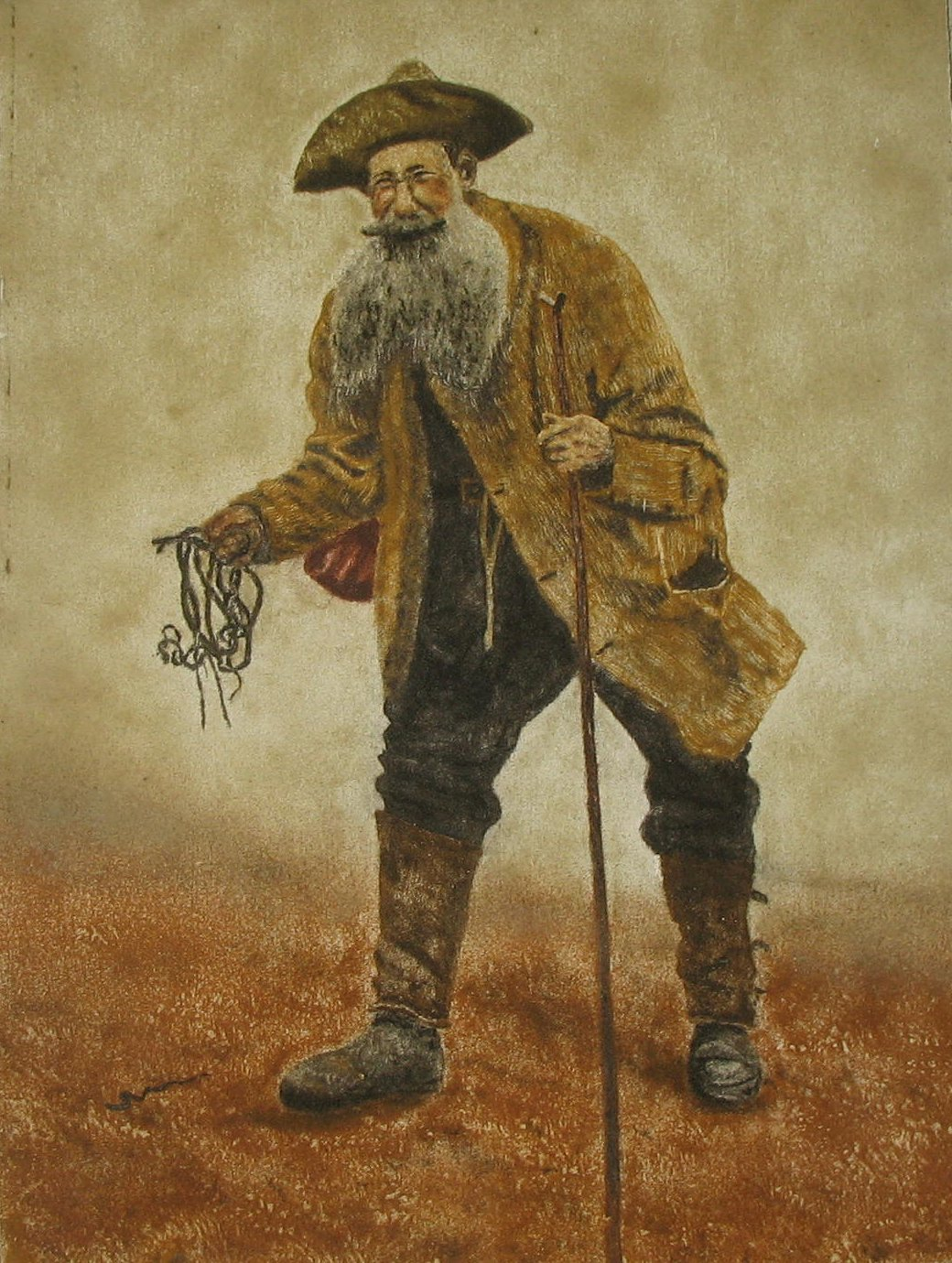
- Modern sandpainting of Brusher Mills by Brian Pike
- Born: Henry Mills; 19 March 1840; Emery Down, Hampshire, England
- Died: 1 July 1905 (aged 65); Brockenhurst, Hampshire, England
- Resting place: St Nicholas' Church, Brockenhurst
- Occupation: Snake catcher

Harry "Brusher" Mills (born Henry Mills, 19 March 1840 – 1 July 1905) was a hermit and snake catcher, resident in the New Forest in Hampshire, England. His way of life made him a local celebrity and an attraction for visitors to the New Forest.

== Early life ==
Henry Mills was born on 19 March 1840 to Thomas Mills (1800–1871), an agricultural labourer, and Ann Stote (1802–1878). He grew up in the village of Emery Down near Lyndhurst. Around 1880, he took up residence in an old charcoal burner's hut in the woodlands near Sporelake Lawn, about 1 mile (1.6 km) north of Brockenhurst.

== Occupation ==
In his forties, Mills took up snake-catching for a living, ridding local properties of snakes, armed with little more than a sack and a forked stick. He is said to have manufactured and sold ointments from parts of the snakes, and other snakes he boiled so that he might sell their skeletons to curious tourists. He supplied Grass Snakes and occasionally Adders to London Zoo as food for their birds of prey, and snake-eating snakes. It is estimated that he caught around 30,000 snakes in his lifetime.

Following a national press article about him, Mills became a draw for tourists and visitors to the New Forest, who would have their photographs taken with him, buy his snake potions, and listen to his country lore. He regularly attended cricket matches at nearby Balmer Lawn and was paid to sweep the pitch between innings, earning him the nickname "Brusher".

== Later years and death ==
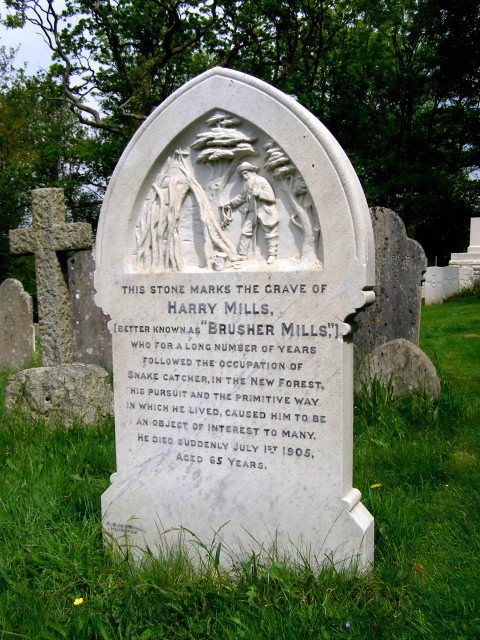
Brusher Mills' gravestone, St Nicholas' Churchyard, Brockenhurst

After nearly thirty years of living in this manner, Mills decided to build himself a larger hut. When it was nearly completed, it was vandalised, leaving him homeless. The perpetrators were never caught, however it is thought that it was destroyed to prevent him claiming squatters' rights, as forest law would allow him to claim ownership of the land on which he had lived for many years.

He took up residence in an outbuilding of The Railway Inn, Brockenhurst, where he was a regular patron. He died there a short time later.

== Legacy ==
Mills is buried in St Nicholas' Churchyard, Brockenhurst. A marble headstone, paid for by locals, was erected over his grave shortly after his death. It includes a carved tableau of him at work, in his distinctive wide-brimmed hat.

After his death, George Wateridge took on the role of snake catcher, inheriting the stack and forked stick from Mills.

The Railway Inn, where Mills was a regular and had spent his final years, was renamed The Snakecatcher.
