= Bank, Hampshire =

Village in Hampshire, England

Coordinates: 50.8618°N 1.5952°W

Bank
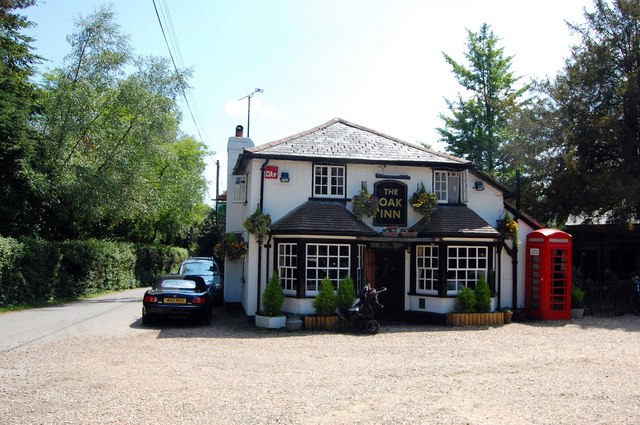
- The Oak Inn, Bank

- Location within Hampshire
- OS grid reference: SU286071
- District: New Forest
- Shire county: Hampshire
- Region: South East
- Country: England
- Sovereign state: United Kingdom
- Post town: LYNDHURST
- Postcode district: SO43
- Dialling code: 023
- Police: Hampshire and Isle of Wight
- Fire: Hampshire and Isle of Wight
- Ambulance: South Central
- UK Parliament: New Forest East

Bank is a village in the English county of Hampshire. The settlement is within the civil parish of Lyndhurst in the New Forest, and is located approximately 8 miles (13 km) from both Ringwood and Southampton. It has one inn and approximately 30 distinct dwellings.

== Overview ==
Bank is southwest of Lyndhurst and south of the main A35 road through the New Forest. It is bounded by woodland or wood pasture except on the east where there are arable lands, and former parkland of the Cuffnells Estate. The hamlet is an eclectic mix of former workers cottages together with higher status buildings constructed by 19th-century cultured owners seeking country retreats. The hamlet has no community facilities, other than the Oak Inn.

== History ==
The village of Bank seems to begin in the 16th century, as a settlement encroaching on the Forest. The original name was apparently "Annis' Bank". The oldest surviving building is Japonica Cottage, which dates from the 16th century. Old Cottage dates from the 17th century, although it is nowadays dominated by a 20th-century wing. To the east of Bank were the large 18th-century estates of Cuffnells and Wilverley, and the inhabitants of Bank may have been involved in servicing these two large estates and their associated farms. The Oak Inn is a two-storey late 18th century building of painted brick, which may have been a cider house in the 18th century.

Nearby is a small cluster of cottages which go by the name of Gritnam. It is likely that Gritnam is the place recorded in the Domesday Book of 1086 under the name "Greteha". It was one of the 51 manors held by Waleran the Hunter as recorded in the Domesday Book of 1086. Prior to 1066, Bolla had possessed it from King Edward. Gritnam is also mentioned in 1300 as "Grettenhamdune" (i.e. Gritnam down). The name might mean "the gravelly place," or "the great homestead." The famous New Forest "snakecatcher" Brusher Mills was reported living in an old charcoal burner's hut by the boundary of nearby Gritnam Wood in around 1895.

The Liberal MP, Robert John Price, was a resident of Bank, as was the Liberal M.P. John Fletcher Moulton, who, when he entered the House of Lords in 1912, took the title "Baron Moulton of Bank".

Several literary figures have stayed in Bank. Mary Elizabeth Braddon, author of the sensation novel, Lady Audley's Secret, built Annesley House, with her husband, in the 1880s. They used it as a country home, whilst retaining a main residence in Richmond, Surrey. Her son, the novelist W. B. Maxwell, also stayed here as a young man. The house was later used as a Barnardo's children's home.

In Christmas and New Year, 1904–05, Virginia Woolf stayed at Lane End House in Bank with her sister and two brothers. Later, Rupert Brooke stayed at a cottage called "Beech Shade" in Gritnam. He would later write to his friend, Bryn Olivier, about his recovery from depression in Bank:

Then there was Bank, Bryn. For three whole months I'd been infinitely wretched & ill, wretcheder than I'd thought possible. And then for a few days it all dropped completely away, and — oh! how lovely Bank was! — I suppose I should never be able to make you see what beauty is to me, — physical beauty — , just even the seeing it in spite of all the hungers that come.
