= Balmer Lawn =

Coordinates: 50.82°N 01.57°W

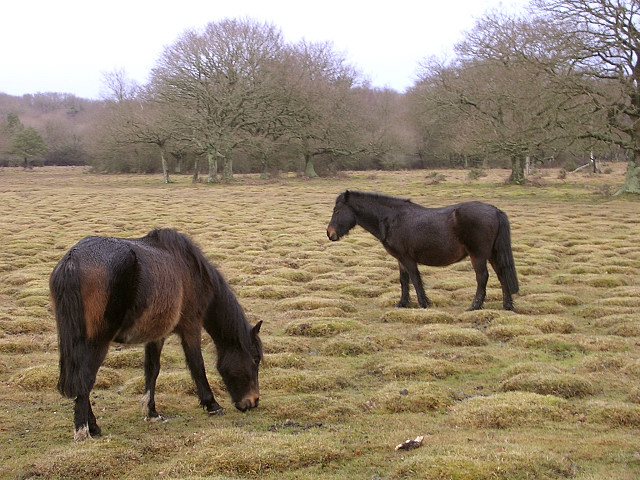
- Ponies grazing on Balmer Lawn in February

- Location within Hampshire
- OS grid reference: SU3003
- Shire county: Hampshire
- Region: South East
- Country: England
- Sovereign state: United Kingdom
- Police: Hampshire and Isle of Wight
- Fire: Hampshire and Isle of Wight
- Ambulance: South Central

Balmer Lawn is the name of a large New Forest Lawn located in an amphitheatre of woodland in the New Forest National Park in Hampshire, England. It is just north of the village of Brockenhurst. The lawn comprises about 500 acre of open low land grazing frequented by Forest stock. The name of the area comes from a distortion of the historical name Palmers Water - reference “Comyn’s New Forest” of 1817. Palmers Water was in fact a small settlement which has long since disappeared but was located to east of the ford on the Brockenhurst to Beaulieu road. The water being the Lymington River which separates Brockenhurst and the small settlement of Balmerlawn on the south side of the grazing lawn. The lawn of course remained and over time Palmers became Balmer, perhaps aided by the local dialect.

The river crossing (now Brockenhurst Bridge) on the south west corner of the lawn area is thought to have been recorded as a ford in Roman Times and also mentioned in the Domesday Book. Along with St Nicolas Church a mile further south on the hill overlooking the area.

== Landmarks ==
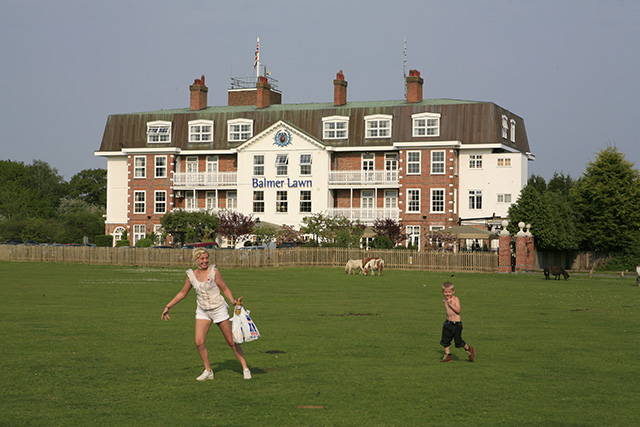
Balmer Lawn Hotel

The most significant man made landmark is the Balmer Lawn Hotel built originally as a private house/hunting lodge around in the early 19th century (it is not recorded in Comyn’s maps of 1817) and transformed into the current building around in the later part of that century. It was known as ‘The Holt’ around that time. A major fire in the early 1970s changed the aspect of the hotel causing the original roof to be replaced with one in the mansard style. The hotel has recently been subject of modern “re-branding” assuming the name of the lawn itself. Tradition however lives on as in front of the hotel is the informal village cricket pitch, home of Brockenhurst Cricket Club, which has been in use since around 1797.

The hotel has hosted many famous guests throughout history including King George V, Russian Royalty, J.J. Sainsbury, Winston Churchill and U.S. General Dwight D. Eisenhower. More recently, the Top Gear team filmed at the hotel, and countless Autumn Watch episodes are filmed around the hotel with the TV personalities staying at the hotel.

During the First World War the hotel was commandeered as a field hospital. Some people still remember injured soldiers being wheeled on luggage trolleys from Brockenhurst railway station to the hotel.

In the Second World War the hotel was transformed into an Army Staff College. Some of the "Orders for the Day" were issued from the hotel for the D-Day invasion. During the extensive refurbishment of the hotel, spent ammunition was found under the floorboards.

The early years of the hotel's history were spent in private ownership. After the Second World War it was part of Myddleton Hotels and was a sister hotel to the Royal Bath Hotel in Bournemouth. In 1973 the hotel was acquired by the Ladbroke Group and latterly became an Associate Hilton Hotel. In October 1997 the hotel once again returned to private ownership. The Wilson family are now the owners of the hotel and are continuously refurbishing the property.
