= Lyndhurst, Hampshire =

Village and parish in Hampshire, England

Coordinates: 50.87°N 1.58°W

Lyndhurst
- Village, civil parish
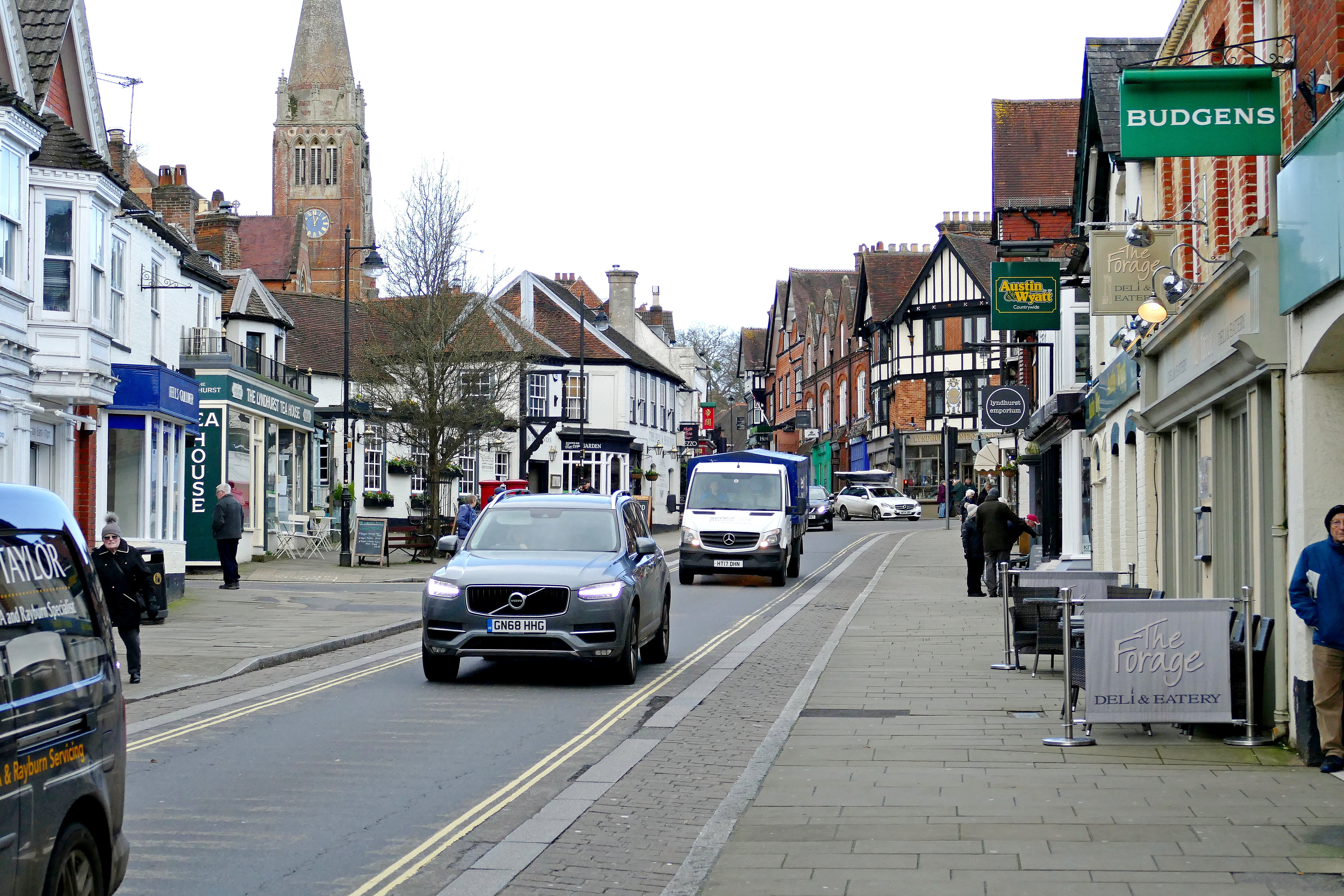
- Lyndhurst High Street, February 2020

- Location within Hampshire
- Population: 3,019 (2021 census)
- District: New Forest
- Shire county: Hampshire
- Region: South East
- Country: England
- Sovereign state: United Kingdom
- Post town: Lyndhurst
- Postcode district: SO40, SO43
- Dialling code: 023
- Police: Hampshire and Isle of Wight
- Fire: Hampshire and Isle of Wight
- Ambulance: South Central
- UK Parliament: New Forest East

Lyndhurst /lɪndhərst/ is a village and civil parish situated in the New Forest in Hampshire, England, about nine miles (14 km) south-west of Southampton. Known as the "capital of the New Forest", Lyndhurst houses the New Forest District Council and Court of Verderers. It is also a popular tourist attraction, with many independent shops, art galleries, cafés, museums, pubs and hotels. At the 2021 census, Lyndhurst had a population of 3,019.

Lyndhurst was first mentioned in the Domesday Book under the Old English name 'Linhest', meaning 'wooded hill with lime-trees'. The church of St. Michael and All Angels was built in the 1860s, and contains a fresco by Lord Leighton and stained-glass windows by Charles Kempe, William Morris, Edward Burne-Jones and others; Alice Liddell, the inspiration for Alice in Lewis Carroll's Alice's Adventures in Wonderland, is buried there. Glasshayes House (the former Lyndhurst Park Hotel) is the only surviving example of Sir Arthur Conan Doyle's architectural experimentation, and local folklore records Lyndhurst as the site of a dragon slaying, and as being haunted by the ghost of Richard Fitzgeorge de Stacpoole, 1st Duc de Stacpoole.

== History ==
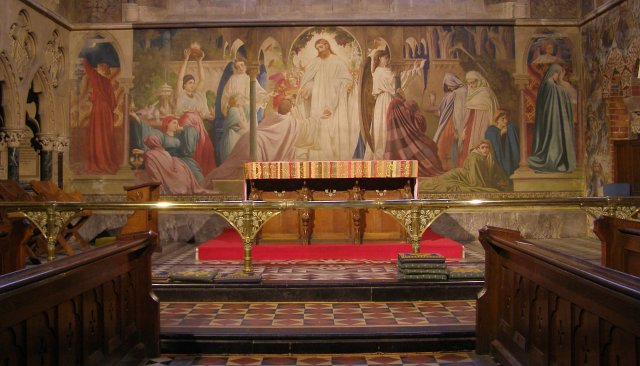
The Leighton Fresco, St Michael and All Angels church

Lyndhurst is an Old English name, meaning 'wooded hill with lime-trees growing'. The name comprises the words lind ('lime-tree') and hyrst ('wooded hill'). The first mention of Lyndhurst was in the Domesday Book of 1086 under the name 'Linhest'. It was part of the royal lands of the New Forest, with the exception of 1 virgate which was held by Herbert the Forester. Herbert may have been the ancestor of the Lyndhurst family, beginning with Herbert Lyndhurst, who held the bailiwick and manor of Lyndhurst in the 12th and 13th centuries.

The manor passed to Henry III in 1270, and together with the wardenship of the New Forest, which invariably accompanied the manor, it formed part of the dowry of four consecutive queens: Eleanor of Castile, Margaret of France, Isabella of France, and Philippa of Hainault. The manor was back in the hands of the king before 1362, and it was granted to various noble families over the course of the following century. Between 1467 and 1581 it was in the hands of the Earls of Arundel, after which it once again reverted to the Crown.

The estate was once again passed to various noble families until 1667, when Charles II granted it to Charles Paulet, 1st Duke of Bolton. He was followed successively by his son and grandson, but by the mid 18th century it was back in royal hands, being held successively by Prince William Henry (up to 1805) and Prince Frederick (until 1827). Subsequently, the manor was deemed "not important to be kept", and the copyholds of the manor, which included estates in Minstead, Burley, Bartley and Poulner, either became enfranchised or passed to the Crown.

A royal park was attached to the manor of Lyndhurst from a very early date. It was unusual for being a King's Park within a King's Forest. In 1299 it covered an area of 500 acres (202 ha), the profits from the honey gathered there amounting to 2 shillings per annum. It was actively worked during the 14th and 15th centuries when payments were made for the fencing and repairing of the palings. The "old Park" of Lyndhurst is where the Lime Wood (formerly Parkhill) Hotel now stands, the new park being on the A337 Brockenhurst road.

== Geography ==
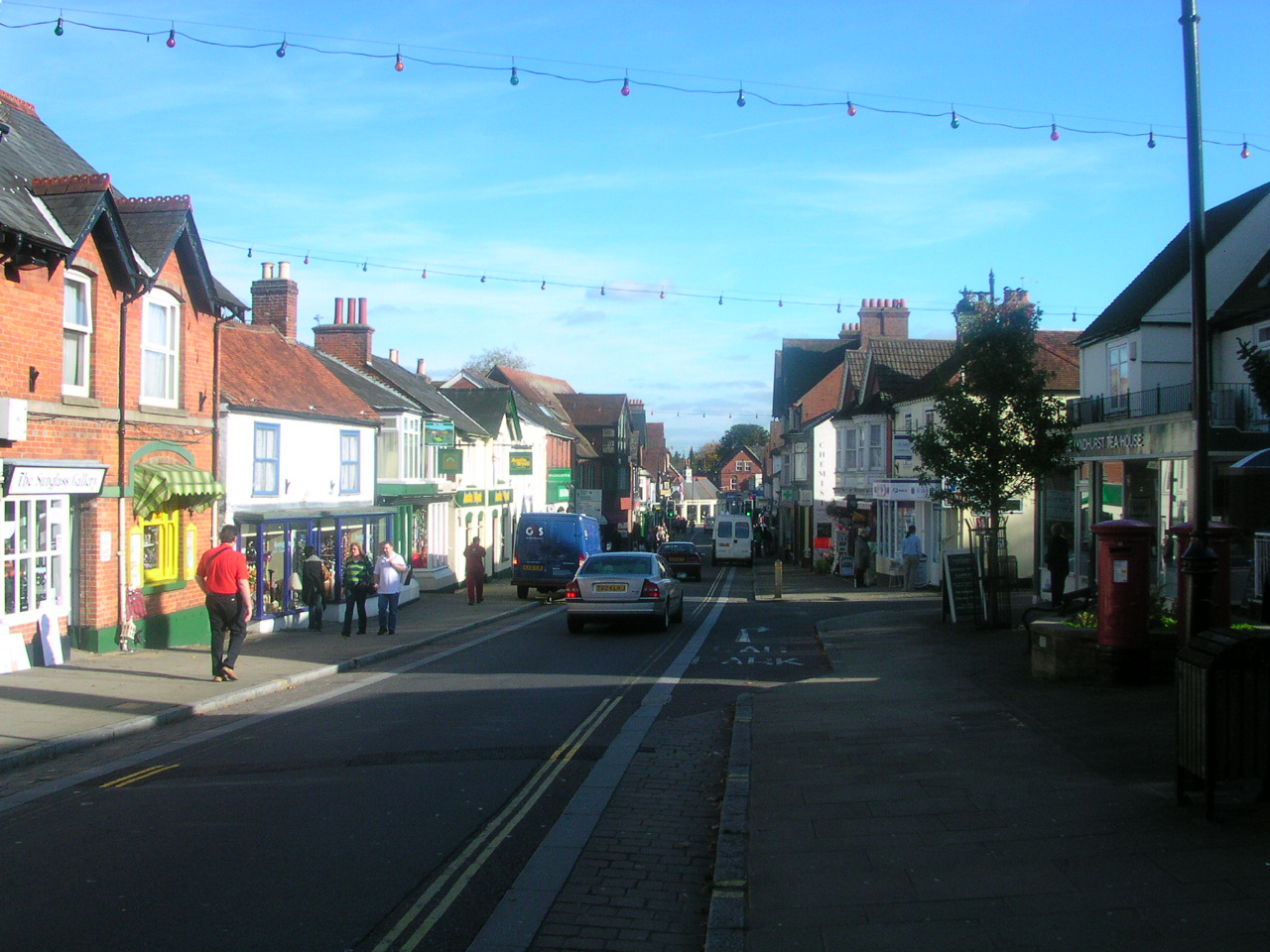
Lyndhurst High Street

Lyndhurst is in the New Forest, a national park in Hampshire, England. The village is the administrative capital of the New Forest, with the district council based in the village. The Court of Verderers sits in the King's House in Lyndhurst. The local headquarters of the Forestry Commission, the body that handles the maintenance of the softwood plantations, forest roads and paths, and controlling the spread of invasive plants, such as rhododendrons and gorse is also based in the King's House.

Also situated towards the outskirts of the village is Foxlease, formerly one of the training and activity centres of Girlguiding UK and now run by a local charitable group. The site has been the scene of several internationally important Girl Guiding and Girl Scouting events. It was established in February 1922 following the marriage of president Mary, Princess Royal and Countess of Harewood. The headquarters of the privately owned British chemicals company Ineos is located in the village.

The civil parish includes the hamlets of Bank and Emery Down. Lyndhurst is surrounded by varied "forest", from the heathland of Parkhill to the bog of Matley, and the open forest with its ancient oak and beech to the enclosures of softwoods.

== Demographics ==
At the 2021 census, Lyndhurst civil parish had a population of 3,019 people in 1,373 households.

Census population of Lyndhurst parish
Census	Population	Female	Male	Households	Source
2001	2,973	1,572	1,401	1,365	
2011	3,029	1,568	1,461	1,374	
2021	3,019	1,579	1,440	1,373	

== Landmarks ==
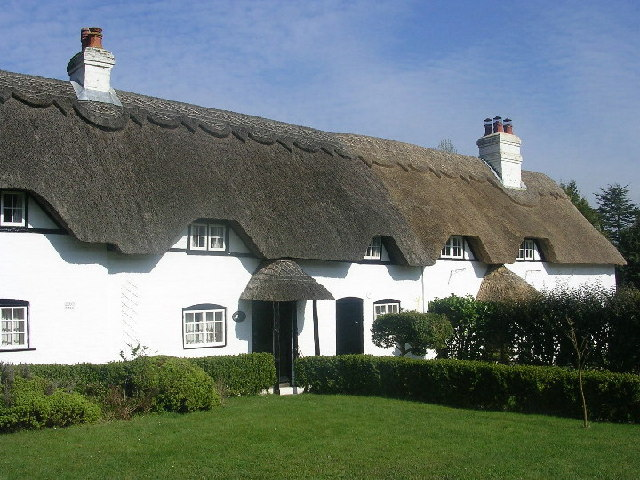
Thatched cottages at Swan Green

The church of St. Michael and All Angels is a major landmark, built of many different colours of brick, on one of the highest points in the village. Glasshayes House (also known as the Lyndhurst Park Hotel) is a Georgian "Gothick" villa, and after its 1912 alterations was the only surviving example of Sir Arthur Conan Doyle's forays into architecture. In local tradition it was haunted by the ghost of Richard Fitzgeorge de Stacpoole, 1st Duc de Stacpoole. It has recently been demolished and replaced by a housing development designed to reflect the architecture of the hotel and existing high street. The site sits adjacent to Bolton's Bench, a picturesque hill to the east of the village which, according to local folklore, was originally the corpse of a dragon; Other local landmarks include a row of much photographed thatched cottages on the road to the neighbouring hamlet of Emery Down, and the New Forest Centre, which includes the New Forest Museum and New Forest Gallery.

=== The King's House ===
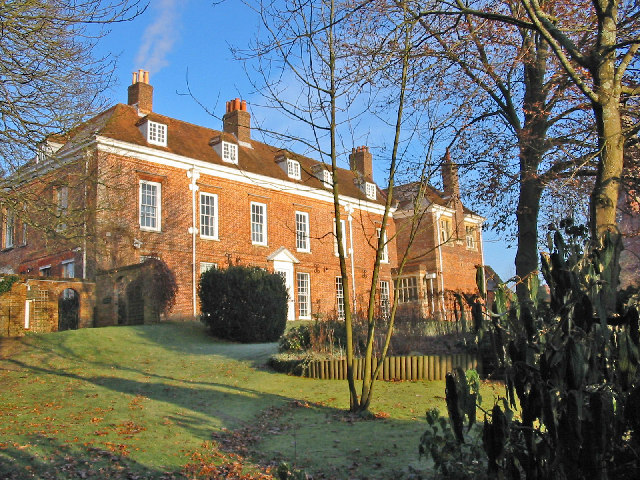
The King's House

The most important building in Lyndhurst is the King's House, which has also in the past been called the Queen's House, for the name changes according to the gender of the monarch. It is the principal building owned by the Crown in the New Forest, and contains the Verderers' Hall, home of the ancient Verderers' Court. The King's House is also the local headquarters of the Forestry Commission.

A manor house probably existed in Lyndhurst by the 13th century. In the reign of Edward I an order was given for "twenty oaks to make laths for the use of the queen's manor-house at Lyndhurst." This house was probably superseded by the hunting lodge built at Lyndhurst in the 14th century, which received frequent royal visits, and for which there are many records relating to the repair and enlargement. In 1388 a hall was built within the lodge, known later as the Verderers' Hall.

Rebuilding took place in the reign of Henry VIII, and especially in the 17th century, during the reigns of Charles I and Charles II, and the current structure largely dates from this time. The last monarch to stay here was George III who visited the New Forest in June 1789. Frances Burney, who was Second Keeper of the Robes to Queen Charlotte, described the house as "a straggling, inconvenient, old house, but delightfully situated, in a village—looking indeed at present like a populous town, from the amazing concourse of people that have crowded into it."

The building today is a rambling two-storey structure in brick. The prisoners' dock, tables and chairs of considerable age are preserved in the hall. Also to be found within is the so-called "Stirrup of Rufus", which was used to measure dogs.

== Religious sites ==
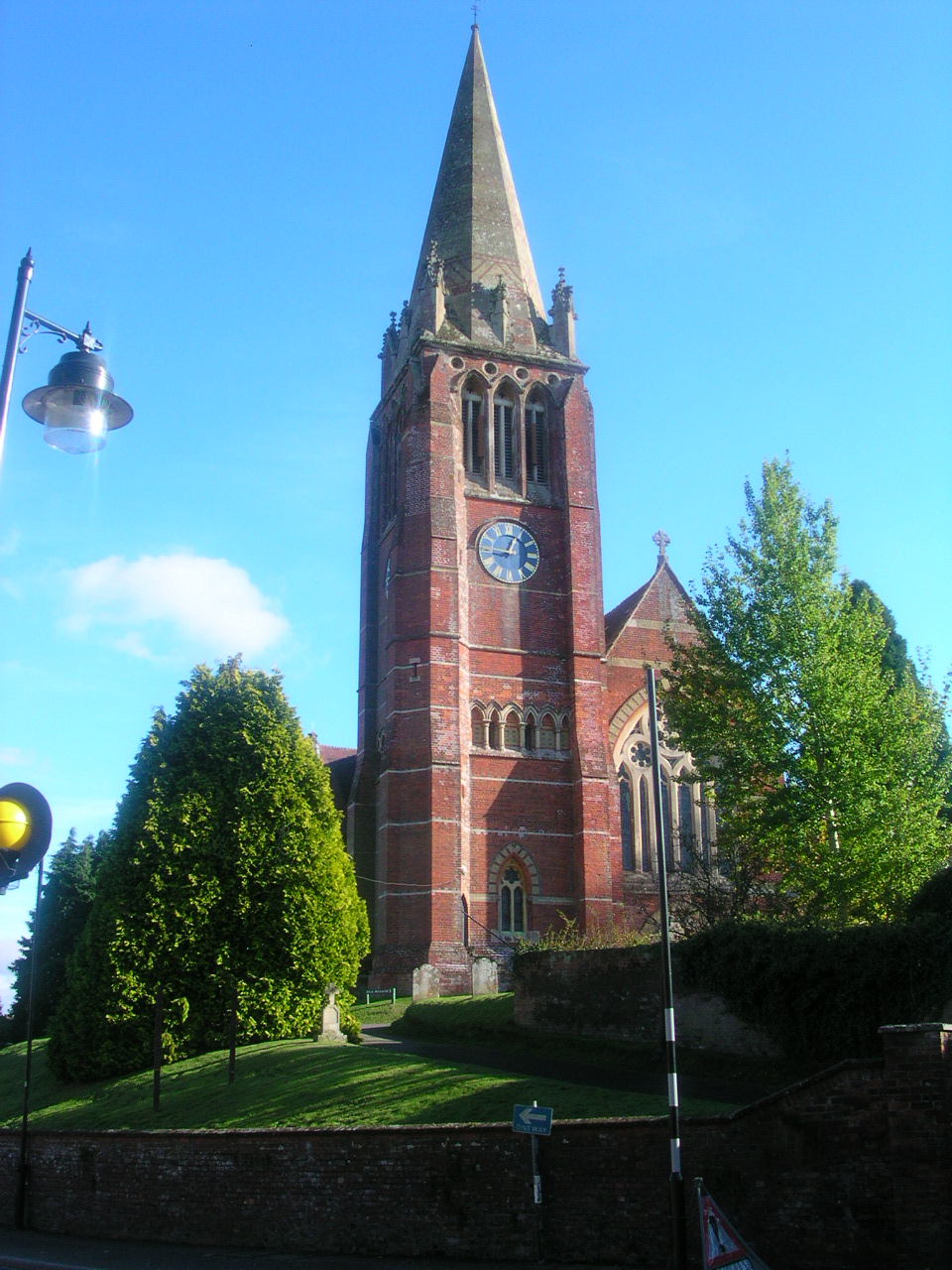
St Michael and All Angels Church

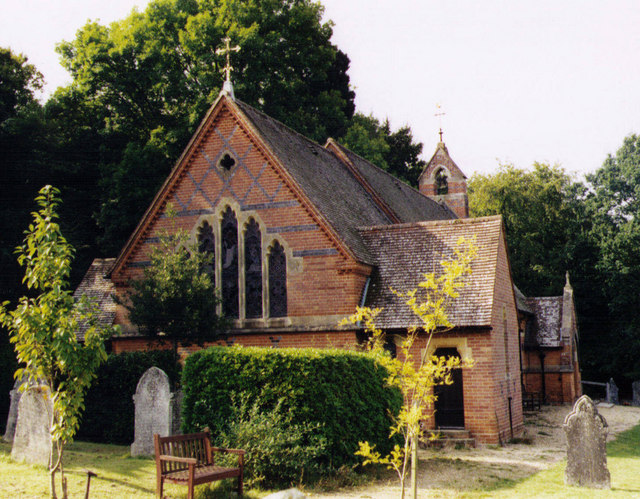
Christ Church, Emery Down

The village's Anglican church, St Michael and All Angels, is on a mound overlooking the village. It was built between 1858 and 1870, and is the third such building on the site. The church was designed by William White. It is constructed with red brick with yellow trim. It has a tall (160 ft,(48.8m)) brick-banded spire at the north-west end which can be seen from the Isle of Wight. The interior has yellow, white and red exposed brickwork, and a nave roof decorated with life-size supporting angels. The church contains a fresco by Frederick Leighton showing the Parable of the Wise and Foolish Virgins, with biblical characters said to be modelled on local people. The church also contains stained glass windows designed by William Morris, Edward Burne-Jones, and Charles Kempe.

There is also a very fine, small Catholic Church of the Assumption and St Edward the Confessor, built by Sir Arthur Blomfield between 1894 and 1896 as a memorial to Marie-Louise Souberbielle. The village also has a Baptist church.

Christ Church, Emery Down, is a grade II listed building erected in 1864.

== Education and culture ==
St Michael & All Angels CE Infant School was built in 1848 and is still the main village school. Lyndhurst Teddies Pre-School is located next to the Infant School. New Forest Small School is an independent school for children aged 3 to 16.

In 2020, Hampshire County Council announced plans to close Lyndhurst library. A small children's library is now run by Lyndhurst Community Centre.

== The Bisterne Dragon ==
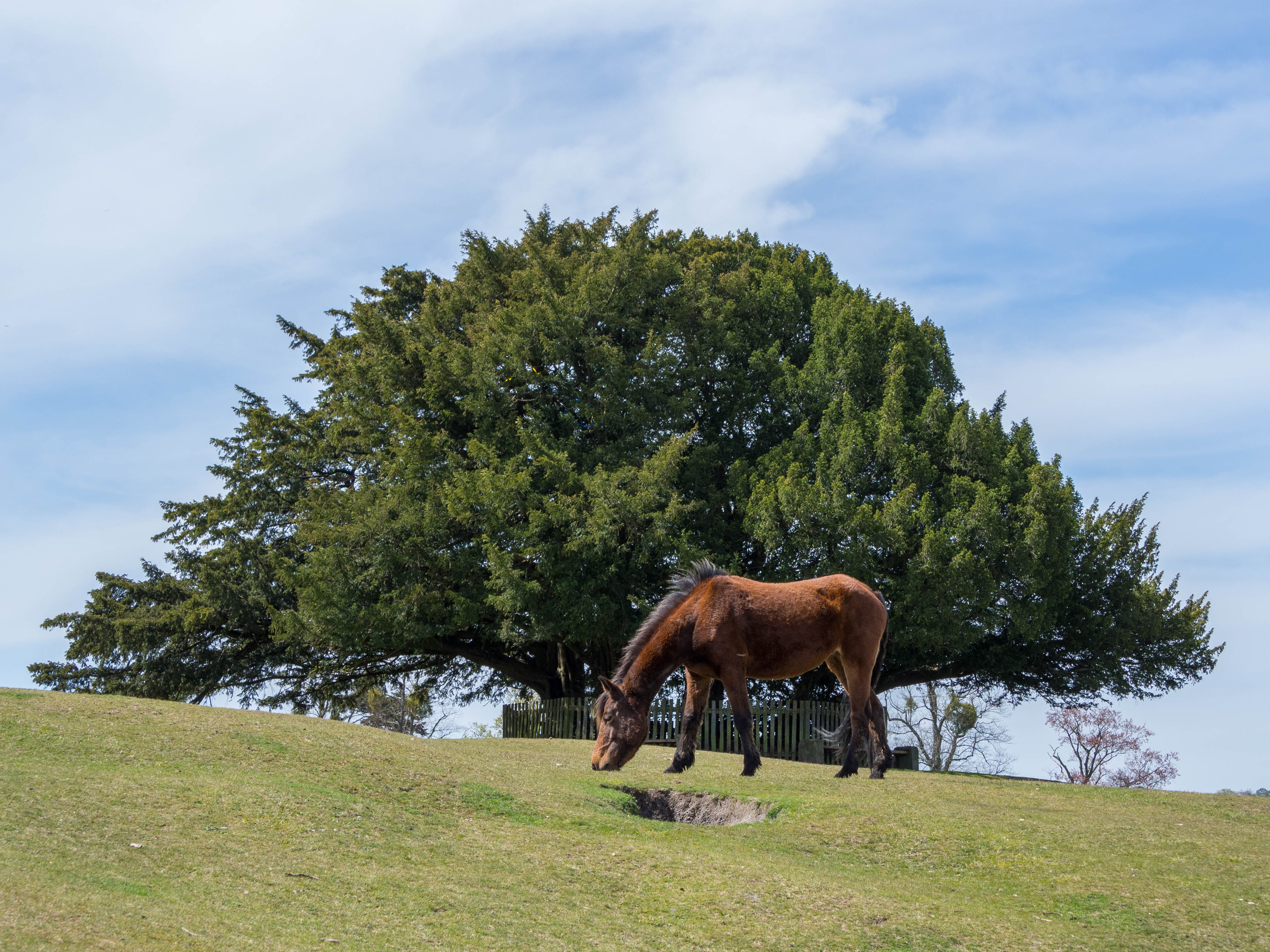
Bolton's Bench on the edge of the village

Lyndhurst is notable in English folklore for being the supposed location of a dragon-slaying. The local tradition is that a dragon had his den at Burley Beacon in Burley. There are several versions of the tale, one being that the creature "flew" every morning to Bisterne, where it would be supplied with milk. To kill the dragon, a valiant knight (usually named Berkeley) built a hide, and with two dogs lay in wait. The creature came as usual one morning for its milk, and when the hut door was opened the dogs attacked it, and while thus engaged the knight took the dragon by surprise, the dogs dying in the affray. The fight raged throughout the forest, with the dragon finally dying outside Lyndhurst, its corpse turning into a great hill (now known as Boltons Bench). Though the knight had defeated the dragon he had been mentally broken by the battle, and after thirty days and thirty nights he went back to Boltons Bench to die alone atop it, his body turning into the yew tree which can still be seen today.

== Transport ==
The village is the meeting point of the A35 road, which runs northeast to southwest between Southampton and Bournemouth, and the A337 which runs north to south between Cadnam on the M27 motorway, and Lymington, a ferry port for the Isle of Wight on the south coast. To deal with the large volume of traffic through the village, there is a one-way system. This in effect turns the major roads of the village into a roundabout.

It has long been mooted that the solution to Lyndhurst's traffic problem is to build a bypass through the surrounding National Park forest land. In 1947 the government's Baker Report accepted that a bypass might be necessary, and provision was made in the New Forest Act 1949 to construct roads through the forest with the consent of the Verderers. Public inquiries were held in 1975 and 1983. On both occasions the various routes proposed by the county council were opposed by the Verderers as being detrimental to the environment. The Verderers stated that they would not oppose a less harmful route.

The last serious attempt at a Lyndhurst Bypass Bill was rejected in July 1988. In 2006 Lyndhurst Parish Council again called for a bypass, and proposed that the road followed the route suggested in 1983 but with a 400-metre-long (1,300 ft) cut-and-cover tunnel.

Although Lyndhurst itself does not have a railway station, it is served by Ashurst New Forest railway station, three miles (5 km) away, which was for many years named Lyndhurst Road railway station. It is also only four miles (6 km) from Brockenhurst and under 4 miles from Beaulieu Road station – all these stations are on the South West Main Line to London and Weymouth, serving Bournemouth and Southampton. Bus services operated by Bluestar run frequently to Southampton and Lymington. There are also two daily National Express coach departures to London Victoria. The New Forest Tour, an open-top bus tour run in the summer, starts and finishes in Lyndhurst.

== Sport ==
Lyndhurst Football Club were founded in 1885 and are one the oldest in the county. They are based at Wellands Road and have teams playing in both the Hampshire Premier League and Southampton League. Over the years, the club have won numerous trophies – most notably in 2005 when they lifted the Southampton Senior Cup at St. Mary's Stadium.

Established in 1936, Lyndhurst & Ashurst Cricket Club play at Beaulieu Road and run numerous sides. The first team are long serving members of the Hampshire League.

== Notable residents ==
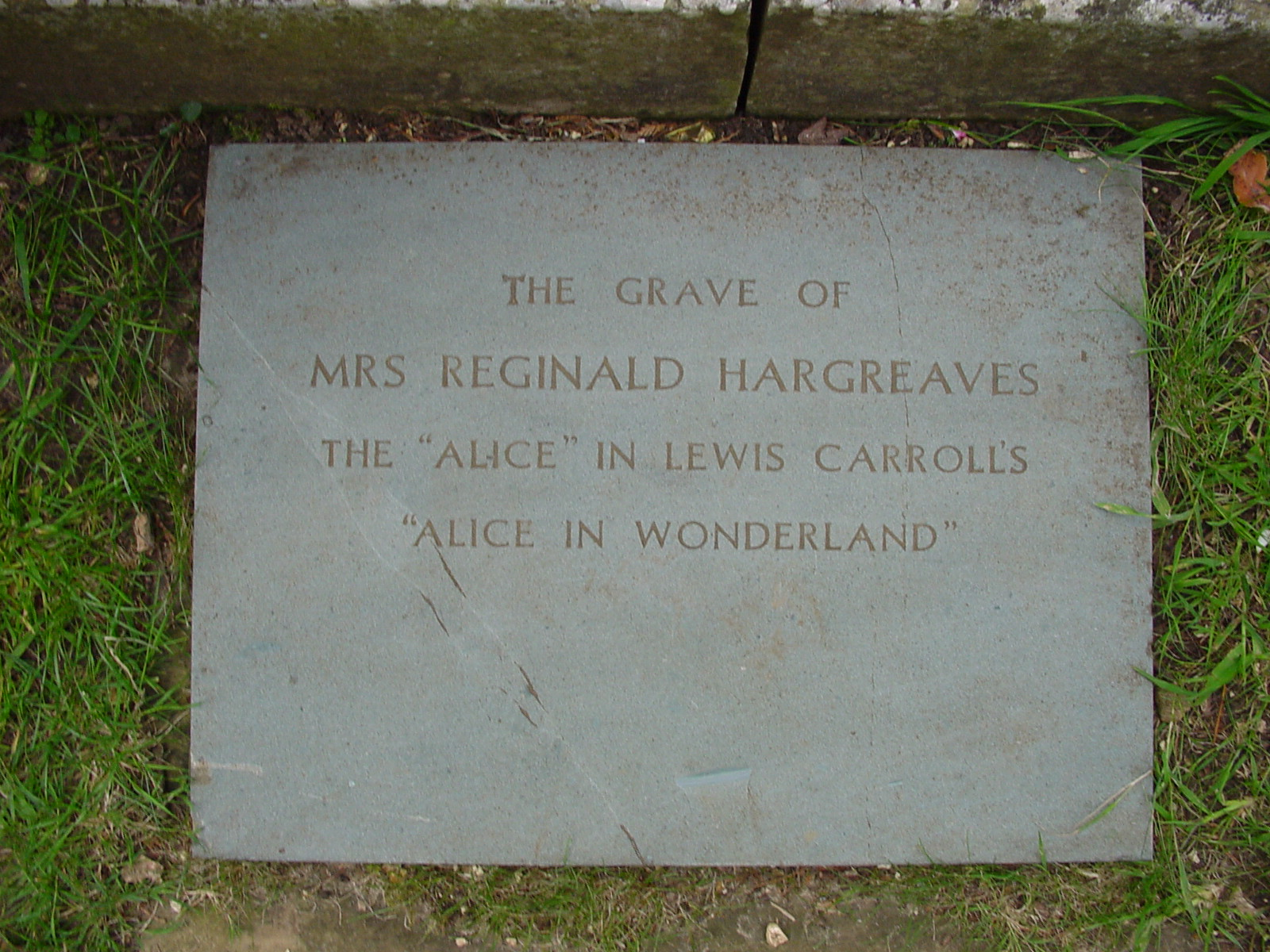
The grave of Alice Liddell in Lyndhurst

- Arthur Phillip
- Richard Fitzgeorge de Stacpoole, 1st Duc de Stacpoole
- Charles Castleman
- Sir James William Ronald Macleay
- Lina Arbuthnot (née Macleay)
- Brusher Mills
- Charles Hamilton Aide
- John Maxwell
- Mary Elizabeth Braddon
- Reginald Hargreaves
- Alice Liddell, also known as Alice Hargreaves, the inspiration for Alice in Lewis Carroll's Alice's Adventures in Wonderland, lived in and around Lyndhurst after her marriage to Reginald Hargreaves, and is buried in the graveyard.
- Keith Harris
- Nigel Eaton, hurdy-gurdy player

== Twin towns ==
Lyndhurst is twinned with La Chevrolière in France.

== See also ==
- Portuguese Fireplace
