= Emery Down =

Village in Hampshire, England

Coordinates: 50.8768°N 1.5974°W

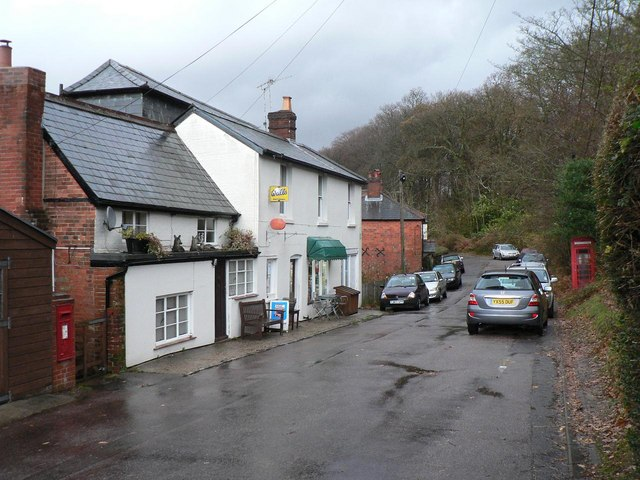
- Emery Down

- Location within Hampshire
- OS grid reference: SU284087
- Civil parish: Lyndhurst
- District: New Forest
- Shire county: Hampshire
- Region: South East
- Country: England
- Sovereign state: United Kingdom
- Post town: LYNDHURST
- Postcode district: SO43
- Dialling code: 023
- Police: Hampshire and Isle of Wight
- Fire: Hampshire and Isle of Wight
- Ambulance: South Central
- UK Parliament: New Forest West

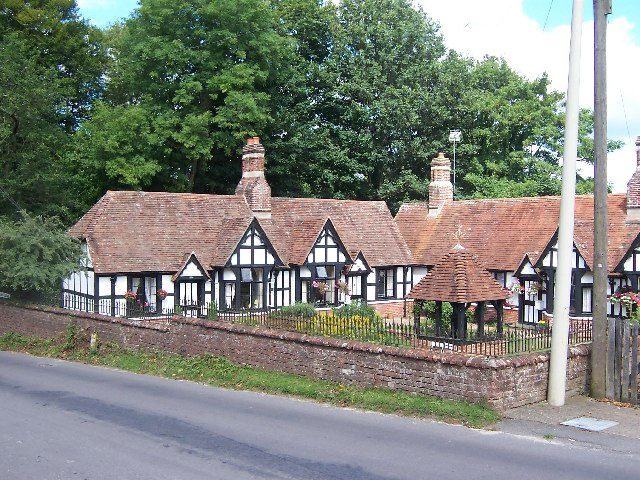
Boultbee Cottages, former almshouses

Emery Down is a small village in the New Forest National Park in Hampshire, England. Its nearest other village is Lyndhurst, which lies approximately 1.4 miles (2.3 km) south-east from the village.

== Overview ==
Emery Down is a small village clustered around a hilltop overlooking Swan Green and Lyndhurst. The village has one inn called The New Forest Inn. The red telephone box in the village no longer has a phone, but is used as an Information Centre for local and New Forest information, history, advice, as well as a book exchange and as a place to purchase fruit and vegetables. The telephone box has its own website.

== History ==
Emery Down is recorded as Emerichdon in 1376, and Emeryesdowne in 1490. The "Emmory" family is recorded here in 1389. The surname is of French origin.

The homes of charcoal burners and agricultural labourers were in Silver Street in Emery Down. Here was born, in 1840, the New Forest "snake catcher" Brusher Mills, who lived here until at least 1861.

A major benefactor of Emery Down was Admiral Frederick Moore Boultbee, who lived here between 1856 and his death in 1876. Boultbee paid for the village church, Christ Church, which was designed by William Butterfield, and built in 1864. Boultbee lived with his niece Charlotte in a thatched cottage known as The Cottage, which before the 19th century had been an inn, The Running Horse. After Charlotte's death in 1896, The Cottage became the vicarage, and is now a private home.

Boultbee was also the benefactor for the village school, opened in 1865 and extended in 1885. The school operated until 1950. Boultbee also paid for the five alms houses, known as Boultbee Cottages, opposite the school. Designed by William Butterfield, they were built in 1871 and occupied by elderly people of the parish.

The New Forest Inn, formerly the New Inn, dates back to at least the first half of the 19th century. The captain of the Titanic, Edward Smith, spent his final night on British shores at the pub before he set sail on the ship the next day.

Sir Arthur Conan Doyle stayed in Emery Down for a year from Easter 1889, while researching his novel The White Company and was frequently seen walking around the village.

Northerwood House is a Grade II listed Regency mansion, attributed to John Nash. The house was turned into flats in the 1970s.

Emery Down’s village hall was constructed in the 1920s by Burnett & Sons.
