= Charles Castleman (violinist) =

American violinist

Professor of Violin Charles Martin Castleman
- Born: 1941 (age 84–85); Quincy, MA
- Education: Harvard, Curtis, Penn
- Occupations: Violinist, professor of violin
- Years active: 1946–present
- Employer(s): Eastman, Frost(U Miami)
- Known for: Castleman Quartet Program(QCP)
- Awards: Medalist Queen Elisabeth Competition, Belgium Tchaikovsky Competition, Moscow

Charles Martin Castleman (born 22 May 1941) is an American violinist and teacher.

== Early life and education ==
Born in Quincy, Massachusetts, he began violin lessons at the age of four with Emanual Ondricek. When he was six he appeared as a soloist with Arthur Fiedler and the Boston Pops orchestra. At nine, he made his solo recital debuts at Jordan Hall in Boston and Town Hall in New York In Aaron Richmond's Celebrity Series of 1950-51 he was co-featured with Mischa Elman, Jascha Heifetz and Isaac Stern.

In 1968, he was a soloist with the Naumburg Orchestral Concerts, in the Naumburg Bandshell, Central Park, in the summer series.

== Career ==
After a forty-year career at Eastman School of Music, beginning as professor of violin in 1975, he became professor of violin at the Frost School of Music at the University of Miami in 2014.

== Notable performances, awards and recognition ==
In 2001 Cypres Records and the Queen Elisabeth Concours issued a retrospective CD set of the most outstanding performances in the history of the Concours; Castleman's rendition of Leon Jongen's concerto was chosen as one of the seventeen most distinguished violin performances.
