= Charles Castleman (solicitor) =

English lawyer & businessman

- Born: 1807; Allendale House, Wimborne, England
- Died: 17 July 1876 (aged 68–69); Bishopstoke, Eastleigh, England
- Occupations: Solicitor, Railway planner, Justice of the Peace, Prison inspector

Charles Castleman (1807–1876) was an English solicitor, railway planner, justice of the peace and prison inspector.

== Personal life ==
Born 1807 at Allendale House in Wimborne to William Castleman (founder of the Christchurch, Wimborne and Ringwood Bank), Charles was one of ten children, only three of whom survived into adulthood (Charles, Henry and Edward - all becoming solicitors). He first married Martha, who died of a fever at the age of 41 in 1848, and then married Louisa Hussey in 1852, who died of tuberculosis in 1854. He married Isabel Swinburne in 1859, and in 1862 they moved to the Glasshayes estate in Lyndhurst, New Forest. Whilst in residence at Lyndhurst he gifted the clock to the clocktower of the newly built local church of St Michael and All Angels. He and Isabel later moved to Surrey, and then on to Bishopstoke in Eastleigh where he suffered kidney failure, dying on 17 July 1876.

== Railway career ==
In 1844 Castleman conceived of the Southampton and Dorchester Railway, and approached the London and South Western Railway company (LSWR) with the idea. Fully operational by June 1847, the route was a success and (due to its circuitous pattern) is widely known as Castleman's Corkscrew, and remembered today in the Castleman Trailway. He was appointed director of the LSWR in 1855, then deputy chairman in 1859, and finally chairman in 1872.
