= List of locations in the New Forest =

This is a list of locations in the New Forest, England.

- Ashurst
- Bank
- Bartley
- Beaulieu
- Beaulieu Heath
- Beaulieu Road railway station
- Black Gutter Bottom
- Blackwater Arboretum
- Bolderwood
- Bramshaw
- Brockenhurst
- Brook
- Buckler's Hard
- Burley
- Cadnam
- Denny Wood
- East Boldre
- Eling
- Exbury
- Exbury Gardens
- Eyeworth Pond
- Fordingbridge
- Fritham
- Godshill
- Hamptworth
- Hyde
- Hale
- Holbury
- Hythe, Hampshire
- Lover
- Lyndhurst
- Marchwood
- Matley Bog
- Minstead
- Milford on Sea
- Needs Ore Point
- New Milton
- Nomansland
- North Gorley
- Ocknell Plain
- Pitts Wood
- Redlynch
- Rufus Stone
- Rhinefield
- Sowley Pond
- Sway
- Woodlands
