= Latchmore Brook =

Stream in the New Forest, England

Coordinates: 50.8950°N 1.7883°W

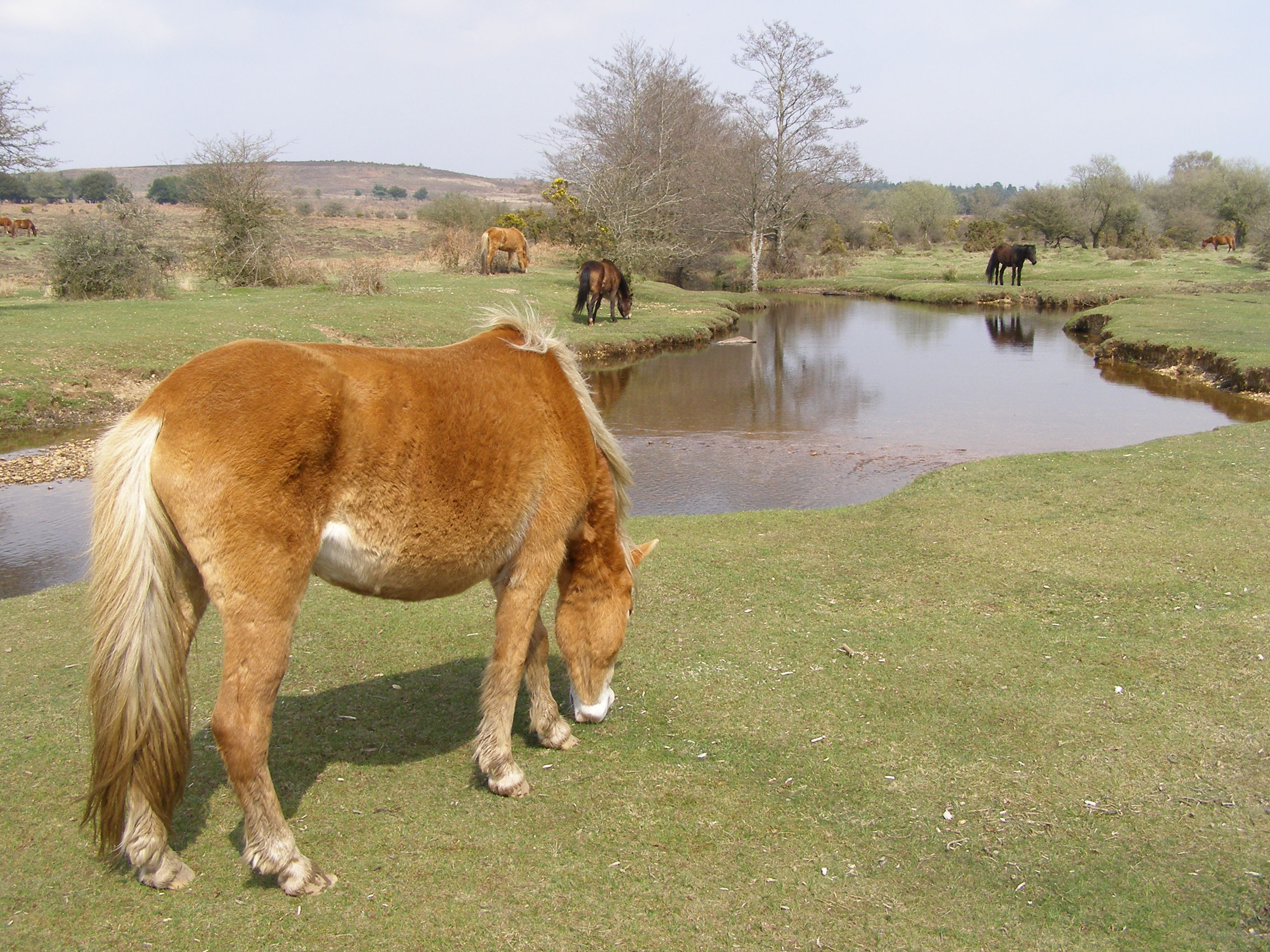
The Latchmore Brook at Latchmore Bottom

The Latchmore Brook is a stream in the New Forest, Hampshire, England. It rises from the elevated gravel plateaus in the north of the Forest, north of Fritham, and drains into the River Avon north of Ibsley. The name was first recorded in 1391 as Lechemere and means either leech pool, or boggy pool.

The stream's catchment is open heathland, deciduous woodland, silvicultural inclosures and, in its lower reaches, small scale pastoral farmland; as such there are no consistent sources of pollution and the stream's course and character has largely remained free from artificial modification. Historically, the greatest human impact on the brook was connected to the Schultze Gunpowder Factory which was established in the 1860s at Eyeworth Lodge near Fritham. The factory required large volumes of water and this demand was met by damming the brook to create a reservoir (which still survives as Eyeworth Pond). The problem of sulphuric and nitric acid discharges contaminating the river, killing fish, only ended when the factory closed in the 1920s.
