= Ocknell Plain =

Countryside area in the New Forest, Hampshire, England

Coordinates: 50.908°N 1.670°W

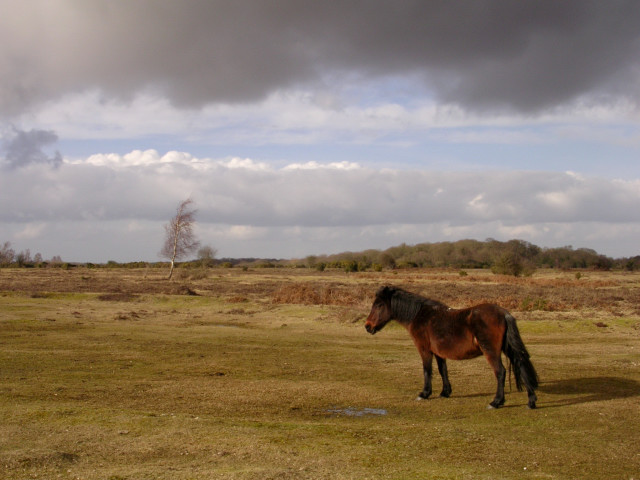
Ocknell Plain

Ocknell Plain can be found in the New Forest near Southampton, England.

The area was used in World War II for the Stoney Cross airfield and it is now very popular with campers and daytrippers. Campsites in the area include Ocknell and Longbeech. The Rufus Stone can be found about a mile east of Ocknell Plain. The nearest settlements are Stoney Cross, Minstead and Fritham.
