= Hugh Tyrrel =

12th century English nobleman

Hugh Tyrrel (Anglo-Norman: Huge Tyrel), 1st Baron of Castleknock (died 1199) was an Anglo-Norman nobleman and crusader who played a prominent part in the Norman invasion of Ireland and took part in the Third Crusade.

Tyrrel was born in Hampshire, England, the son of Hugh Tyrrel the elder, who held substantial lands in England and was also lord of Poix-de-Picardie in France. Their ancestor Walter Tirel (died after 1100) is notorious as the killer (although whether the killing was murder or an accident is still a matter of debate) of King William Rufus. On the death of his elder brother Walter, in about the year 1170, Hugh succeeded to all his father's estates.

== Invasion of Ireland ==
In 1169 when Richard de Clare, 2nd Earl of Pembroke, nicknamed Strongbow, invaded Ireland on behalf of Henry II of England, Tyrrel accompanied him. Strongbow and Tyrrel were 2nd cousins, great-grandchildren of Richard fitz Gilbert de Clare. By 1172, he was described as one of the right-hand men of Hugh de Lacy, Lord of Meath, who conferred on him the feudal barony of Castleknock. He built Castleknock Castle, possibly on the site of an earlier fortification.

When de Lacy left Ireland to join the King in France, he made Tyrrel Constable of Trim Castle. In 1173, the Lordship of Meath was invaded by Ruaidrí Ua Conchobair, High King of Ireland, and Trim Castle was besieged. A poet records Tyrrel's urgent appeal to Strongbow: "Through me the baron sends you word, Old Hugh Tyrrel of Trim, That you aid him in every way".

Tyrrel was forced to evacuate Trim, but Ruaidrí soon withdrew, and Tyrrel quickly reoccupied the castle and strengthened its defences; the same poet records: "Hugh Tyrrel went to Trim, And refortified his fortress, And safeguarded it with great honour".

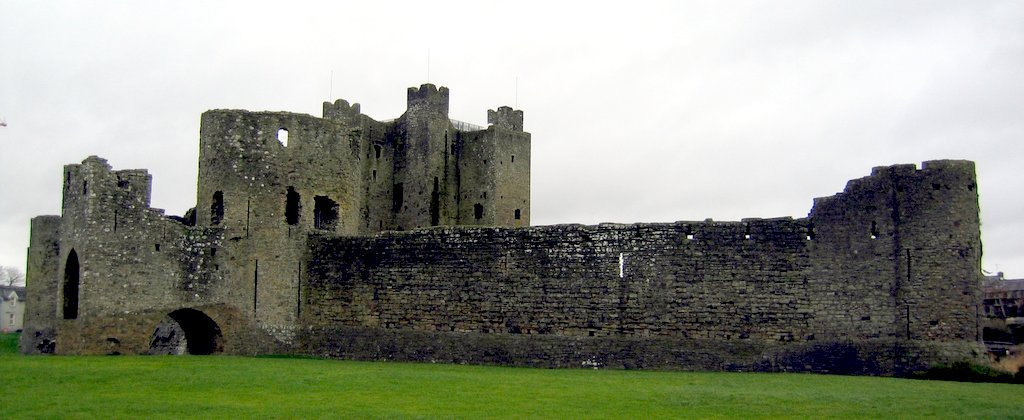
Trim Castle

Despite their earlier friendship, Tyrrel and de Lacy quarrelled in 1185: de Lacy accused Tyrrel of despoiling the monastery of Armagh and carrying away its valuables. Elrington Ball considers the accusation to be most unlikely, noting that Tyrrel was renowned as a benefactor, not a despoiler, of religious houses. In particular, he made a substantial grant of lands in present-day Phoenix Park to the Order of St. John of Jerusalem, whose Irish house was at Kilmainham.

== Third crusade ==
Though described in 1173 as "old Hugh Tyrrel" he was clearly not too old to participate in the Third Crusade, where he was known, for no clear reason, as "the Grecian knight,” and was present at the Siege of Acre in 1189–1191. He died at Selincourt in Picardy in 1199.

Tyrrel married first Isabel de Vignacourt and second Marie de Sennarpont. He had issue by both marriages, including Richard, second baron of Castleknock.
