= Poix-de-Picardie =

- Commune
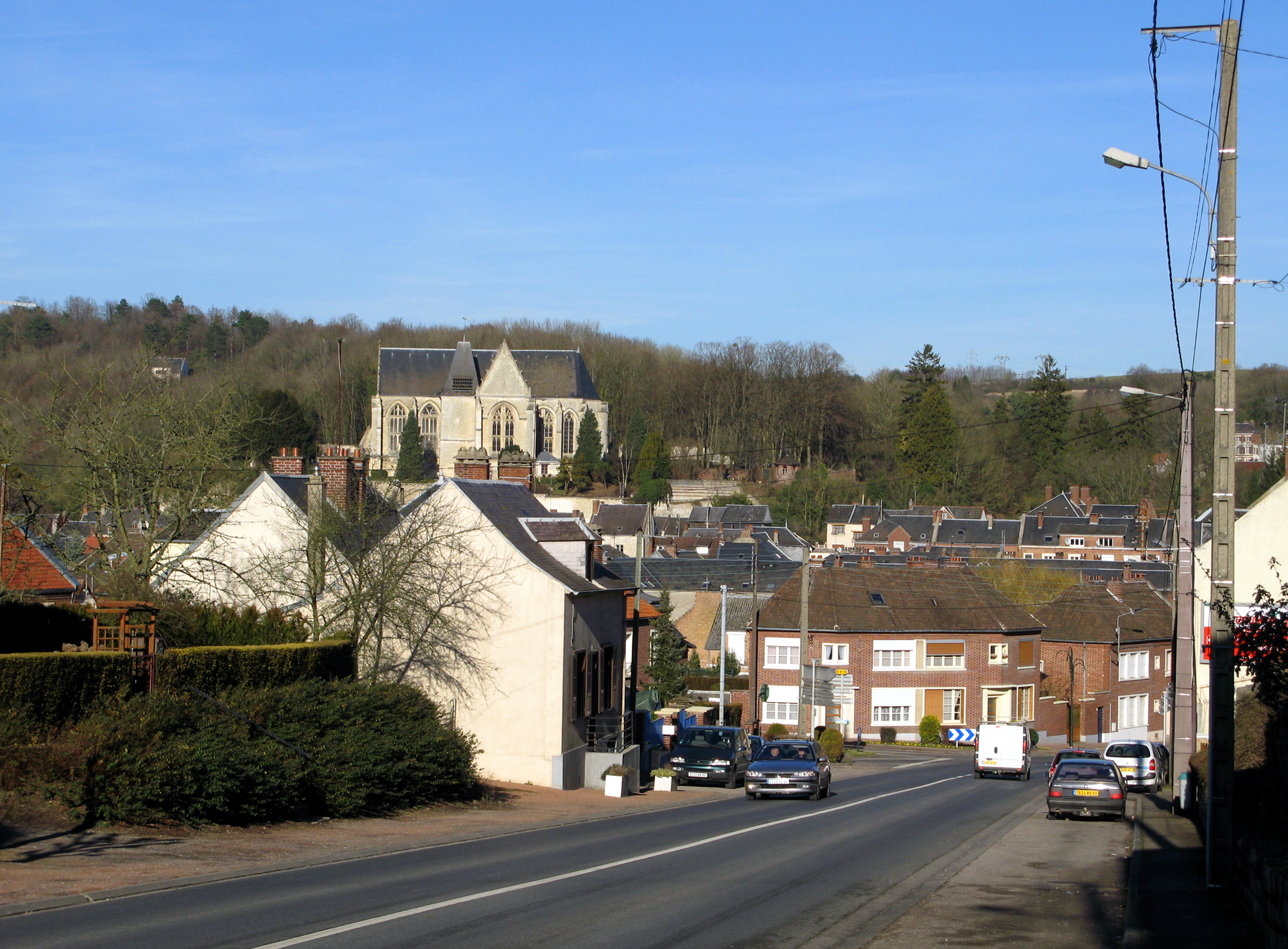
- A general view of Poix-de-Picardie

- Coat of arms
- Location of Poix-de-Picardie
- Location within France Location within Hauts-de-France
- Coordinates: 49°46′36″N 1°59′07″E
- Country: France
- Region: Hauts-de-France
- Department: Somme
- Arrondissement: Amiens
- Canton: Poix-de-Picardie
- Intercommunality: CC Somme Sud-Ouest

Government
  - Mayor (2020–2026): Rose-France Delaire
- Area^{1}: 11.66 km^{2} (4.50 sq mi)
- Elevation: 106 m (348 ft)
- Highest elevation: 190 m (620 ft)
- Lowest elevation: 94 m (308 ft)
- Population (2023): 2,282
  - Density: 195.7/km^{2} (506.9/sq mi)
- Time zone: UTC+01:00 (CET)
  - Summer (DST): UTC+02:00 (CEST)
- INSEE/Postal code: 80630 /80290
- ^{1} French Land Register data, which excludes lakes, ponds, glaciers > 1 km^{2} (0.386 sq mi or 247 acres) and river estuaries.

Poix-de-Picardie (French pronunciation: [pwa də pikaʁdi], literally Poix of Picardy; Picard: Poé-d’Picardie) is a commune in the Somme department in Hauts-de-France in northern France.

== Geography ==
The commune is situated at the junction of the N1 and N29 roads, some 20 miles (32 km) southwest of Amiens, at the bottom of a rather steep-sided valley, confined by Normandy to the south and Picardy to the north. The commune has rail access at the Poix-de-Picardie station, on the Rouen to Amiens line.

== Population ==
Historical population
Year	Pop.	±% p.a.
1968	1,775	—
1975	2,172	+2.93%
1982	2,267	+0.61%
1990	2,191	−0.43%
1999	2,285	+0.47%
2007	2,353	+0.37%
2012	2,391	+0.32%
2017	2,408	+0.14%
2023	2,282	−0.89%
Source: INSEE

== Places of interest ==
- The sixteenth century church of Saint-Denis’ priory. In flamboyant Gothic style, the base of the tower dates from the twelfth century. Before becoming the parish church, it was the chapel of the château.
- Military cemetery. Containing the graves of 149 Second World War Commonwealth aircrew.

== Tyrrel family ==
The Tyrrel, or Tirel, family were Lords of Poix from the twelfth to the fifteenth century. The most famous member of this family was Walter Tirel, who killed King William Rufus of England, son of William the Conqueror; whether it was an accident or an assassination has never been established. Walter's grandson Hugh Tyrrel, baron of Castleknock, played a prominent role in the Norman Conquest of Ireland and in the Third Crusade.

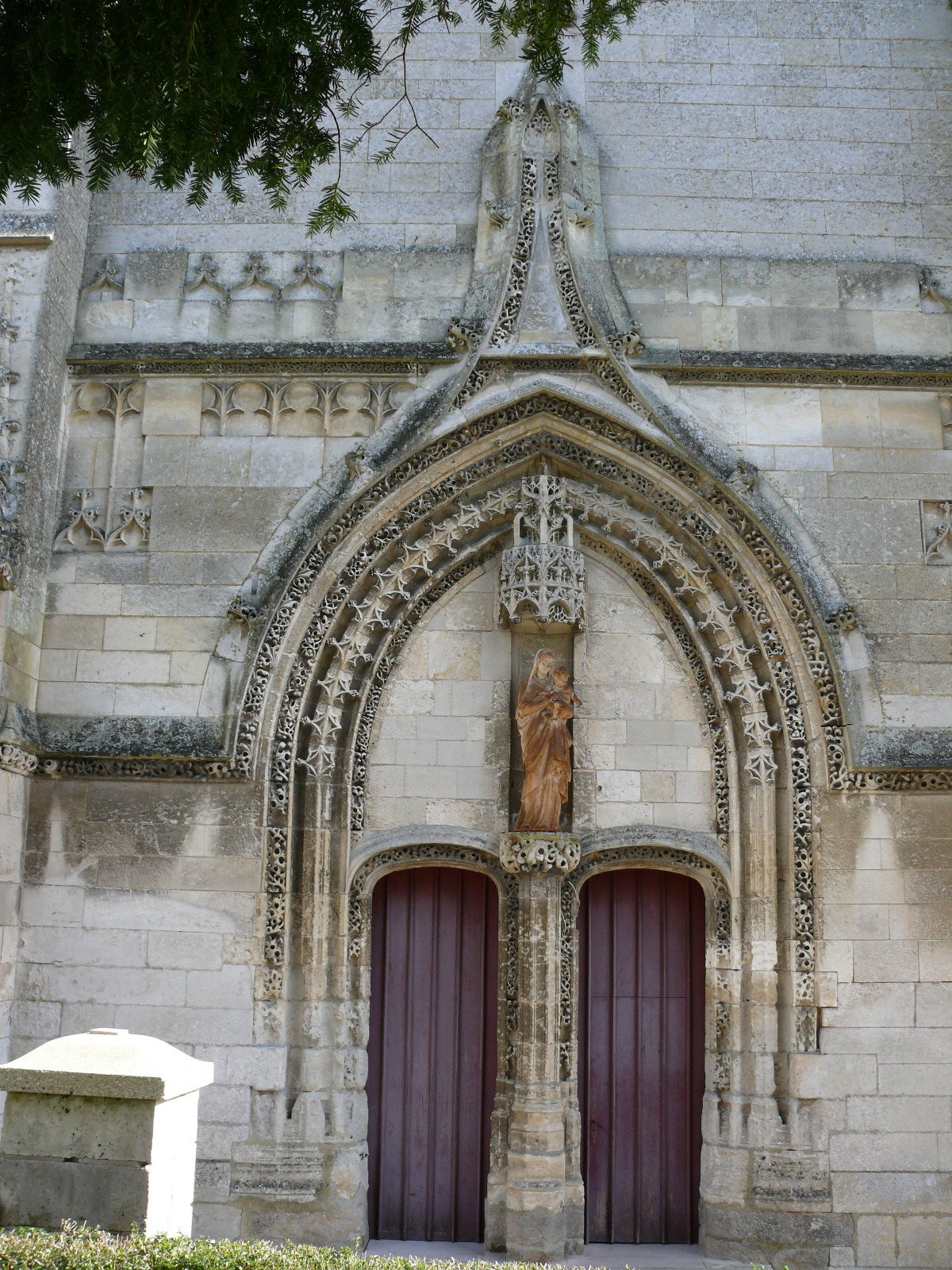
Church porch

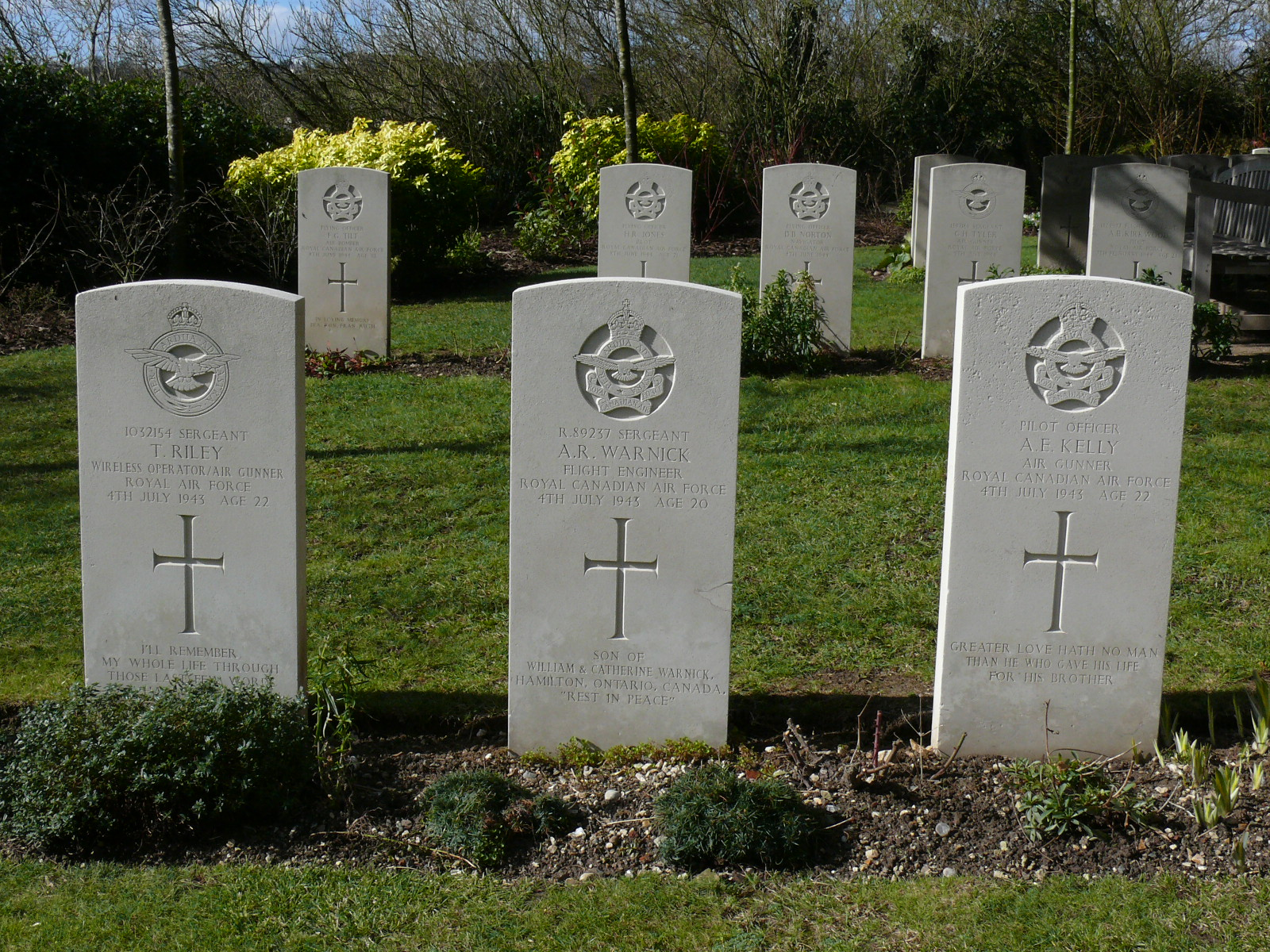
The military cemetery.

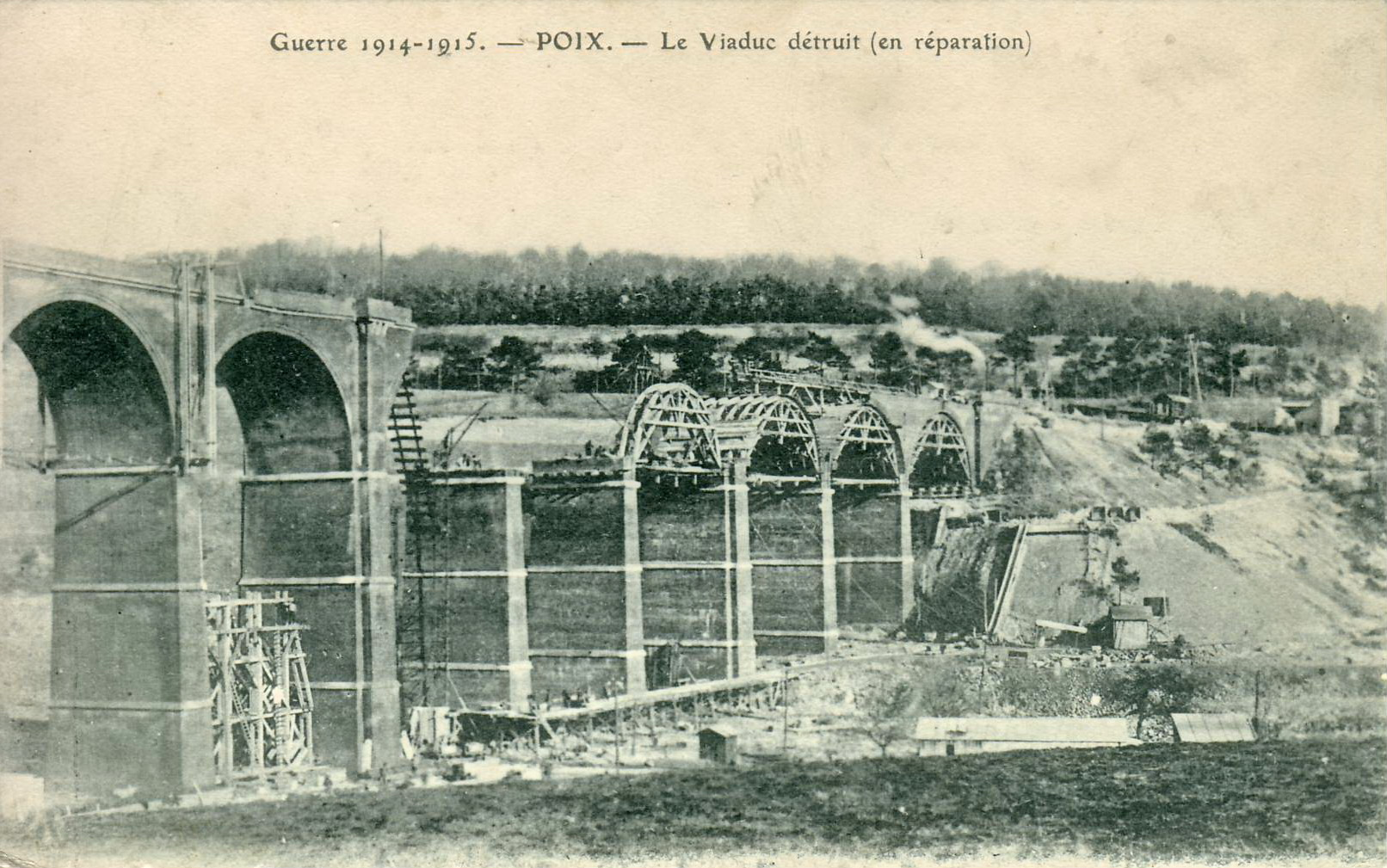
The railway viaduct, under repair after destruction during World War I

== See also ==
- Duke of Poix
- Communes of the Somme department
