= Walter Tirel =

11th- and 12th-century Anglo-Norman nobleman

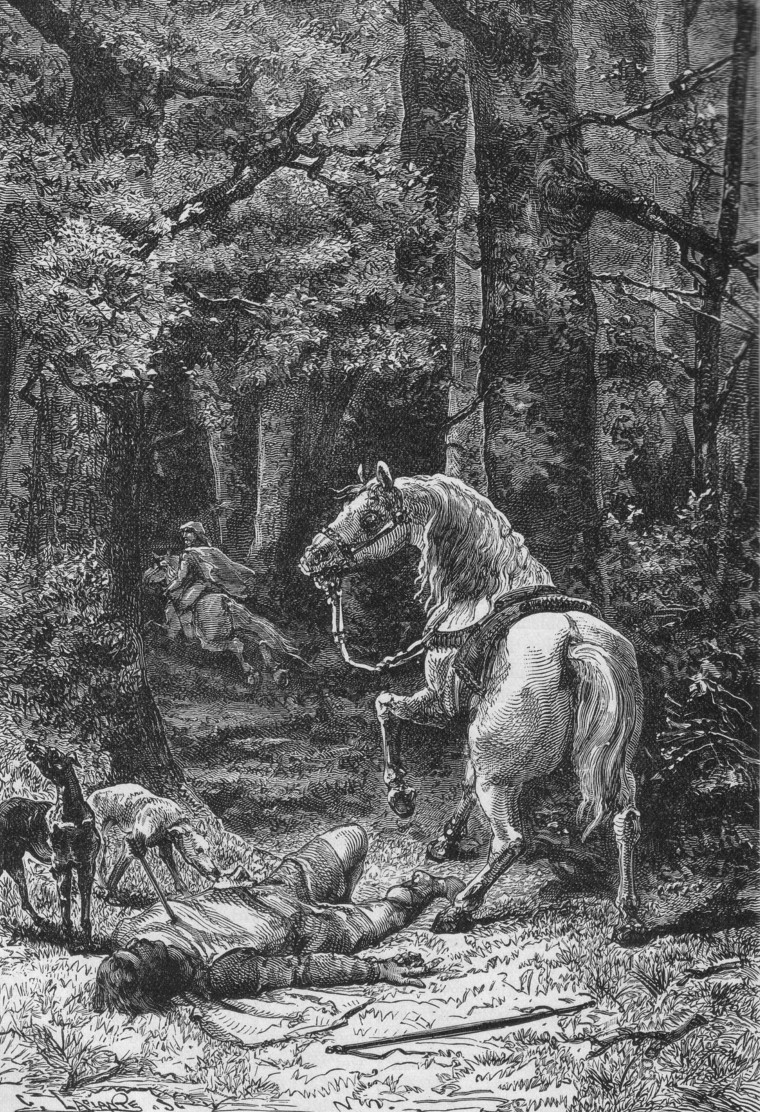
Death of William II. Lithograph, 1895

Walter Tirel III (Note: Also called Tyrell, Tyrrell, Thurold, Turold; French: Gaultier Tirel) (1065 –1136), nicknamed the "Red Knight of Normandie", was an Anglo-Norman nobleman. He is infamous for allegedly accidentally killing King William II of England.

== Life ==
Walter Tirel was born in Tonbridge, Kent, the son of Norman Walter Tirel, and was lord of Poix-de-Picardie in Ponthieu (now in France), and of Langham, Essex (as appears in the Domesday Survey). By marriage, he became linked to the English royal family, having wed Adeliza, the daughter of royal kinsman Richard Fitz Gilbert, who was of the family of Clare. Tirel's father-in-law owned lands in Essex, which he enfeoffed to Tirel. Tiriel died in 1136. He was a friend of St Anselm's.

The grandson of Walter and Adeliza, Hugh Tyrrel, took part in the Norman Conquest of Ireland and became the first baron of Castleknock.

== Death of William II ==
=== Confirmed events ===
On 2 August 1100, Tirel was among a party of noblemen who joined King William II for a hunt in the New Forest. The hunt began at an unusually late hour; it was after midday lunch instead of the customary early morning. Among the hunting party were Henry (William's younger brother, future King Henry I), Robert de Beaumont (Count of Meulan), Henry de Beaumont (Earl of Warwick, Robert's brother), Robert Fitzhamon, William of Breteuil, Gilbert of Clare (Tirel's brother-in-law) and Roger of Clare (Gilbert's brother, another brother-in-law of Tirel). (Note: Hollister criticises the statement that the Clare brothers were part of the hunting party.) That afternoon, the king was shot and killed by an arrow.

William's dead body was left deserted in the forest, and was found by peasants. The peasants brought the late king's body to Winchester.

=== William of Malmesbury ===
According to the chronicler William of Malmesbury, who wrote his account circa 1125, William II died from an arrow to the chest. Both Malmesbury and Orderic Vitalis accuse Tirel of loosing the arrow which killed the king.

William was presented with six arrows, on the eve of the hunt; taking four for himself, he handed the other two to Tirel, saying, "Bon archer, bonnes fleches" ("[To the] good archer, [the] good arrows.")

According to Malmesbury, William's hunting group dispersed as they moved further into the forest, and William was left alone with Tirel. As evening was drawing in, the king took aim at a stag and wounded it. The stag ran away, and the king shielded his eyes from the sun as he watched it run into the setting sun. At that moment, Tirel shot at another stag, and "unknowingly and without power to prevent it he sent his fatal arrow through the king’s breast." William silently broke the arrow off his body then fell onto his wound, driving the arrow further into his body. The king died almost immediately. Tirel rushed to the king's aid, and upon discovering that the king was dead, he quickly fled. A version of this tale is given by William of Malmesbury in his Chronicle of the Kings of the English (c. 1128), in which Tirel is referred to as "Walter Thurold":

The day before the king died he dreamt that he went to hell and the Devil said to him "I can't wait for tomorrow because we can finally meet in person!". He suddenly awoke. He commanded a light to be brought, and forbade his attendants to leave him. The next day he went into the forest ... He was attended by a few persons ... Walter Thurold remained with him, while the others, were on the chase. The sun was now declining, when the king, drawing his bow and letting fly an arrow, slightly wounded a stag which passed before him ... The stag was still running ... The king, followed it a long time with his eyes, holding up his hand to keep off the power of the sun's rays. At this instant Walter decided to kill another stag. Oh, gracious God! the arrow pierced the king's breast.

On receiving the wound the king uttered not a word; but breaking off the shaft of the arrow where it projected from his body ... This accelerated his death. Walter immediately ran up, but as he found him senseless, he leapt upon his horse, and escaped with the utmost speed. Indeed there were none to pursue him: some helped his flight; others felt sorry for him.

The king's body was placed on a cart and conveyed to the cathedral at Winchester... blood dripped from the body all the way. Here he was buried within the tower. The next year, the tower fell down. William Rufus died in 1100 ... aged forty years. He was a man much pitied by the clergy ... he had a soul which they could not save... He was loved by his soldiers but hated by the people because he caused them to be plundered.

— William of Malmesbury, Gesta Regum Anglorum [Chronicle of the Kings of the English] (c.1128)

=== Orderic Vitalis ===
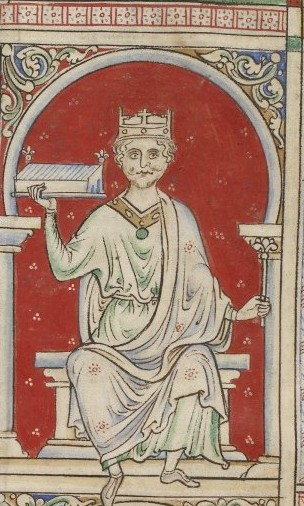
William II

Orderic Vitalis's account, written circa 1135, tells a similar tale. He states that Tirel

...got up, mounted his horse and sped into the wood. Count Henry ([William Rufus's] brother) and William de Breteuil and other great men were there; they went into the woodland, and the huntsman were scattered in their various positions. The king and [Tirel] established themselves with a few companions in the wood, and waited eagerly for the prey, with weapons ready. Suddenly a beast ran between them; the king jumped back from his place, and Walter let an arrow fly. The arrow shaved the hair on the animal's back, sped on and wounded the king standing beyond. He soon fell to the ground, and died—proh dolor!—instantly.

— Vitalis (c.1135)

Both Malmesbury and Orderic tell roughly the same story. This was the most common story believed at the time.

=== Other accounts ===
The French abbot Suger stated circa 1144 that he himself had heard that Tirel denied that he was nearby the king during the hunt. In John of Salisbury's Life of St. Anselm, it is stated that many thought the king had accidentally shot himself. In the late twelfth century, Gerald of Wales named a different bowman as the king's accidental killer.

According to Eadmer, there was dispute on the specifics of William's death; whether he fell over and pushed the arrow into himself, or if the arrow's shot killed him outright. The Anglo-Saxon Chronicle states that William "was killed with an arrow while hunting by one of his men" and credits the death as an act of god brought on by William's sin.

If Malmesbury was correct in stating that Tirel and the king were alone when the shooting occurred, then Tirel would be the only source for how the king died. However, Tirel repeatedly denied that he had shot the king. Christopher Brooke states that, if Tirel's shooting was an accident, then it is unusual that he did not take credit for the "act of god" the shooting was seen as.

Tirel later asserted under oath that he was not in the same part of the forest as the king that day, and that he had not even seen the king that day.

=== Possible conspiracy by Henry ===
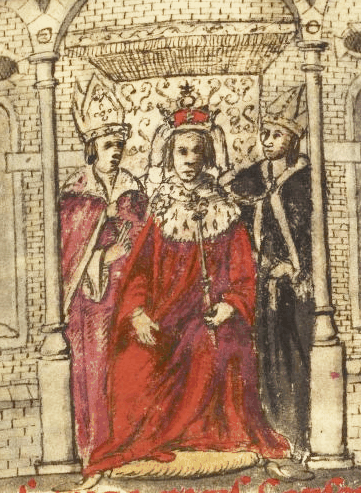
17th-century depiction of the coronation of Henry I

Due to the striking nature of William's death, it has evoked various conspiracy theories and hypotheses.

At the time, William's death was accepted as an accident, but it has been suggested that it was an assassination. It has been long suggested that Tirel, who allegedly killed William, was acting under orders from William's younger brother Henry. Henry was a member of the hunting party, and the resultant circumstances were very favourable to Henry. Three days after his older brother's death, on 5 August, Henry was crowned. Poole suggests that Henry may have used Tirel to ascend to the throne, pointing out that once Henry became king, he treated the family of Clare with favour. In contrast, Hollister states that Henry's prompt leave of the forest to go secure his estates does not suggest a conspiracy.

On the subsequent hunt, the party spread out as they chased their prey, and William, in the company of Tirel, became separated from the others. It was the last time that William was seen alive.

William's older brother and also his nephew were also killed in the New Forest. According to legend, Tirel washed his hands of the king's blood in Ocknell Pond, and thus every year the pond turns red. It is also legend that a great black dog called Tirel’s Hound can be seen in the forest as an omen of death.

Tirel fled to his lordship in France, an action which has been viewed by historians as an admission of guilt. However, at the time hunting was unsafe and not well-managed, and accidents were not uncommon. Additionally, fratricide was considered particularly ungodly and heinous, and even rumours would have undermined Henry’s right to rule. Whether or not Tirel was responsible for the king's death, the accusation alone would have been dangerous to him.

Tirel's hunting party companions also fled to secure their estates, once they heard of the king's death.

The highly unlikely theory that William's killing was premeditated by a cult related to witchcraft has also emerged. Another improbable theory states that the killing was organised by the future Louis VI.

=== Murder or accident? ===
To some chroniclers, such an "Act of God" was a just end for a wicked king. However, over the centuries, the obvious suggestion that one of William's many enemies may have had a hand in this extraordinary event has been repeatedly made. Even chroniclers of the time point out that Walter was renowned as a keen bowman, and unlikely to loose such an impetuous shot. William's brother Henry, who was among the hunting party that day, benefited directly from William's death, as he was shortly after crowned king. Henry, who once threw a man off a tower to his death, was not normally troubled by moral scruples: on the other hand it has been argued that fratricide was then regarded as a particularly horrible crime, and even the suspicion of it would have done great harm to the new King's reputation. It may be significant, as Henry's modern biographer remarks, that nobody at the time seems to have had any such suspicions: contemporaries took it for granted that the death was an accident, such accidents being common enough.

No early source mentions the shooting as being an act of malice. Christopher Brooke states that, if there was any conspiracy, it was incredibly well-concealed.

Abbot Suger, another chronicler, was Thurold's friend and sheltered him in his French exile. He said later:

It was laid to the charge of a certain noble, Walter Thurold, that he had shot the king with an arrow; but I have often heard him, when he had nothing to fear nor to hope, solemnly swear that on the day in question he was not in the part of the forest where the king was hunting, nor ever saw him in the forest at all.

— Abbot Suger

=== Rufus Stone ===
The point where it is claimed that Rufus fell is marked with the Rufus Stone near Minstead in the New Forest. Tirel's name is written as "Sir Walter Tyrrell" on the stone. The "Sir Walter Tyrrell" pub is nearby.
