= Castleknock Castle =

Ruined Norman castle in Dublin, Ireland

- Caisleán Cnucha
- Castleknock, Dublin, Ireland
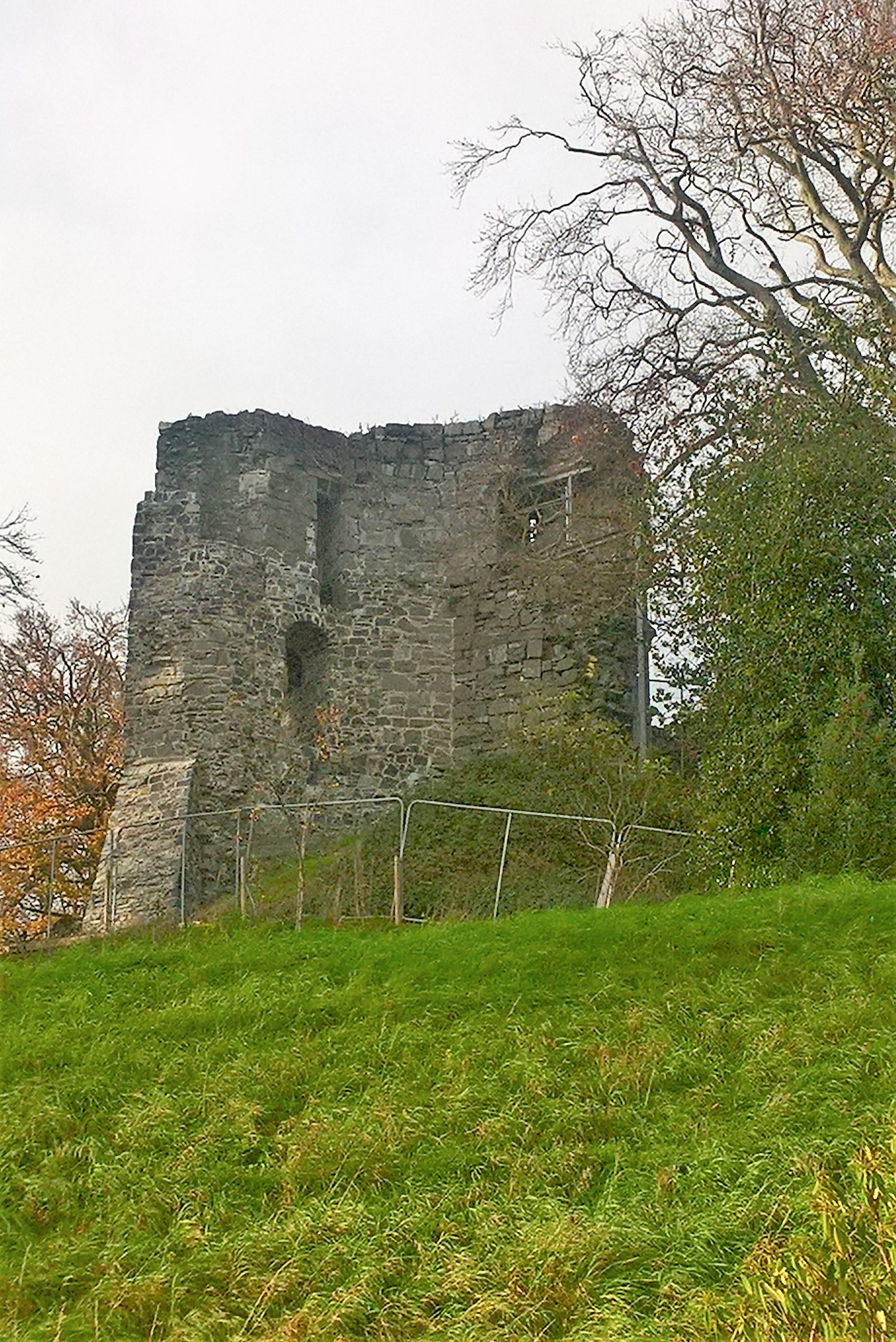
- Castleknock Castle atop the motte in November 2018

Site information
- Type: Norman castle
- Owner: St. Vincent's Castleknock College
- Open to the public: No
- Condition: Ruined

Location
- Location within Ireland
- Coordinates: 53.368212°N 6.369816°W
- Height: 24 m (former keep)

Site history
- Built: Late 12th century
- Built by: Hugh Tyrrel
- Materials: Stone
- Battles/wars: Edward Bruce's campaign (1317); War of the Three Kingdoms
- Events: Captured by Edward Bruce (1317); destroyed after 1647

Castleknock Castle is a ruined Norman castle in Dublin, Ireland. It is now the site of St. Vincent's Castleknock College, an all-boys Catholic school. The Irish name of Castleknock is Caisleán Cnucha, derived from the older forms Cnoc and Cnucha mentioned in medieval sources.

== History ==
=== Early history ===
There is evidence of the site's importance in pre-modern times. In 1861, an ancient altar tomb known as a cromlech was discovered in the castle's interior.

Several medieval sources, including the Annals of the Four Masters, the Annals of Ulster, and the Annals of Tigernach, mention the site under its Irish name, Cnucha.

=== Norman period ===
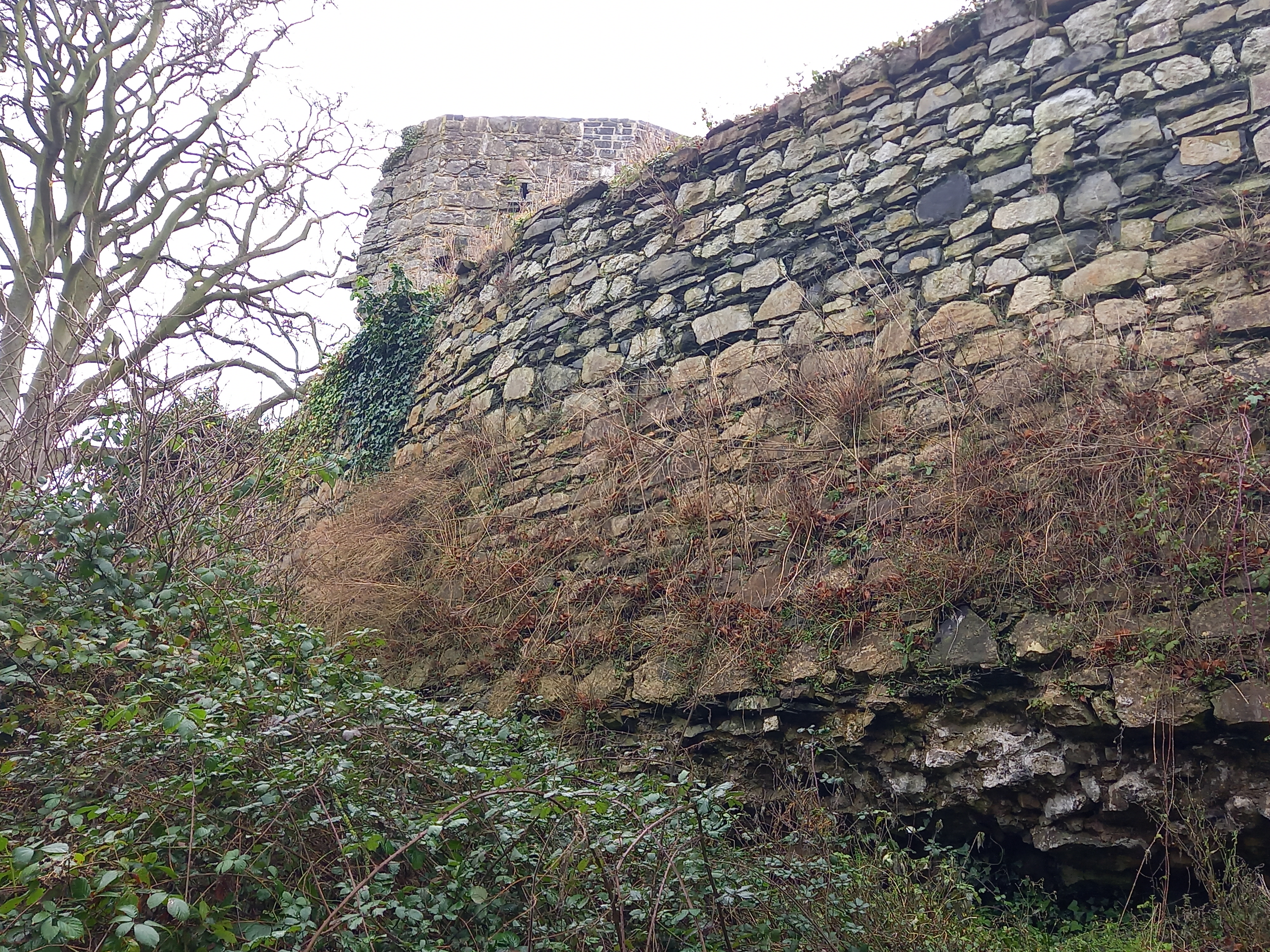
Fosse and outer wall of Castleknock Castle

During the Anglo-Norman invasion of Ireland, Castleknock was the final rallying point for the forces of the last High King of Ireland, Rory O'Connor. Following the triumph of the Anglo-Normans, the knight Hugh Tyrrel was granted the barony of Castleknock, where he would construct a castle by the same name, choosing the location for its command over the route to Dublin. The newly built fortress was equipped with the latest technology in warfare, featuring heavy battlements and two deep ditches.

In 1184, the Abbey of St. Brigid was founded by Richard Tyrrel, the second Baron of Castleknock. The abbey continued to flourish until it was demolished as part of the dissolution of the monasteries in the 16th century, when it was replaced by a Protestant church.

During the First War of Scottish Independence, the Scottish king Robert the Bruce launched an invasion of Ireland. In 1317, his forces, led by his brother Edward Bruce, captured Castleknock Castle while en route to besiege Dublin with a force of 20,000 men. The Baron of Castleknock and his wife were taken prisoner and Edward made the castle his headquarters. The capture, however, did not last long, as Edward lacked the necessary supplies for a prolonged siege in such a well-fortified location. The two prisoners were made to pay a ransom and then freed, with the Scottish forces vacating Castleknock the next day.

==== The Lady of the Castle ====
In the late medieval period, a legend sprang up surrounding the kidnapping of Eibhleen O'Brinn, the daughter of a Wicklow chieftain. According to the legend, the brother of the Baron of Castleknock, possibly Roger Tyrrel, abducted her and imprisoned her in the castle's turret. Eibhleen, fearing the worst for herself, opted for suicide, using her breast-pin to open a vein in her neck. Unbeknownst to her, her father was already on the march towards Castleknock with his armed forces. In the ensuing battle, Tyrrel was killed. In subsequent years, a folk superstition claimed that a female figure, robed in white, could be seen moving slowly around the castle at midnight. This, they said, was Eibhleen, and they called her the Lady of the Castle or the White Lady of Castleknock.

When distant chimes sound midnight hour,
The spirit pure is seen;
And moving round the lonely tower,
Looks bright as moonlight beam.
And as the moonbeams tint the walls,
And light the turret's crest,

"'Twas hence," she says, "my spirit fled,
'Tis here my bones find rest.
And here I wander, year by year,
For such my lot has been,
But soon at end my penance drear,
I'll rest in joy unseen."

— An anonymous 19th-century poem

=== English Civil War ===
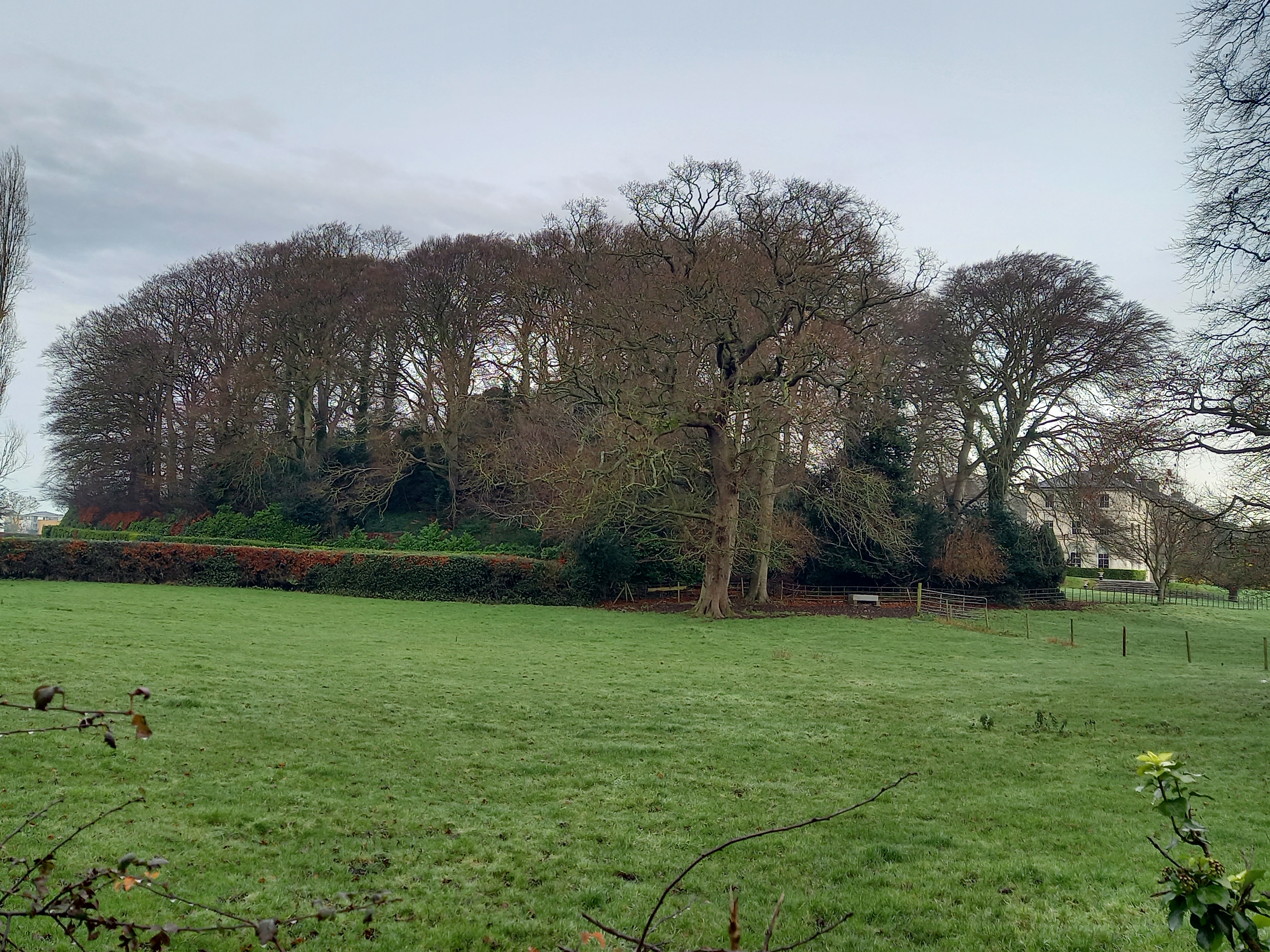
Wooded hill from the Carpenterstown Road

The castle, which by the 17th century had fallen out of the hands of the Tyrrels, was partially destroyed after the War of the Three Kingdoms, largely owing to considerable artillery damage. The English, led by General Monck, had taken it in 1642 with the help of heavy cannon fire; five years later, in 1647, it was retaken by the Irish following Owen Roe O'Neill's siege. However, after failing to capture nearby Dublin, O'Neill retreated from the position, using scorched earth policy to prevent the advancing English from using the land to their benefit. After the war, the newly established Commonwealth government ordered the dismantling of the battered castle. The estate of Castleknock was then divided between several private tenants.

=== Present day ===
In 1834, 40 acres of Castleknock, including the ruins of the castle, were sold to a Vincentian friar, John McCann. There, he founded a seminary called St. Vincent's Ecclesiastical Seminary, now known as St. Vincent's Castleknock College.

The plot of land enclosed within the old walls of the castle is now used as a cemetery.

== Building ==
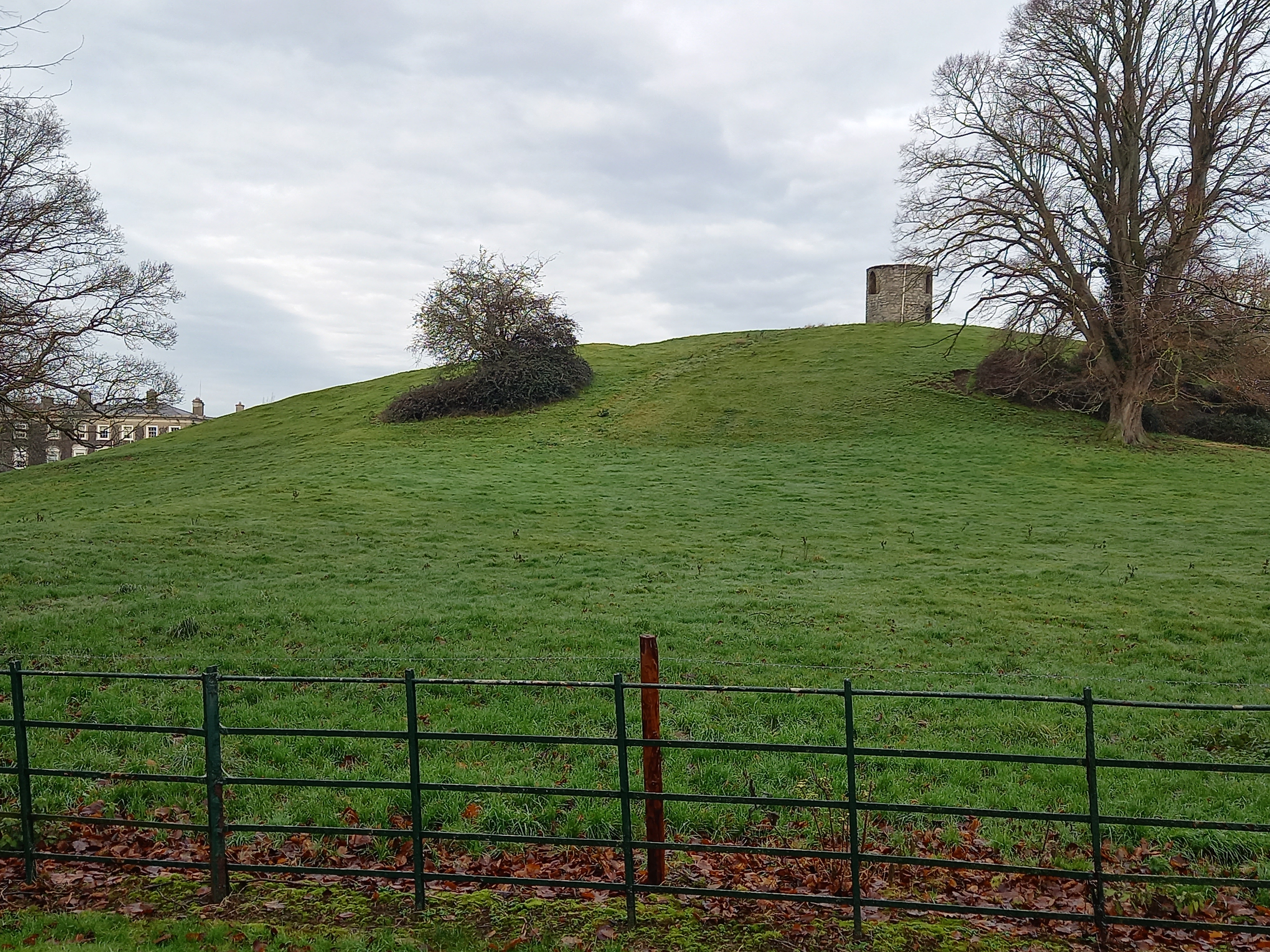
Remains of a windmill on a hill at St. Vincent's Castleknock College

While it was still intact, the polygonal keep, measuring about 24m in height, was the most notable feature of the castle, giving a commanding view over the route to Dublin. A large squat building was attached to it. A curtain wall, interspersed with towers, surrounded the castle, which was further protected by two deep moats.

Today, the site is surrounded by trees, obscuring the view of the ruins from the road except in winter, when the trees lose their leaves. There is also a small mound west of the main Castleknock College campus known as Windmill Hill. A water tower, originally built as an observatory by a previous owner, Simon Guinn, now stands on the hill.

== Books ==
- Dónal MacPolin and Peter Sobolewski, Blanchardstown, Castleknock and the Park, 2001, Cottage Publications ISBN 1-900935-22-8
- James O'Driscoll, Cnucha: A history of Castleknock and district, 1977, privately issued
- Jim Lacey, A Candle in the Window, 1999 Marino Publications ISBN 978-1-85635-552-0
- Tadhg O'Keeffe, Medieval Irish Buildings, pp 230–231 2015 Four Courts Press ISBN 978-1-84682-248-3
