= Brook, New Forest =

Hamlet in Hampshire, England

Coordinates: 50.924706°N 1.610822°W

Brook
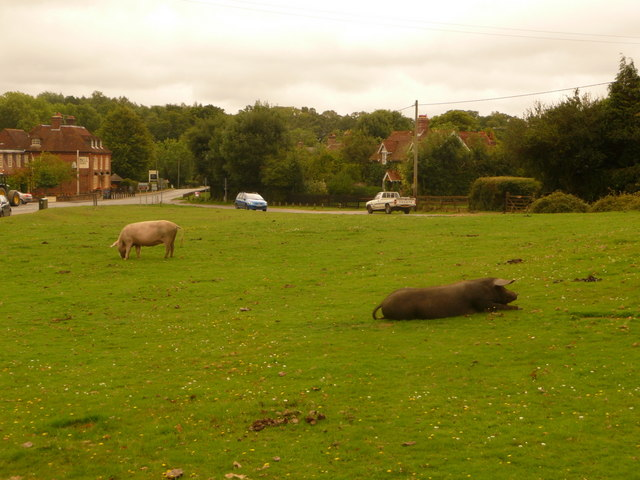
- Village green at Brook

- Location within Hampshire
- OS grid reference: SU273140
- Civil parish: Bramshaw
- District: New Forest
- Shire county: Hampshire
- Region: South East
- Country: England
- Sovereign state: United Kingdom
- Post town: Lyndhurst
- Postcode district: SO43
- Dialling code: 023
- Police: Hampshire and Isle of Wight
- Fire: Hampshire and Isle of Wight
- Ambulance: South Central
- UK Parliament: New Forest East
- Website: Bramshaw Parish Council

Brook is a hamlet in the civil parish of Bramshaw, in Hampshire, England. It lies just inside the New Forest.

The hamlet contains a mix of 18th and 19th century cottages, just south of the village of Bramshaw. There are two inns in Brook on opposite sides of the road – The Green Dragon and The Bell Inn. Both buildings date from the 18th century, albeit with 19th and 20th century alterations. Brook is also home to the club-house of Bramshaw Golf Club, which claims to be the oldest golf club in Hampshire.

Just south of the village at Lower Canterton lies the Rufus Stone. This stone is said to mark the place where in 1100 the then King of England, William Rufus, was killed by an arrow whilst out hunting. The arrow was fired by a French nobleman, Walter Tyrell, but it has never been established if the death was an accident or murder.

== Sport ==
Brook and the surrounding parish are home to Bramshaw Cricket Club, founded in 1887. The club plays at Roundhill, within the New Forest National Park, and fields multiple adult and junior teams. Over the years, the club has been associated with a number of long-serving local players, including Ken Webb, Boyd Hilton, and Bailey Loveless, who are regarded as notable figures in the club's history.
