= Bramshaw =

Village and parish in Hampshire, England

Coordinates: 50.94359°N 1.61787°W

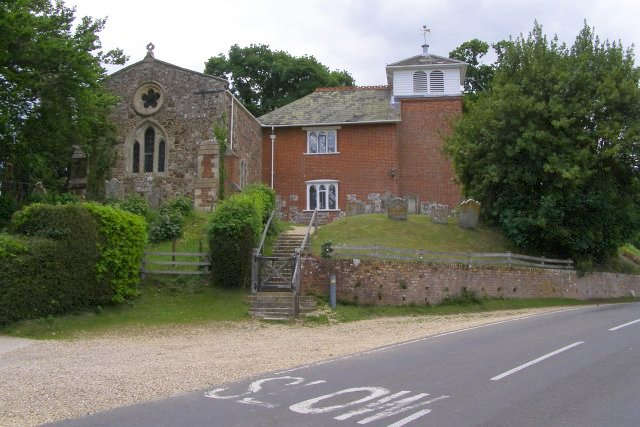
- St Peter's Church, Bramshaw

- Location within Hampshire
- Population: 684; 677 (2011 Census including Fritham)
- OS grid reference: SU269161
- District: New Forest
- Shire county: Hampshire
- Region: South East
- Country: England
- Sovereign state: United Kingdom
- Post town: LYNDHURST
- Postcode district: SO43
- Dialling code: 023 / 017
- Police: Hampshire and Isle of Wight
- Fire: Hampshire and Isle of Wight
- Ambulance: South Central
- UK Parliament: New Forest East

Bramshaw is a small village and civil parish in Hampshire, England. It lies just inside the New Forest. The name Bramshaw means Bramble Wood.

Until 1895, Bramshaw was divided between Wiltshire and Hampshire. The village of Bramshaw is stretched out for several miles along the B3079 road, with the church to the north, the hamlet of Brook to the south and Stock's Cross at its centre.

== Overview ==
Bramshaw is a village and civil parish in the New Forest National Park. It includes large tracts of land owned by the National Trust, and Crown Land administered by the Forestry Commission. It is located some 10 miles west of Southampton. The parish contains the hamlets of Brook and Fritham. The parish also contains the highest point in the New Forest at Pipers Wait, some 129 metres above mean sea level.

== Heritage ==
Bramshaw Commons, owned by the National Trust, comprise some 575 hectares (1,420 acres) of manorial wastes and commons. It is some of the best surviving examples of lowland heath in Europe, still managed by the common grazing of ponies, pigs, donkeys, cattle and sheep.

The site of a 14th-century Royal Hunting Lodge ("Studley Castle"), a Scheduled Monument, can be seen nearby. The site of former stocks and gallows can be seen at Stocks Cross, at the intersection of Furzley Lane and the B3079. The gallows were still in use in 1831, when records show that they were repaired. The Admiralty Shutter Telegraph Line had a station at Telegraph Hill, near Bramshaw. It was an optical shutter signal station used as a communication link for the Admiralty during the Napoleonic Wars.

== Possession ==
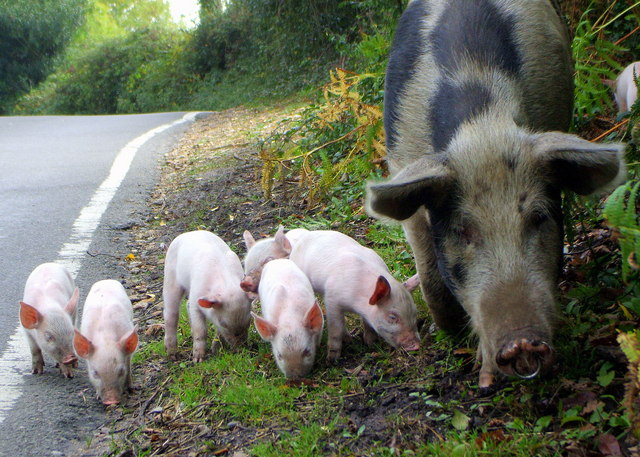
Pigs grazing on the road at Bramshaw

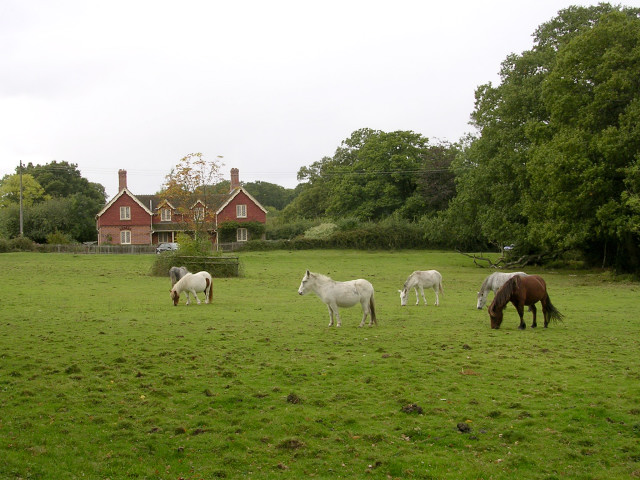
Stock's Cross – site of a former stocks and gallows

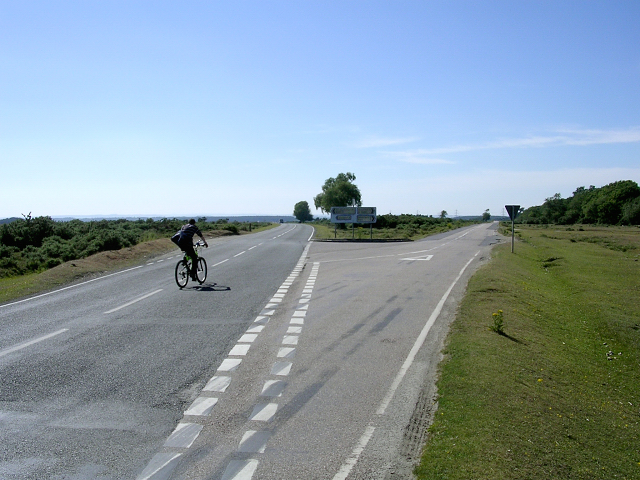
Telegraph Hill, the site of a former Admiralty signal station

Bramshaw appears twice in the Domesday Book for Wiltshire, when the lands were held by Wulfnoth and a certain Edmund. Odo of Bayeux was overlord of these lands in Bramshaw at the time of the Survey. The name Bramshaw probably derives from an Old English word for "bramble bush wood." It may be that it is Bramshaw being referred to in 1418 in a legal record, (appearing as Bremelelsthaw).

The manor of Bramshaw, together with that of Britford, appears to have been granted by one of the Norman kings to the family of de Lacy sometime during the 12th century. In the 15th century, it was sold to Robert Lord Hungerford. It switched hands during the Wars of the Roses, but in 1485 it was back in the hands of the Hungerford family, being awarded to Mary Hungerford, wife of Sir Edward Hastings. Their grandson, the third Earl, sold the manor of Bramshaw (which from this time seems to have been also known as "Moore Closes") in 1561. It was sold several times in the next 150 years, until it was purchased in 1713 by Richard Paulet, in whose family the manor remained until 1887.

== Government ==
Bramshaw was partly in Wiltshire and partly in Hampshire until the "County of Southampton Act 1894" placed it all into Hampshire. The county boundary ran through the churchyard, and through the church, which had its nave in Wiltshire and its chancel in Hampshire. There were separate parish councils, one for Bramshaw (Hampshire) and one for Bramshaw (Wiltshire), which survived as Bramshaw (West) and Bramshaw (East) until 1932 when they were unified.

== Church ==
Saint Peter's church belonged at an early date to the Premonstratensian priory of Britford. In 1158, however, Henry II granted the church to Salisbury Cathedral, when it was appropriated to the resident canons, and from that date the patronage was in the hands of the Dean and chapter of Salisbury. The current church dates from the 13th century, albeit with many later additions. The earliest part of the church is the west end of the nave, which is of mid-13th-century date, and there is a cambered beam roof of late 15th century date. Much of the rest of the church, including the chancel and vestry, are of 19th century construction.

== Education ==
Bramshaw village school was founded in 1812 and closed in July 1977. Through those 165 years it served the children of Bramshaw and nearby hamlets in the New Forest, Brook, Fritham and Furzley. Children passed through Bramshaw School, usually on their way to labouring and servant jobs in the forest and on the estates.

The school began life as a Boys' School, registered as a National School in 1812 with the Girls' and Infants' School being registered in 1819. At that time it was described as 'privately owned', only being registered as a Public Elementary School in 1851 when it began to be supported with government funding. George Eyre (1772–1837), owner of the local Warrens Estate. founded the school, 'demonstrating a paternalistic attitude to the labourers and their children, while providing a picturesque addition to the village scene'. The school remained connected to the Eyre family until the death of the Mrs Eyre in 1933.

After the Education Act 1944 introduced the eleven plus examination, older boys and girls moved to a new Secondary Modern School at Bartley, leaving two classes of 5 to 7 and 7 to 11-year-olds. When the school closed in 1977, 5 to 8+ year olds went to Copythorne First School while children from 8+ to 12+ went to Bartley Middle School. The school building has become a private dwelling.
