= Eyeworth Pond =

Man-made pond in Hampshire, England

Coordinates: 50.9304°N 1.6767°W

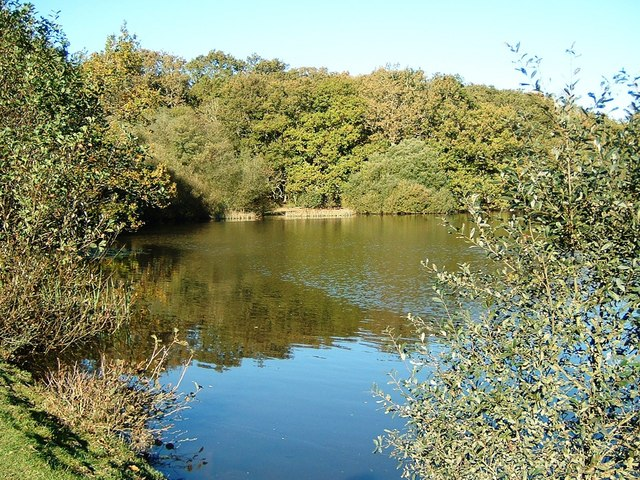
Eyeworth Pond

Eyeworth Pond is a pond located near Fritham in the New Forest, in Hampshire, England.

The pond was created in 1871 by damming Latchmore Brook, with the purpose of supplying water to a nearby gunpowder factory. The factory, the Schultze Gunpowder Factory, was based at Eyeworth Lodge and began making powder for sporting guns in 1859. Ten years later Edward Schultze took charge of the factory and began production of smokeless gunpowder on a large scale, employing around 100 people at the height of production. The factory closed in 1921 but the pond remains to this day.

A small population of the introduced Mandarin duck is resident on the pond, which is surrounded by ancient woodland.

A picnic site is located on its south side.
