= Minstead =

Village and parish in Hampshire, England

Coordinates: 50.902675°N 1.609734°W

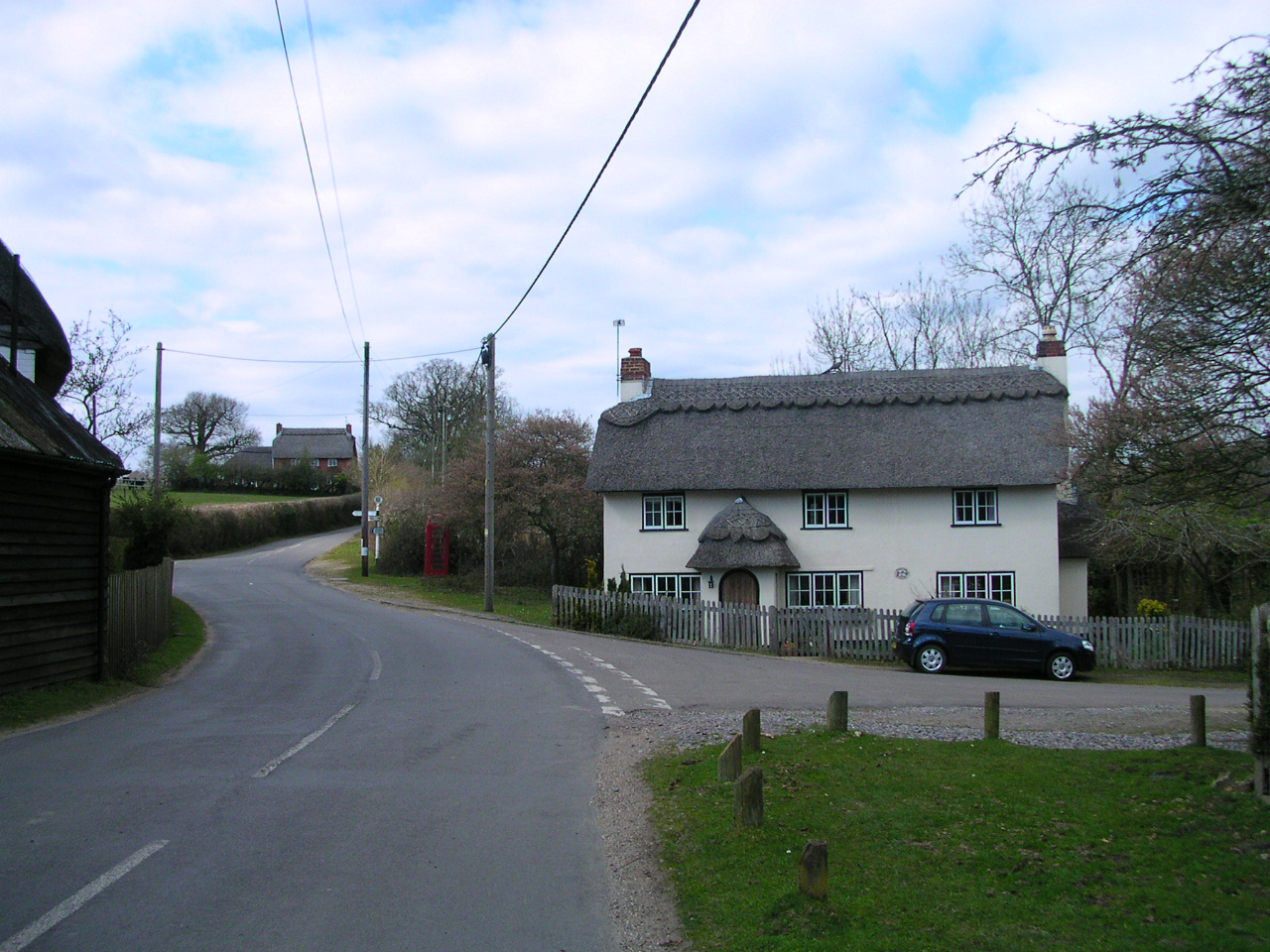
- Minstead

- Location within Hampshire
- Population: 687 (2021 census)
- OS grid reference: SU275115
- District: New Forest
- Shire county: Hampshire
- Region: South East
- Country: England
- Sovereign state: United Kingdom
- Post town: Lyndhurst
- Postcode district: SO43
- Dialling code: 023
- Police: Hampshire and Isle of Wight
- Fire: Hampshire and Isle of Wight
- Ambulance: South Central
- UK Parliament: New Forest East

Minstead is a small village and civil parish in the New Forest, Hampshire, about 2 miles (3.2 km) north of Lyndhurst and south of the A31 road.

There is a pub, the Trusty Servant, and a village shop. The 13th-century All Saints' church is on a small hill.

The majority of the parish area is a complex of woodland, heathland, acid grassland, scrub and valley bog, supporting a diversity of wildlife.

North of the village on the north side of the A31 at Lower Canterton lies the Rufus Stone, said to mark the place where in 1100 King William II ("William Rufus") was killed by an arrow whilst out hunting. Also north of the village, south of the A31, Furzey Gardens contain 8 acres (3.2 ha) of landscaped gardens containing many interesting and rare plants. There is also a gallery, open to the public from March to October, as well as a tree house and play area for children.

== History ==
People have lived in the area of Minstead since prehistoric times. Paleolithic tools have been found here, and there are several Bronze Age barrows within the parish. There is an Iron Age hillfort at Malwood covering 1.8 hectares. It was on or near this hillfort that a medieval beacon was situated, receiving signals from Marchwood and from Freshwater on the Isle of Wight. There is a modern house in the middle of the hillfort which is privately owned.

Minstead is listed in the Domesday Book of 1086. Before the Norman Conquest, Minstead, assessed at three-and-a-half hides, was held by a Godric Malf, whose sons in 1086 were holding half a hide as the remaining 3 hides had been taken into the New Forest. The name "Ivez" or "Ives" was an alternate name for Minstead in the 12th and early 13th centuries. The manor was closely associated with the manors of Bisterne and Totton. In 1186–7 tallage was due to the king from "Ivez, Budesthorn (Bisterne) and Todinton (Totton)" which had belonged to Hugh de Ivez and Robert son of Ulf. In 1248–9 Andrew de Ivez or Minstead (as he is alternately called) was said to hold jointly with John de Bettesthorne, then a minor, half a hide in Testwood, Eling and Bisterne by serjeanty. In 1255–6 John de Bettesthorne and William de Ivez were said to be holding their land conjointly by the above serjeanty, while in 1279–80 they were given as John de Bettesthorne and William de Minstead. After this time the name of "Ivez" disappears, but the Minsteads and the Bettesthornes continued to hold land side by side in Minstead and Totton.

In the 15th century these lands passed by inheritance to the Berkeley family of Bisterne. In 1460 Maurice Berkeley of Bisterne died in possession of the whole manor, leaving a son and heir also called Maurice. His son William apparently forfeited his estates because of his involvement in the rebellion of the Duke of Buckingham against Richard III, but by 1494 the estate must have been back in the hands of the family because William's wife Katherine died in possession of the manor. Her daughter Werburg, aged six years, inherited the estate, and later married Sir William Compton of Compton Wynyates (in Warwickshire), Groom of the Bedchamber and favourite courtier of Henry VIII.

From that time onwards, Minstead remained in the Compton family. In 1670 Richard Compton appeared before the court held at Lyndhurst, to assert formally his claim to the manor. The record of this court shows the special privileges attached to the manor of Minstead. He claimed for himself and the tenants of the manor common of pasture and common of mast "without paying anything therefor," free ingress and egress in the waste lands of the forest, to search for all his animals there straying, the right to hold view of frankpledge twice a year, the right to estrays found in the manor and honey found in the woods; also to have all his woods in the custody of his own woodward appointed at the court baron of the manor and his manor free of forest officials. He also claimed the right to the left shoulder of all deer found within the woods of the manor. Finally on the day of the holding of the view of frankpledge he claimed for himself and his steward the right to kill and carry away one deer.

Henry Compton was High Sheriff of Hampshire in 1758 and was a noted racing man, being an original member of the Jockey Club founded in 1753. His son John, who inherited his father's properties, was Sheriff of Hampshire in 1797. His son Henry became Sheriff of Hampshire in 1819 and took a prominent part in suppressing the 1830 Swing riots at Fordingbridge. His son Henry who succeeded him was Sheriff in 1871, and on his death in 1877 his son Henry Francis Compton became lord of "the manor of Minstead and Brook."

Minstead manor house, which was a brick building in a park of 400 acres, was a pre-18th century building enlarged at the end of the 18th century, but it was demolished in 1950. Minstead Lodge was built in about 1830 by Lieutenant Colonel Edward Pery Buckley and is today used to provide training in hospitality and catering for people with learning disabilities. It also hosts weddings, conferences and events. On the 26 March 1936 a Commercial Air Hire, De Havilland Dragon (G-ACAP) crashed near the town following engine failure, killing all five on board. The aircraft had flown from Croydon Airport and was carrying out military co-operation work around Southampton. Commercial Air Hire had a contract to fly at night to give searchlight crews practice at locating aircraft.

== Demographics ==
At the 2021 census, Minstead had a population of 687 in 285 households.

Census population of Minstead parish
Census	Population	Female	Male	Households	Source
2001	637	310	327	258	
2011	685	343	342	291	
2021	687	325	362	285	

== All Saints' church ==
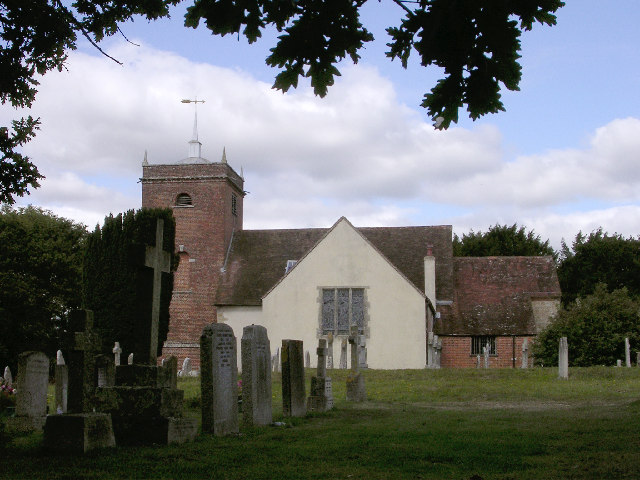
All Saints’ Minstead

The village church is the church of All Saints. The chancel and nave, which are of stone, date from the 13th century. The rest of the building, in red brick, is of 18th-century or later date, including the tower. The font is 12th century.

Sir Arthur Conan Doyle is buried in the churchyard as is his daughter Jean Conan Doyle.

The church has two large galleries and a three-decker pulpit. The church also boasts an unusual "luxury" pew, complete with its own fireplace. The church’s font dates from short before 1100. Prior to being moved to its current location it spent some time in the vicarage garden.

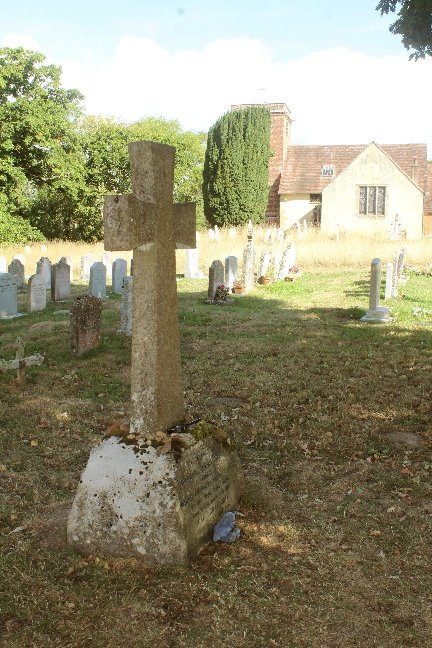
Doyle Grave 2025

The grave of the novelist Sir Arthur Conan Doyle, best known for Sherlock Holmes, is under a tree on the South side of the churchyard. Minstead figured prominently in Conan Doyle's historical novel The White Company. The main character Alleyne Edricson is the second son of the late Franklin of Minstead and brother of the Simon, Socman of Minstead.

Sir Arthur was originally buried in a vertical position in Crowborough in East Sussex. He was re-interred in Minstead by the family of his deceased first wife after the death of the second Lady Conan Doyle. This was possible because the family owned land in the Minstead area.

== The Trusty Servant ==
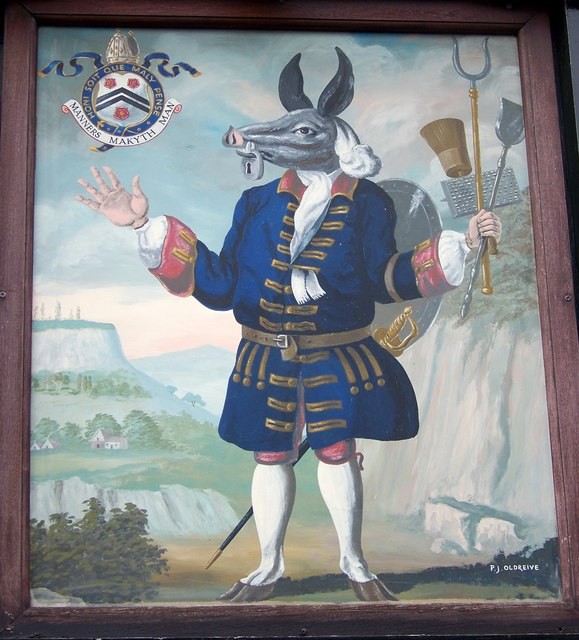
Pub sign on the Trusty Servant inn

The village pub is called 'The Trusty Servant' and has an unusual sign of a man with a donkeys ears, a pig's snout and a stag's feet. The snout has padlocked lips to signify discretion. This implies some past link with Winchester College, where a similar wall-painting of this legendary creature hangs outside the kitchen of the college.

== Minstead Hall ==
Minstead Hall was originally called the Hut and comprised two munition huts left over from the First World War and originally sited in Romsey. The Hall was given to the village of Minstead in 1920 by David Hanbury. However, when he died in 1948 his will did not state that fact. The village therefore had to purchase it from his estate. Lady Congleton loaned the village the money and after much fund raising the loan was finally repaid in 1963. The Social Club, which uses a separate part of the building, was formed in that period. The Hall is run by a Management Committee and is a registered charity (No. 301892). An AGM is held in May every year.

The Hall is the largest of its kind in the New Forest and is used for auctions, dances, theatrical productions, an annual Flower Show, a bridge club, pre-school play group and many other events organised both from inside and outside the village. One of the main users of the hall is Junior Minstead, a children's club. Each year they put on a pantomime which is locally famous. Those who take part share their memories on a wiki.
