= Fritham =

Village in Hampshire, England

Coordinates: 50.925558°N 1.6611920°W

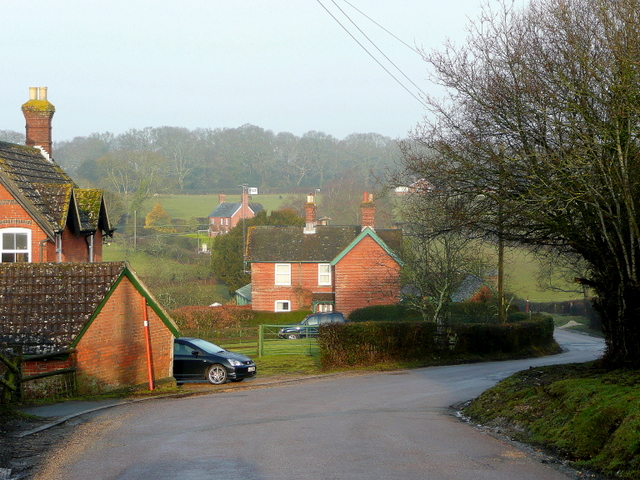
- Fritham

- Location within Hampshire
- OS grid reference: SU239141
- District: New Forest
- Shire county: Hampshire
- Region: South East
- Country: England
- Sovereign state: United Kingdom
- Post town: LYNDHURST
- Postcode district: SO43
- Dialling code: 023
- Police: Hampshire and Isle of Wight
- Fire: Hampshire and Isle of Wight
- Ambulance: South Central
- UK Parliament: New Forest East

Fritham is a small village in Hampshire, England. It lies in the north of the New Forest, near the Wiltshire border. It is in the civil parish of Bramshaw.

== History ==
The name Fritham may be derived from Old English meaning a cultivated plot (hamm) in scrub on the edge of a forest (fyrhth).

The oldest feature in Fritham is a Bronze Age Bowl barrow, known as The Butt, which lies just east of the village, although it has been partially damaged on top by a brick structure.

Fritham is not mentioned in the Domesday Book of 1086. It was once thought that the Domesday settlement of Truham (or Trucham) may have been Fritham, but this is now thought unlikely as Truham was within Boldre Hundred. The first mention of Fritham appears early in the 13th century, when Geoffrey de Baddesley held land in Baddesley and Fritham. Fritham remained attached to the manor of South Baddesley in the parish of Boldre at least until 1429.

The Royal Oak - a thatched cottage with red-brick additions - is one of the oldest pubs in the New Forest, dating back to the 17th century. Fritham Lodge, dating from 1671, may have been one of Charles II hunting lodges. A school and chapel opened in Fritham in 1861.

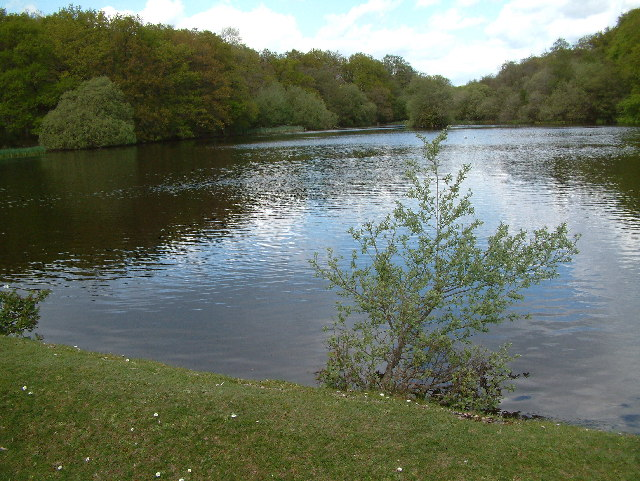
Eyeworth Pond.

From the 1860s until the 1920s Fritham was home to the Schultze gunpowder factory. The factory specialised in smokeless powder for sporting guns. Established in 1865, it was at one time the largest nitro-compound gunpowder factory in the world, with sixty separate buildings and a staff of one hundred. It supplied three-quarters of the world's annual consumption of gunpowder for sporting purposes and often sent 100-ton consignments to the Americas loading road vans and special railway trucks for the docks at Southampton. Little now remains of the factory except for the superintendent's and gatekeeper's houses. Eyeworth Pond, near Fritham, was specially created by the factory as a reservoir to hold water needed during the manufacturing process.

In 1904 the village gained a church in the form of Fritham Free Church.

Four young men from Fritham went down with the Titanic in 1912: Lewis Hickman (aged 32), Leonard Mark Hickman (aged 24), Stanley George Hickman (aged 21), and Ambrose Hood (aged 21).

The Ham class minesweeper HMS Fritham, launched in 1953, was named after the village.
